= Adiantum vestitum =

Adiantum vestitum is a synonym for two species of ferns:

- Adiantum vestitum Spreng., a synonym of Hemionitis lanosa (Michx.) Christenh.
- Adiantum vestitum Wall., a synonym of Adiantum incisum subsp. incisum
