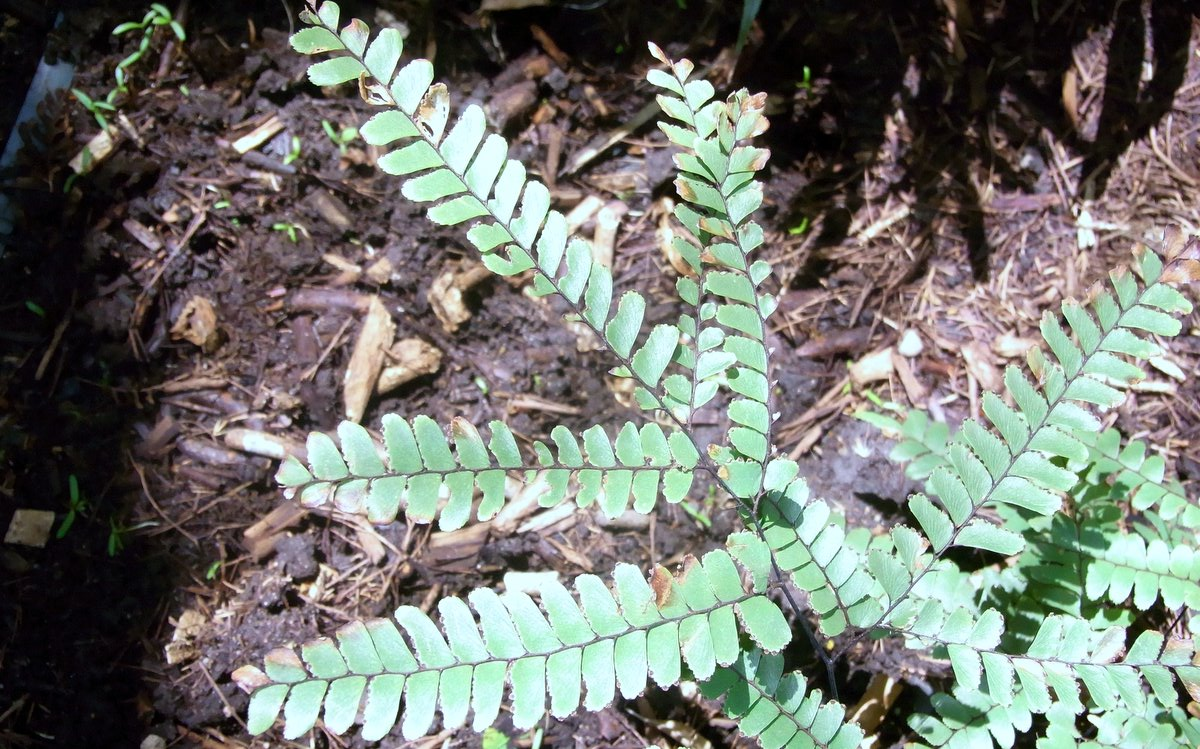
- Royal Botanic Gardens, Sydney, Australia

Scientific classification
- Kingdom: Plantae
- Clade: Tracheophytes
- Division: Polypodiophyta
- Class: Polypodiopsida
- Order: Polypodiales
- Family: Pteridaceae
- Genus: Adiantum
- Species: A. silvaticum

Binomial name
- Adiantum silvaticum Tindale

= Adiantum silvaticum =

Species of fern

Adiantum silvaticum, is a small maidenhair fern found in eastern Australia. The habitat is open eucalyptus forest or rainforest. It may be seen on moist cliff faces and beside streams, often in high rainfall areas. Found as far south as Ulladulla in south-east New South Wales. This species prefers poorer soils. When with the hairless bluish form, it may be confused with Adiantum cunninghamii.
