= Venus' hair =

Venus' hair can refer to:

- In geology, fine crystals of rutile in quartz.
- In horticulture, a name for ferns in the genus Adiantum.
