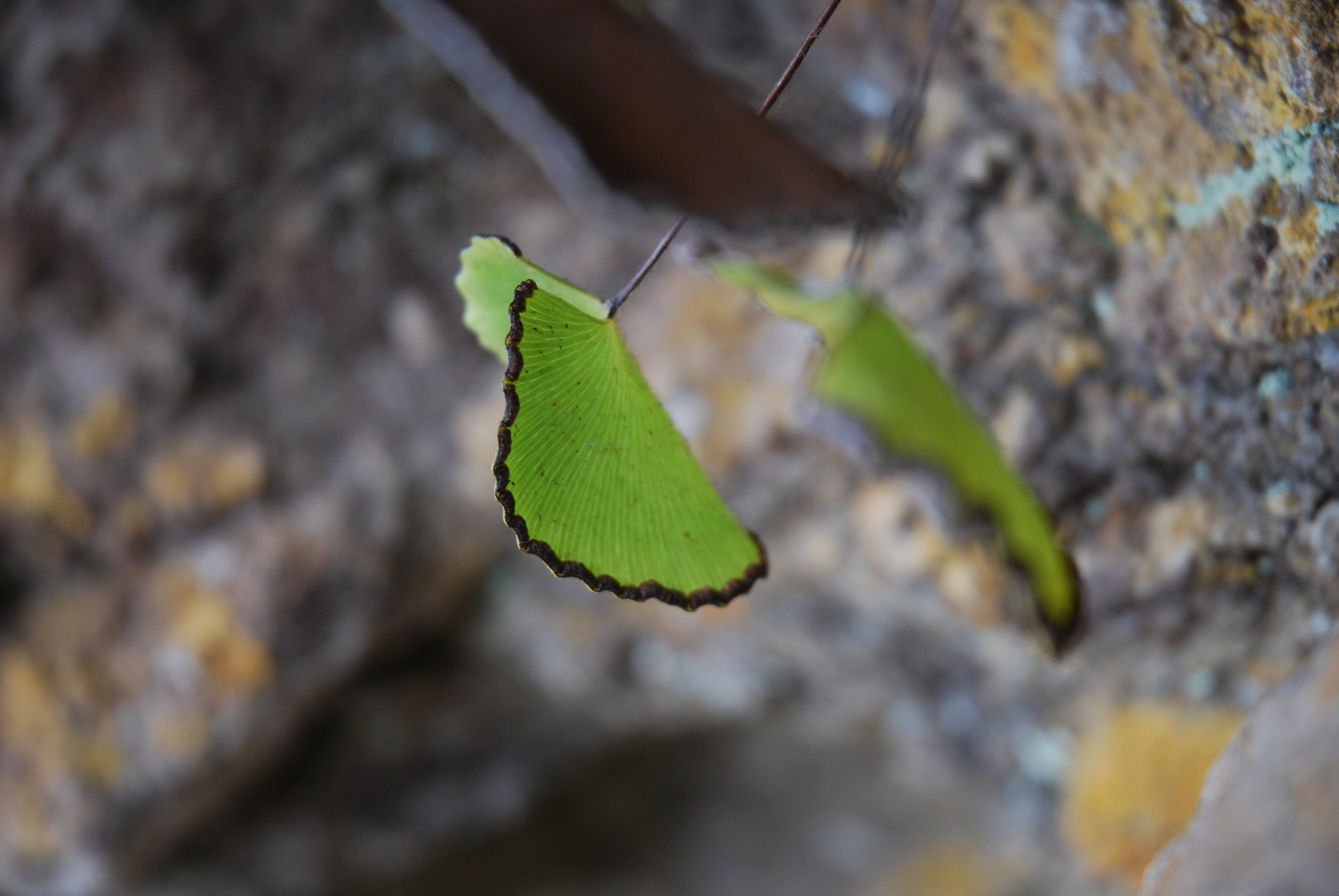
- The underside of the leaf showing the marginal indusium

Scientific classification
- Kingdom: Plantae
- Clade: Embryophytes
- Clade: Tracheophytes
- Division: Polypodiophyta
- Class: Polypodiopsida
- Order: Polypodiales
- Family: Pteridaceae
- Genus: Adiantum
- Species: A. reniforme

Binomial name
- Adiantum reniforme L.

= Adiantum reniforme =

Species of fern

Adiantum reniforme (kidney-leaved maidenhair fern) is a species of fern in the genus Adiantum (maidenhairs), family Pteridaceae. It grows in sheltered rock crevices and on walls. It is native to Madeira (the type locality), Canary Islands and Cape Verde islands, and patchily in East Africa, Madagascar, the Mascarene Islands, Comoros, as well as a few relictual sites in the Tibesti in Chad. The leaves are large, round, dichotomously veined and have a very narrow red edge, marking the presence of the marginal indusium on the underside.

Different circumscriptions with different subspecies and varieties of the species are accepted by different authors.

The Plants of the World Online (POWO) database accepts two subspecies and one variety:

- Adiantum reniforme subsp. reniforme from the Canary Islands and Madeira, and additionally from Cape Verde, Chad, DR Congo, Kenya, Malawi, and Tanzania.
- Adiantum reniforme subsp. pusillum (Bolle) Rivas Mart., from the Canary Islands and Madeira.
- Adiantum reniforme var. asarifolium (Willd.) Sim, from Mauritius and Réunion (POWO does not state which of the two subspecies this variety belongs to).

Conversely, a study by Ai-Hua Wang et al., proposes the acceptance of just two varieties:

- Adiantum reniforme var. reniforme, from the Canary Islands and Madeira Islands.
- Adiantum reniforme var. asarifolium, found in continental Africa and the Indian Ocean islands (Madagascar, Seychelles, Comoros, and Réunion).

A similar taxon of Adiantum that is found only in the Three Gorges area of Wanzhou, Chongqing, China was formerly regarded as a Tertiary relictual variety of this species, and named as Adiantum reniforme var. sinense. This variety has since been elevated to species level as Adiantum nelumboides, the lotus-leaved maidenhair fern. It is threatened with extinction due to habitat destruction caused by the Three Gorges Dam.
