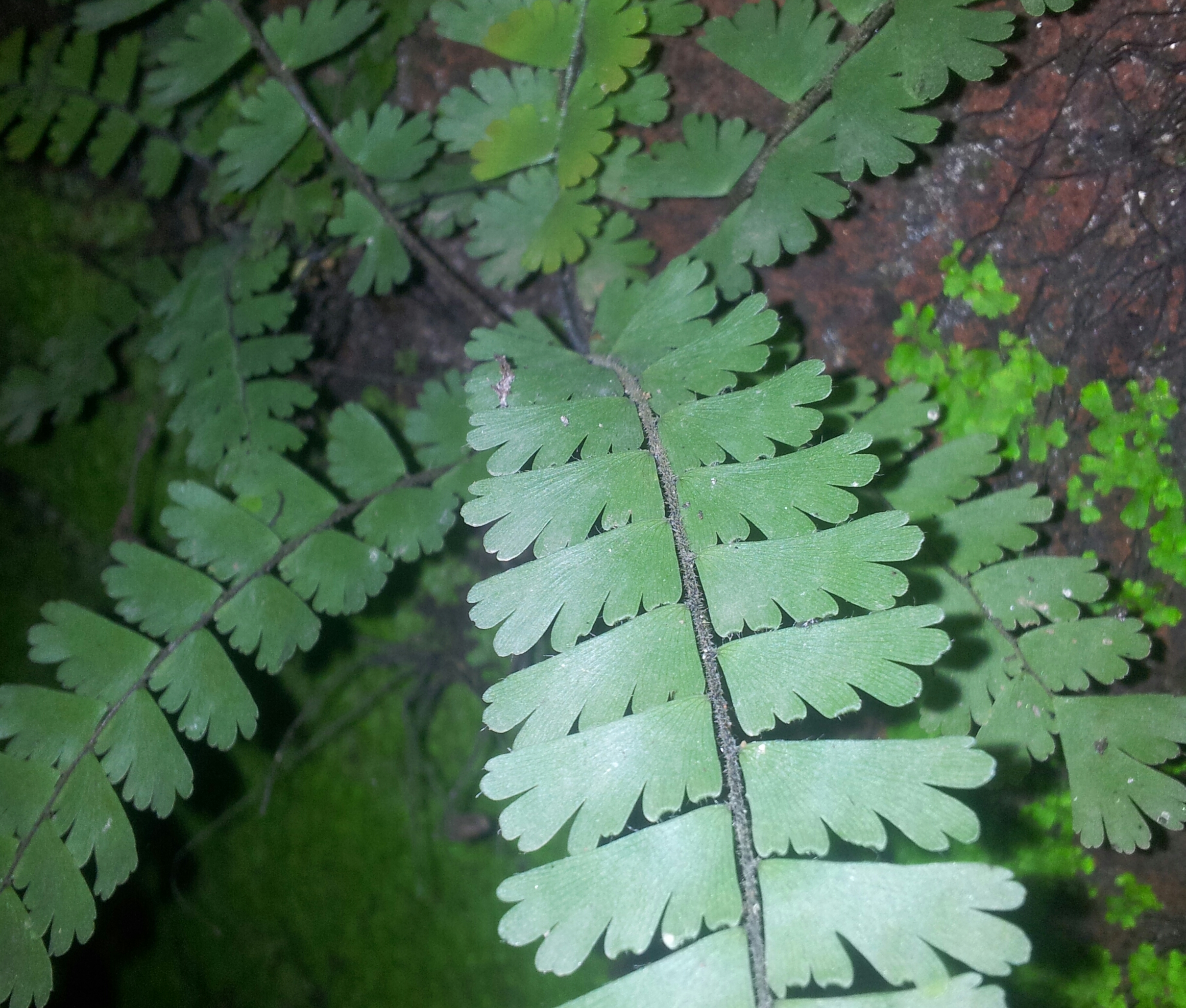

Scientific classification
- Kingdom: Plantae
- Clade: Tracheophytes
- Division: Polypodiophyta
- Class: Polypodiopsida
- Order: Polypodiales
- Family: Pteridaceae
- Genus: Adiantum
- Species: A. caudatum

Binomial name
- Adiantum caudatum Klotzsch

= Adiantum caudatum =

Species of fern

Adiantum caudatum, commonly walking maidenhair, tailed maidenhair, trailing maidenhair is a fern in the genus Adiantum and the family Pteridaceae.

== Distribution ==
Adiantum caudatum can be found in shaded areas in south-east countries Bangladesh, Burma, India, Nepal, Philippines, Thailand, China, Vietnam.

== Cultivation ==
Adiantum caudatum can be grown in moist potting soil. It prefers medium levels of light and does not tolerate cool temperatures. When grown in a hanging container, the dangling fronds can be displayed to good effect.
