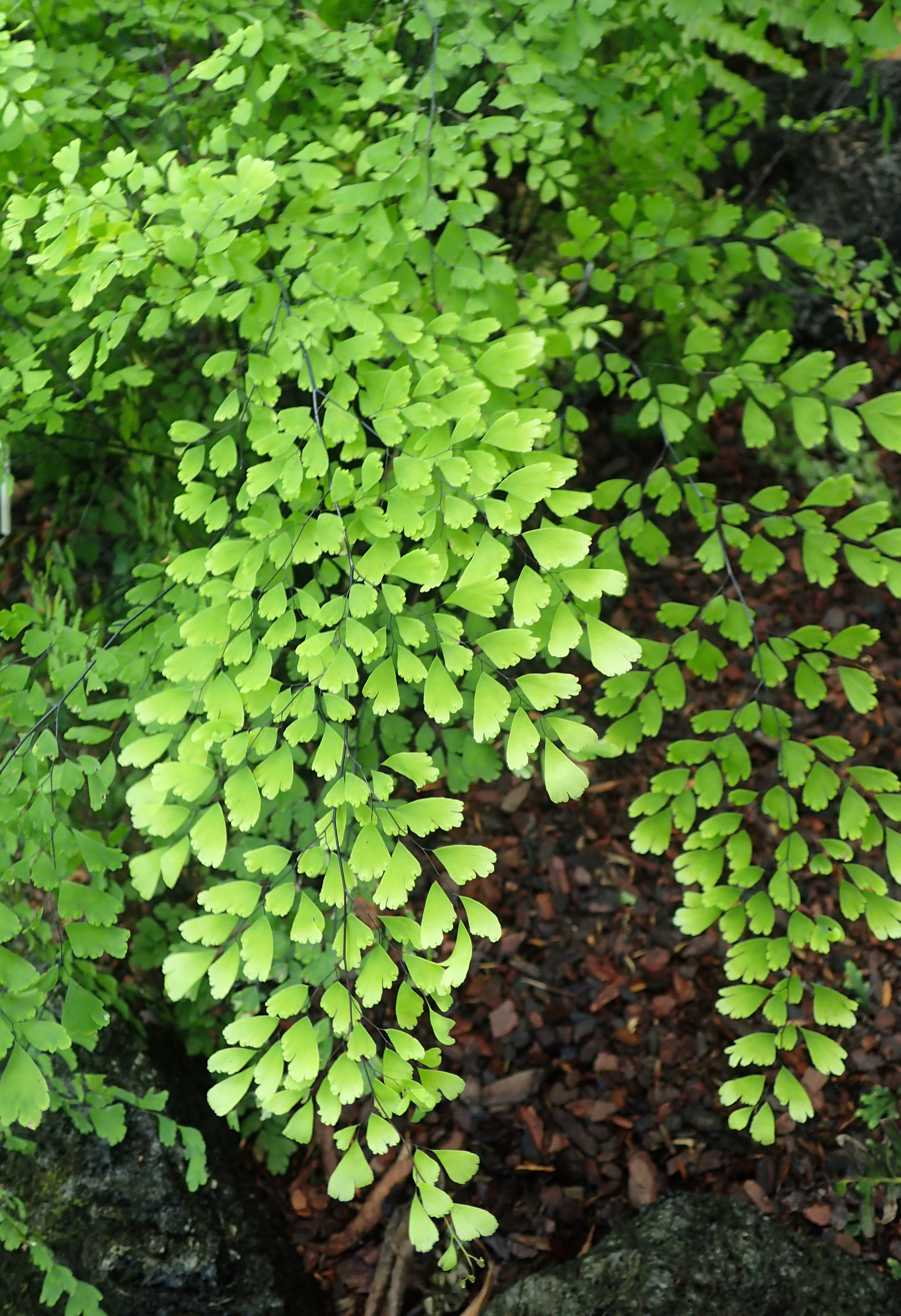

Scientific classification
- Kingdom: Plantae
- Clade: Tracheophytes
- Division: Polypodiophyta
- Class: Polypodiopsida
- Order: Polypodiales
- Family: Pteridaceae
- Genus: Adiantum
- Species: A. chilense

Binomial name
- Adiantum chilense Kaulf.

= Adiantum chilense =

Species of fern

Adiantum chilense is a species of fern in the family Pteridaceae. It is native to South America.
