= Adiantum alarconianum =

Scientific classification
- Kingdom: Plantae
- Clade: Tracheophytes
- Division: Polypodiophyta
- Class: Polypodiopsida
- Order: Polypodiales
- Family: Pteridaceae
- Genus: Adiantum
- Species: A. alarconianum

Binomial name
- Adiantum alarconianum Gaudich.

Synonyms
- Adiantum incisum C.Presl

Species of fern

Adiantum alarconianum is a South American maidenhair fern. First scientifically collected in the early 1800s in Ecuador, it is found in neighboring parts of Peru as well. Its iridescent stem scales help to differentiate it from other related ferns.

== Description ==
The leaves range from 30 to 50 cm in length, and vary from generally linear to egg-shaped, coming to a point at the tip. The leaf blade is cut into pinnae; the lower and basal pinnae are sometimes cut again into pinnules in the specimens wider at the base.

The stalk of the leaf, below the blade (the stipe) may have a few short soft hairs and/or scales on the upper side, or be completely hairless. The stem passing through the leaf blade (the rachis) always has such hairs and/or scales on the upper side, but these do not usually extend to the rest of the rachis. When they occur, the hairs often branch into a star-like shape. The stem scales are iridescent, a distinctive feature of the species.

The pinnae, which are alternate on the rachis, range in shape from oblong-falcate (somewhat sickle-shaped) to long-triangular. They are asymmetrical at the base, being attached directly (without petioles) to the rachis near one corner of the pinna. The upper surfaces of the pinnae are hairless; the false indusia occur along one edge. They are folded over the upper side of the leaf and are not divided.

== Taxonomy ==
Adiantum alarconianum was originally described as A. incisum by Carl Presl in publishing the collection of Thaddäus Haenke in 1825. However, the name A. incisum had already been used in 1775 to describe a fern collected by Peter Forsskål. Presl's ferns were later held to be synonymous with A. alarconianum, the type specimen for which was collected in 1836 and published in 1846 by Charles Gaudichaud.

== Distribution and habitat ==
Adiantum incisum Presl was described as occurring in Guayas Province, near Guayaquil, and in Mexico, but the latter reference is now held to be an error. The type specimen of A. alarconianum was also collected near Guayaquil. It has been collected in a number of locations in western Ecuador and in the Galápagos Islands, and in the nearby Tumbes Province of Peru. Peruvian specimens were collected in woods.

== Bibliography ==
- Hemsley, W. Botting (1886). Godman, F. Ducane; Salvin, Osbert (eds.). Biologia Centrali-Americana. Vol. III. London: R.H. Porter.
- Presl, Carl Borivoj (1825). Reliquuiae Haenkeanae (in Latin). Vol. 1. Prague: J.G. Calve. p. 61.
- "Adiantum alarconianum Gaudich". Tropicos. Missouri Botanical Garden.
- Tryon, Rolla M.; Stolze, Robert G. (1989). "Pteridophyta of Peru–Part II 13. Pteridaceae-15. Dennstaedtiaceae". Fieldiana. Botany. New Series (22): 67. ISSN 0015-0746.
