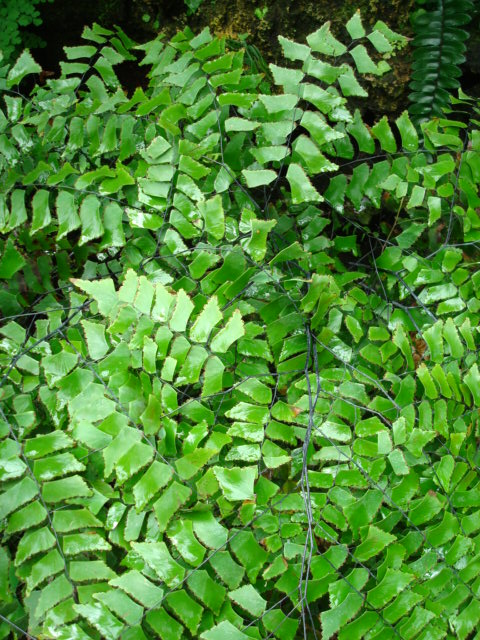

Conservation status
- Vulnerable (NatureServe)

Scientific classification
- Kingdom: Plantae
- Clade: Tracheophytes
- Division: Polypodiophyta
- Class: Polypodiopsida
- Order: Polypodiales
- Family: Pteridaceae
- Genus: Adiantum
- Species: A. trapeziforme

Binomial name
- Adiantum trapeziforme L.

Synonyms
- see text

= Adiantum trapeziforme =

Diamond maidenhair

Species of fern

Adiantum trapeziforme, the giant maidenhair or diamond maidenhair, is a species of fern in the genus Adiantum, native to the tropical rainforests of Central and South America.

== Description ==
Maidenhair ferns, genus Adiantum, grow on the ground and on rocks. Species in the genus are mainly identified by this feature:

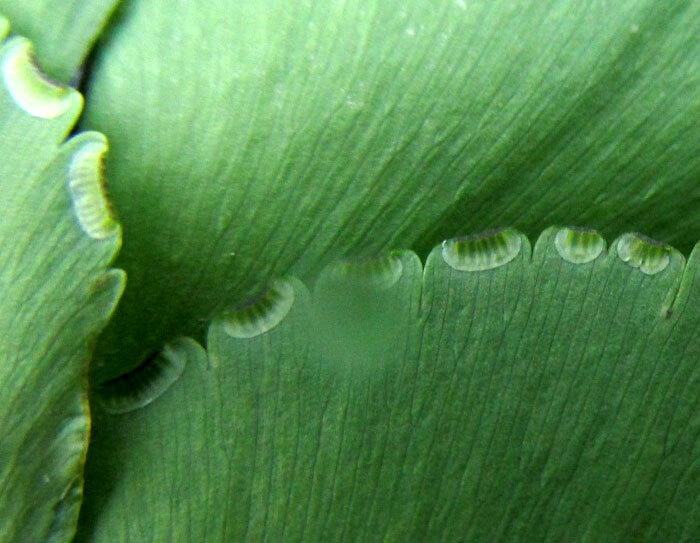
Adiantum trapeziforme false indusia on pinnule undersides

- The spore-producing sporangia are produced along one side of the smallest division of a compound leaf, the "pinnule," in structures consisting of turned-under flaps of the pinnule's margin, known as "false indusia"; the false indusia are separated from one another as shown at the left.

Among the 245 or so accepted Adiantum species, Adiantum trapeziforme is further distinguished by these features:

- Blades are 2-4 times pinnately divided.
- The final segments, the pinnules, are relatively large, up to 5cm long and 2cm across (~2 x 3/4 inches).
- The pinnules usually have a trapeziform shape.
- Blade stipes are dark purple to blackish and lustrous, of nearly half the blade's length and hairless; where the stipe extends into the blade as the rachis, it's dark purple.

== Distribution ==
Adiantum trapeziforme is native to parts of Mexico, Cuba, Jamaica, the Lesser Antilles south through Central America, Trinidad and possibly Venezuela. It is documented, apparently introduced, in India, Sri Lanka and the US state of Florida. Citizen scientists contributing to iNaturalist appear to have observed the species in other locations as well, particularly in Indonesia and Oceania.

== Habitat ==
Adiantum trapeziforme occurs in wet forests and secondary forests, from lower elevations to 1000 meters (~3300 feet).

== Traditional uses ==
Adiantum trapeziforme has been documented used to treat snakebite and to help girls from being bothered when walking along the road. Also, the fronds are used as decorations.

== Taxonomy ==
Within the family Pteridaceae, Adiantum trapeziforme belongs to the subfamily Adiantoideae.

The species Adiantum trapeziforme has been known by these synonyms:

- Adiantum cultratum J.Sm. ex Hook. (1851), nom. illeg.
- Adiantum eminens C.Presl (1836)
- Adiantum formosissimum Klotzsch (1844)
- Adiantum rhomboideum Schkuhr (1809)
- Adiantum schmalzii Rosenst. (1910)
- Adiantum trapeziforme var. cultratum Baker(1867)
- Adiantum trapeziforme var. oblongatum (1857)
- Adiantum trapeziforme var. plumieri T.Moore (1857)

== Etymology ==
The genus name Adiantum derives from the Greek adiantos, meaning "unwetted," in reference to the hairless leaves which shed raindrops.

The species name trapeziforme is assumed to be New Latin construct based on the Latin trapezium, used to name any four-sided form in which no side is parallel to another, and iformis, meaning "-iform", or "formed like."

== Gallery ==
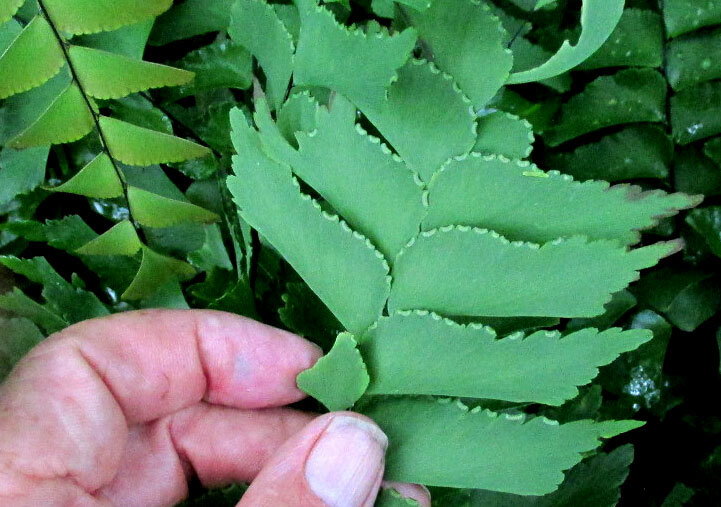
Adiantum trapeziforme pinnule size compared to a hand

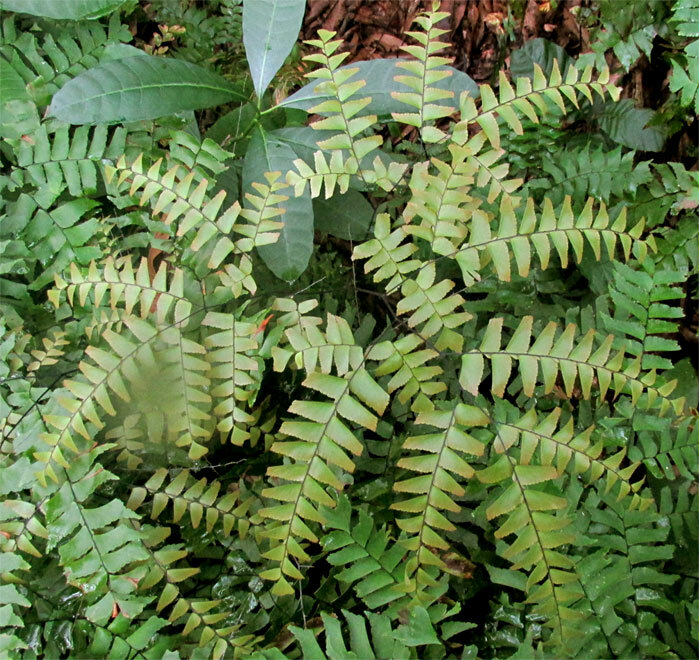
Adiantum trapeziforme compound leaf

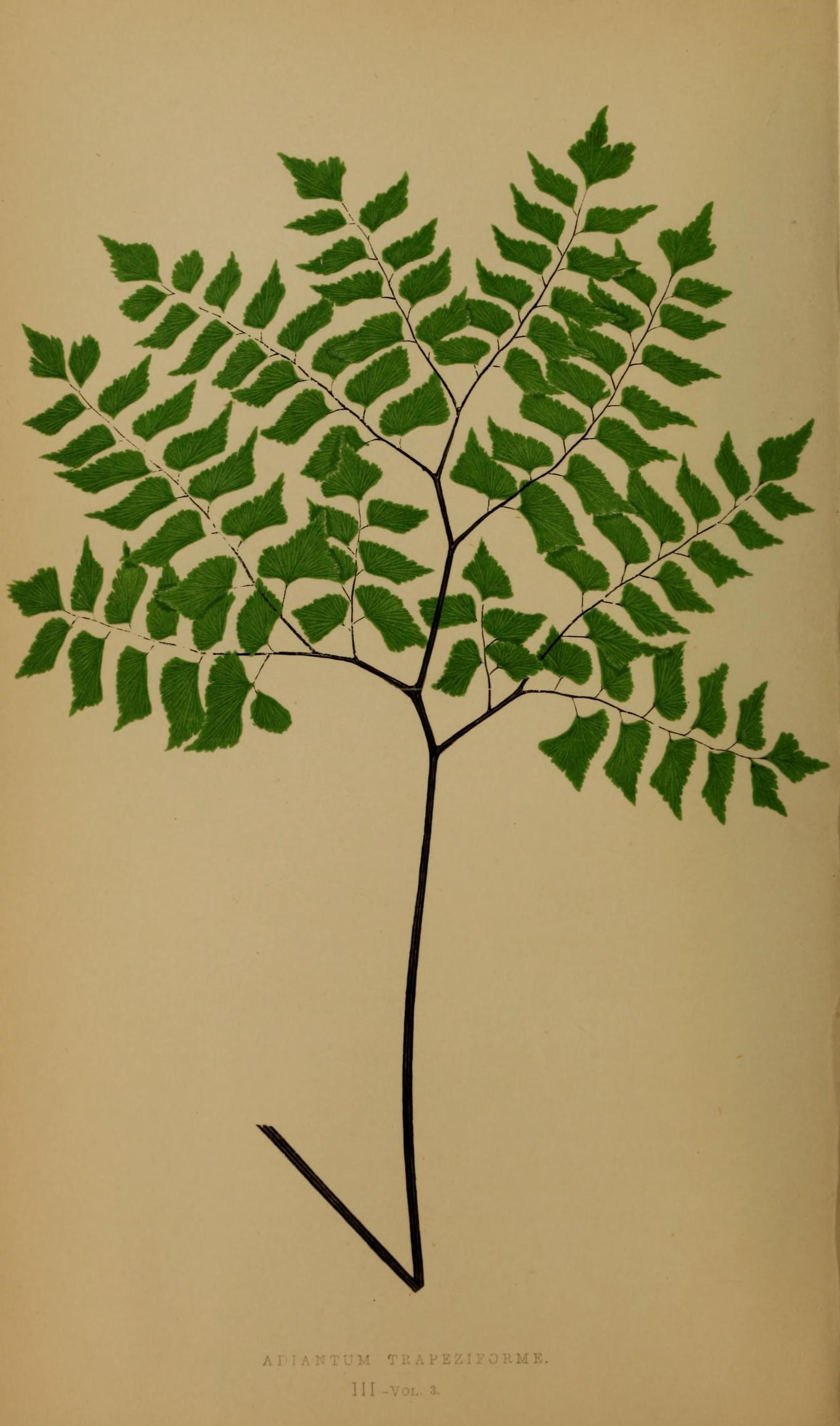
Adiantum trapeziforme
