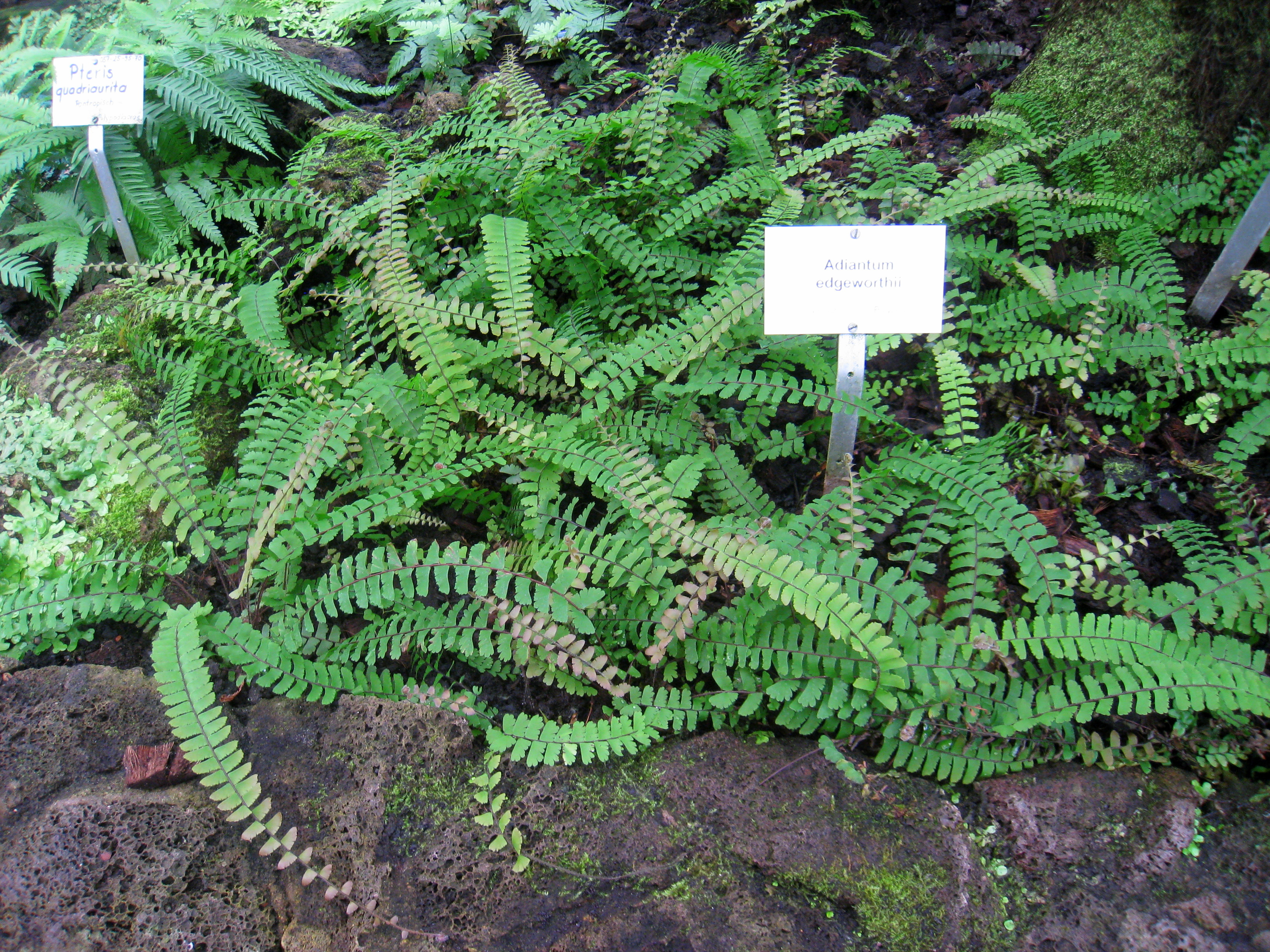

Scientific classification
- Kingdom: Plantae
- Clade: Tracheophytes
- Division: Polypodiophyta
- Class: Polypodiopsida
- Order: Polypodiales
- Family: Pteridaceae
- Genus: Adiantum
- Species: A. edgeworthii

Binomial name
- Adiantum edgeworthii Hook.

= Adiantum edgeworthii =

Species of fern

Adiantum edgeworthii is a species of maidenhair fern.
