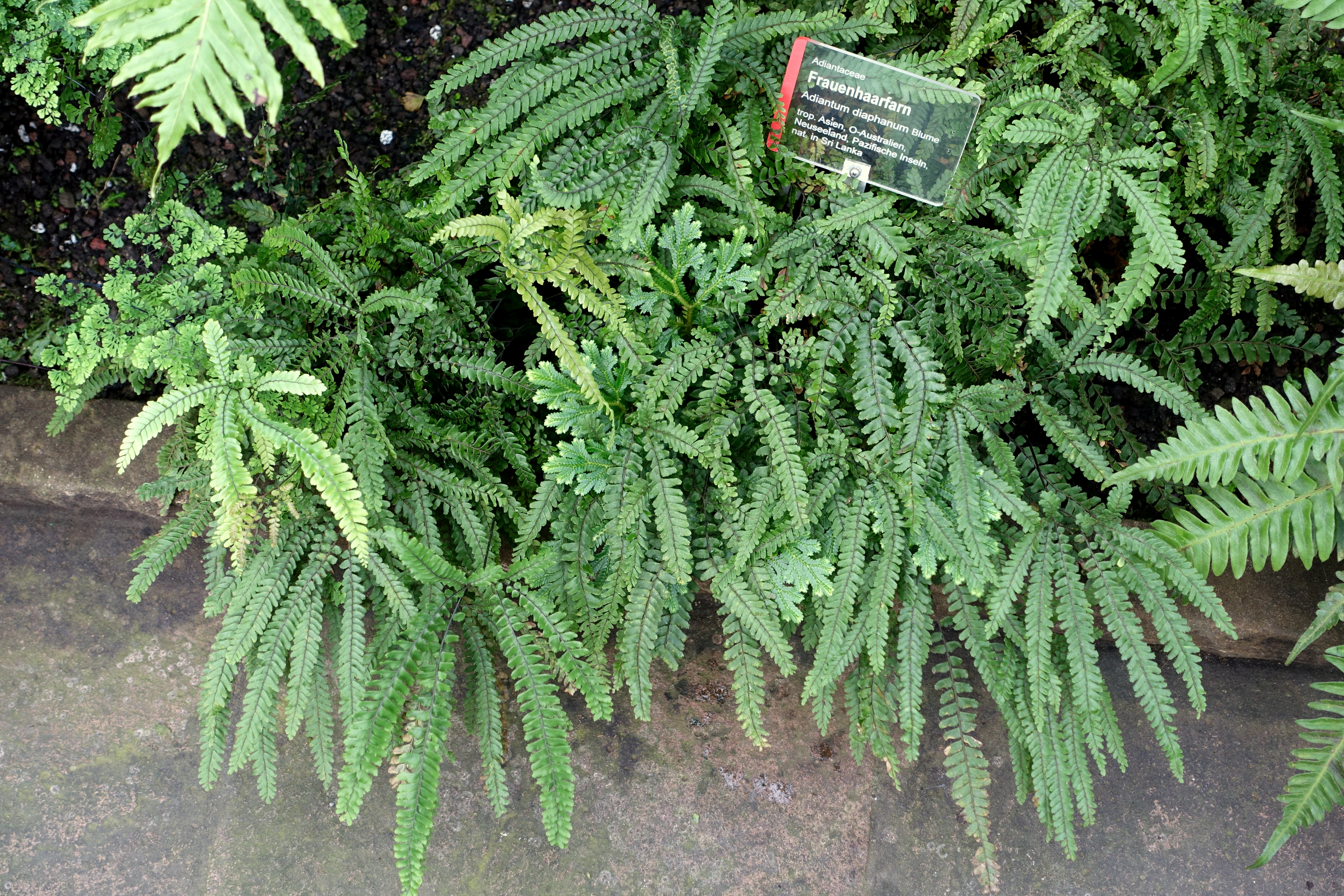

Scientific classification
- Kingdom: Plantae
- Clade: Tracheophytes
- Division: Polypodiophyta
- Class: Polypodiopsida
- Order: Polypodiales
- Family: Pteridaceae
- Genus: Adiantum
- Species: A. diaphanum

Binomial name
- Adiantum diaphanum Blume

= Adiantum diaphanum =

Filmy maidenhair fern

Species of plant

Adiantum diaphanum, the filmy maidenhair fern, is a species of fern in the genus Adiantum, native to East Asia and Australasia, from southern Japan south to New Zealand. It grows to 20 cm long at the most, with very dark green fronds covered with bristles.

== Distribution ==
It is native to China (Fujian, Guangdong, Hainan, Jiangxi), Taiwan, Indonesia, Malaysia, Vietnam, Australia, New Zealand and the Pacific islands.
