= Adiantum amblyopteridium =

Scientific classification
- Kingdom: Plantae
- Clade: Embryophytes
- Clade: Tracheophytes
- Division: Polypodiophyta
- Class: Polypodiopsida
- Order: Polypodiales
- Family: Pteridaceae
- Genus: Adiantum
- Species: A. amblyopteridium

Binomial name
- Adiantum amblyopteridium Mickel & Beitel

Species of fern

Adiantum amblyopteridium is a maidenhair fern of Mexico and Central America. It has twice-divided, arching fronds with dark purple stalks, and grows on shaded banks and lakeshores. It was first described as a distinct species in 1988, based on material from Oaxaca.

== Description ==
Adiantum amblyopteridium is a medium-sized fern, growing in clumps with arching fronds. Fronds are closely spaced along the rhizome, which is up to 5 millimeters (0.2 in) in diameter. It bears brown scales, which are lighter at the edges and have somewhat thicker and darker brown cell walls in the center. They are 2 to 3 millimeters (0.08 to 0.1 in) long and 0.3 to 0.5 millimeters (0.01 to 0.02 in) wide, without teeth or projections at the margins.

The arching fronds are 60 to 100 centimeters (20 to 40 in) long. The stipe (the stalk of the leaf, below the blade) is dark purple, 30 to 60 centimeters (10 to 20 in) long and 2 to 3 millimeters (0.08 to 0.1 in) in diameter. It makes up from one-half to one-third of the total length of the frond. It bears some comb-shaped scales which are largely worn off as the frond grows.

The leaf blades are deltate (triangular) in shape, about 30 to 50 centimeters (10 to 20 in) wide, and bipinnate (cut into pinnae and pinnules). The apex of the blade bears a pinnule similar to those on the remainder of the frond. The rachis (leaf axis) bears tan, lanceolate scales about 1 to 1.5 millimeters (0.039 to 0.059 in) long, with small teeth or cilia projecting from the base. They are not lost over time like those of the stipe. Each frond has 6 to 9 pairs of pinnae, 20 to 35 centimeters (7.9 to 14 in) long and 3 to 4 centimeters (1 to 2 in) broad, and divided into pinnules. The lower pinnules are triangular to fan-shaped, while the pinna apex is merely lobed (rather than divided into pinnules) and elongate. The largest pinnules are 12 to 20 millimeters (0.47 to 0.79 in) by 8 to 10 millimeters (0.31 to 0.39 in), with a blunt and broadly rounded apex. There is no joint at the base of the pinnule where it meets the stalk. The veins are free (not netted) and fork, terminating in tiny teeth at the margin of the leaf blade. Scattered tan, comb-shaped scales about 0.8 mm long are present on the underside of the leaf only. Idioblasts (silica bodies) are visible on both sides of the leaf.

On fertile pinnules, 6 to 10 sori are present. The false indusia formed from the leaf margin are 2 to 3 millimeters (0.08 to 0.1 in) long, oblong to crescent-shaped, and lack hairs or scales. The glabrous (false) indusia, presence of multiple sori per pinnule, and broadly rounded tips distinguish A. amblyopteridium from other bipinnate Mexican species with idioblasts, A. pulverulentum and A. trichochlaenum.

== Taxonomy ==
The species was first described by John T. Mickel and Joe Beitel in 1988, based on material collected by Mickel in Pochutla District, Oaxaca. The type specimen is Mickel 5140, at the New York Botanical Garden herbarium.

A. ambylopteridium and A. obliquum are believed to be the two ancestors of the allopolyploid A. oaxacanum.

== Distribution and habitat ==
It grows on the shaded banks of streams, at altitudes from 50 to 600 meters (160 to 2,000 ft). It is known from Mexico, in the states of Oaxaca, Quintana Roo, and Yucatán, Costa Rica, and Panama.

== Notes and references ==
=== Works cited ===
- Mickel, John T.; Beitel, Joseph M. (1988). Pteridophyte Flora of Oaxaca. Memoirs of the New York Botanical Garden. Vol. 46. Bronx, New York: New York Botanical Garden. ISBN 978-0-89327-323-1.
- Mickel, John T.; Smith, Alan R. (2004). The Pteridophytes of Mexico. Memoirs of the New York Botanical Garden. Vol. 88. Bronx, New York: New York Botanical Garden. ISBN 978-0-89327-488-7.
- Ramírez-Barahona, Santiago; Torres-Miranda, Andrės; Palacios-Ríos, Mónica; Luna-Vega, Isolda (2009). "Historical biogeography of the Yucatan Peninsula, Mexico: a perspective from ferns (Monilophyta) and lycopods (Lycophyta)" (PDF). Biological Journal of the Linnean Society. 98: 775–786. doi:10.1111/j.1095-8312.2009.01331.x.
- Rojas-Alvarado, Alexander F. (2008). "Novelties in the Adiantum tetraphyllum complex (Pteridaceae) from the Neotropics" (PDF). Métodos en Ecología y Sistemática. 3 (Supl. 1): 1–7.
