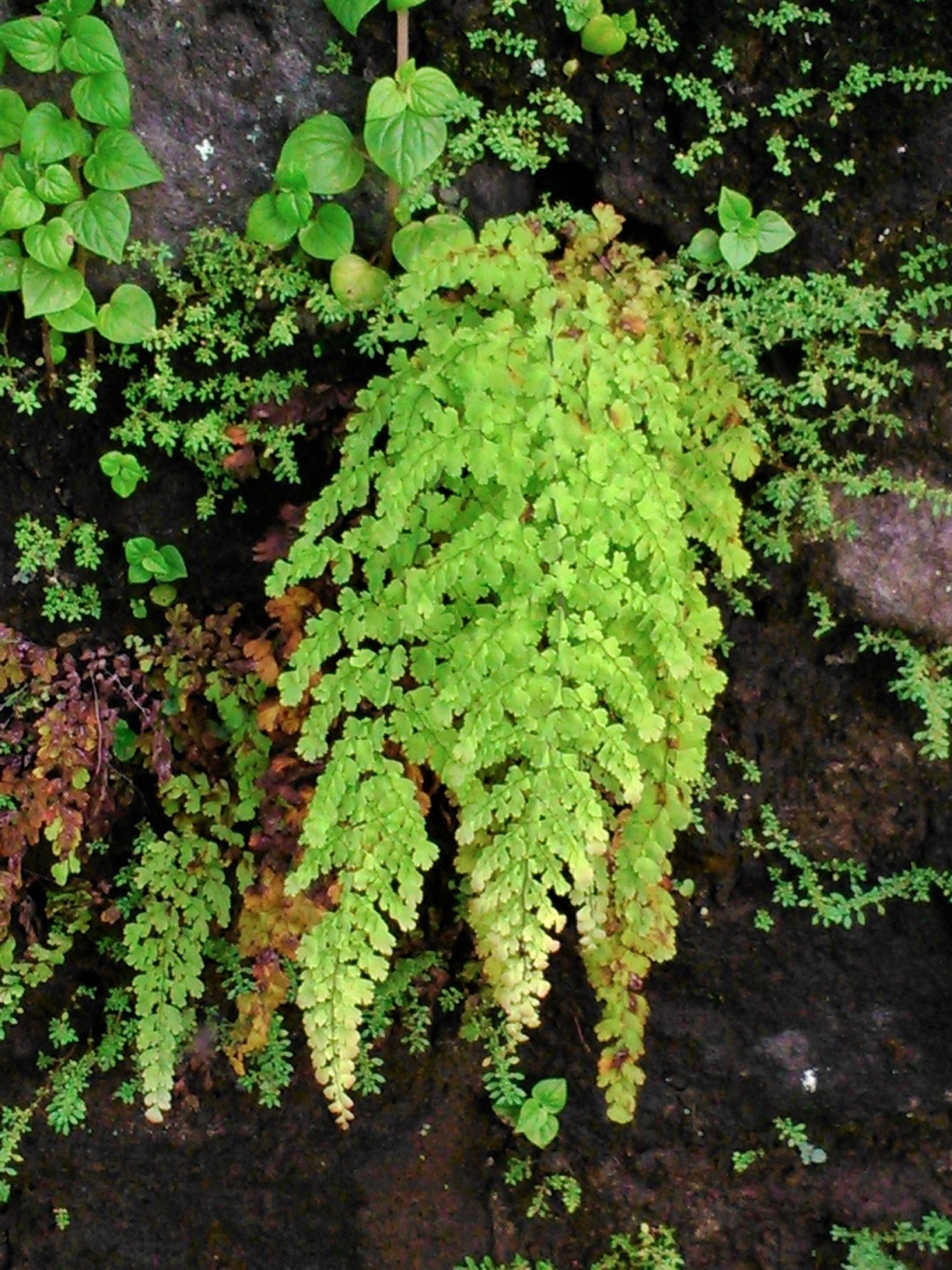

Scientific classification
- Kingdom: Plantae
- Clade: Embryophytes
- Clade: Tracheophytes
- Division: Polypodiophyta
- Class: Polypodiopsida
- Order: Polypodiales
- Family: Pteridaceae
- Genus: Adiantum
- Species: A. concinnum

Binomial name
- Adiantum concinnum Humb. & Bonpl. ex Willd.

= Adiantum concinnum =

Species of plants

Adiantum concinnum, locally known as cilantrillo, culantrillo, or the maidenhair fern is a rhizomatous geophyte used as a local herbal medicine in many South and Central American cultures.

== Description ==
Adiantum concinnum is a rhizomatous geophyte of the genus Adiantum. It can have either an erect or suberect rhizome, its fronds having pinnae that are ovate or oblong-deltoid and 3–4 cm (1.2–1.6 in) by 1.5–2 cm (0.6–0.8 in). Each pinnule possesses up to 10 pairs of pinnae. The fronds of these plants are either pale green or dark green and are fan shaped. The sori are distributed all along the pinnae.

== Habitat ==
Adiantum concinnum is native to a wide geographical area ranging from Northern Mexico to eastern parts of Brazil. It has since been introduced to parts of India, Sri Lanka, Hawaii, and Tanzania. The ferns enjoy a humid tropical biome, and have been observed in altitudes lower than 1,500 m (4,900 ft).

== Cultivation ==
Adiantum concinnum can be grown in moist potting soil. It prefers lower levels of light, and does not tolerate cool temperatures. A cultivar, 'Edwinii', is easier to grow and less sensitive to cold; it may, in fact, be a hybrid with Adiantum raddianum.
