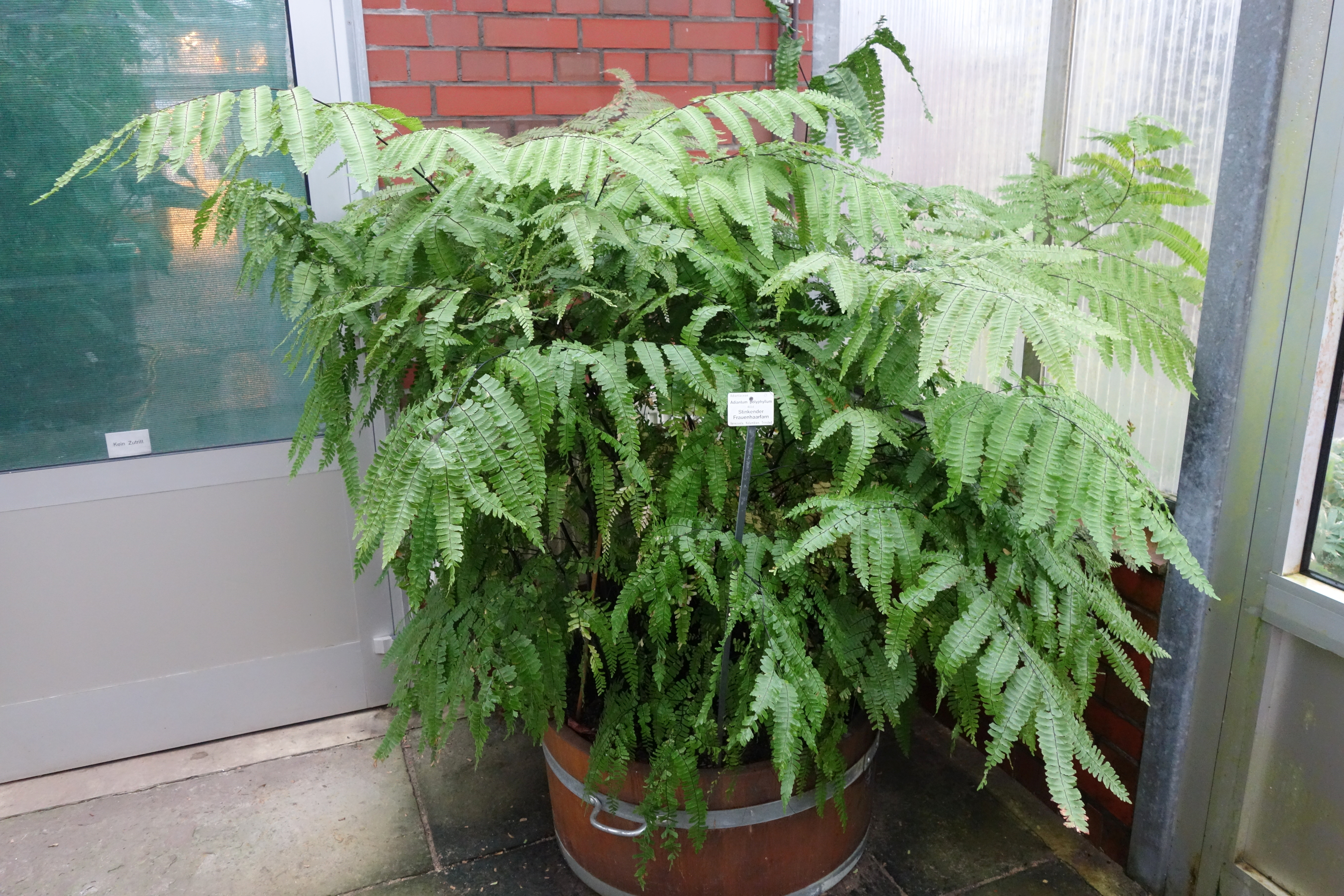

Scientific classification
- Kingdom: Plantae
- Clade: Tracheophytes
- Division: Polypodiophyta
- Class: Polypodiopsida
- Order: Polypodiales
- Family: Pteridaceae
- Genus: Adiantum
- Species: A. polyphyllum

Binomial name
- Adiantum polyphyllum Willd.

= Adiantum polyphyllum =

Species of fern

Adiantum polyphyllum is a fern in the genus Adiantum, endemic to Colombia, Venezuela, and Trinidad and Tobago.
