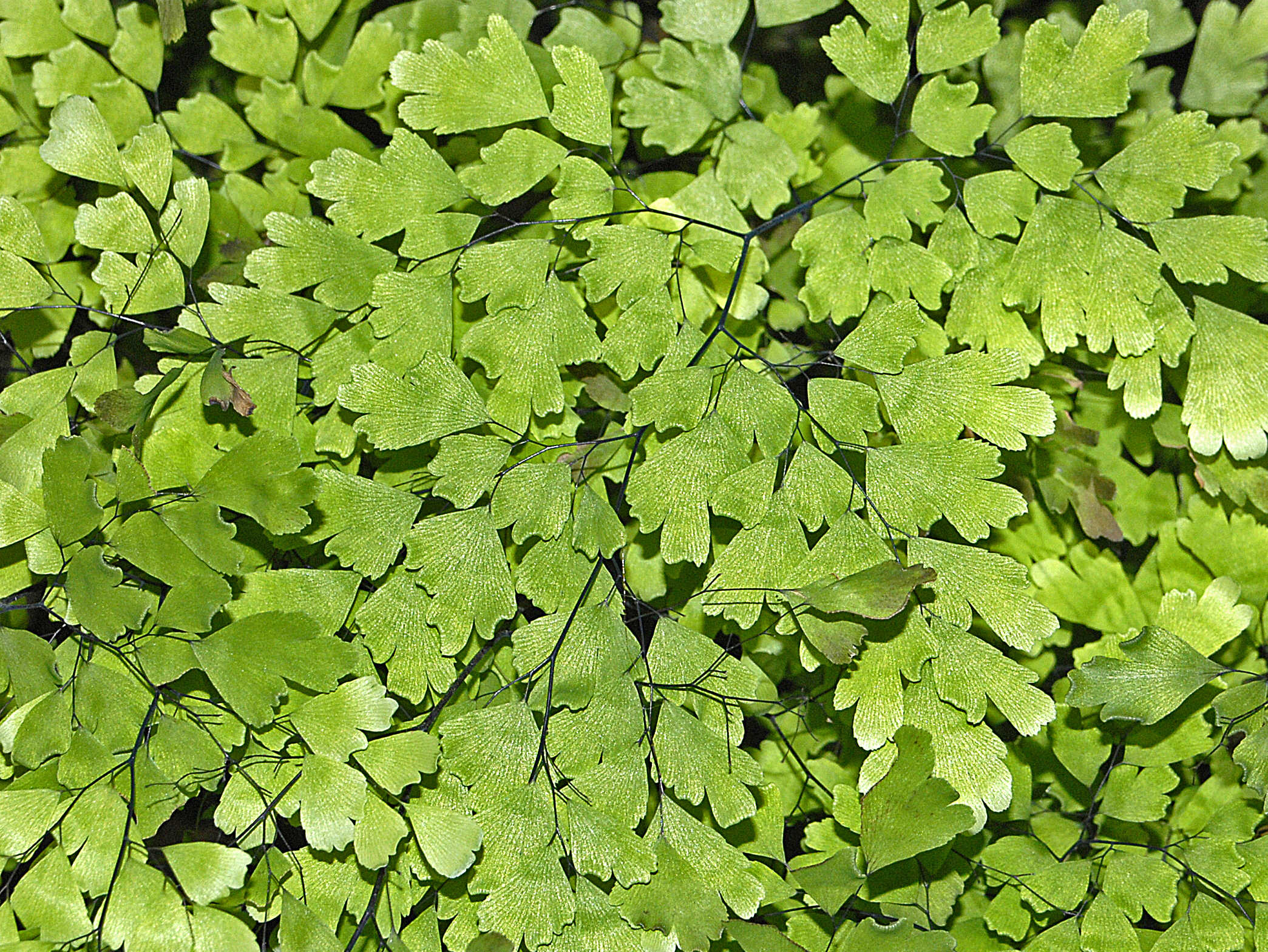
- Adiantum tenerum at the Orto Botanico dell'Università di Genova

Conservation status
- Secure (NatureServe)

Scientific classification
- Kingdom: Plantae
- Clade: Tracheophytes
- Division: Polypodiophyta
- Class: Polypodiopsida
- Order: Polypodiales
- Family: Pteridaceae
- Genus: Adiantum
- Species: A. tenerum

Binomial name
- Adiantum tenerum Sw., 1788

Synonyms
- Adiantum assimile Link; Adiantum extensum Fée; Adiantum ghiesbreghtii hort. ex Backh.; Adiantum glaucophyllum Hook.; Adiantum littorale Jenm.; Adiantum multiforme A. Br.; Adiantum tenerum var. obtusissimum H. Christ; Adiantum trapezoides Fée

= Adiantum tenerum =

Species of plant

Adiantum tenerum, common name brittle maidenhair fern, is a species of maidenhair fern belonging to the family Pteridaceae.

== Distribution ==
This fern species is native to Florida (United States), Mexico, Puerto Rico, Cuba, Jamaica, Bahamas, Costa Rica, Nicaragua, Colombia, Brazil, and Venezuela.

It is restricted to moist, shaded, limestone ledges and grottoes.

== Description ==
Adiantum tenerum grows in a creeping position. Leaves are light green, pinnate, fan-shaped, glabrous, arching or pendent, about as long as broad.
