= Adiantum myriosorum =

Scientific classification
- Kingdom: Plantae
- Clade: Tracheophytes
- Division: Polypodiophyta
- Class: Polypodiopsida
- Order: Polypodiales
- Family: Pteridaceae
- Genus: Adiantum
- Species: A. myriosorum

Binomial name
- Adiantum myriosorum Baker

Species of fern

Adiantum myriosorum is a fern species very similar to Adiantum pedatum. It was once included in that species but now is recognized as being genetically distinct. It is native to Asia, from central China to northern India.
