= Adiantum lianxianense =

Conservation status
- Extinct (IUCN 3.1)

Scientific classification
- Kingdom: Plantae
- Clade: Tracheophytes
- Division: Polypodiophyta
- Class: Polypodiopsida
- Order: Polypodiales
- Family: Pteridaceae
- Genus: Adiantum
- Species: †A. lianxianense

Binomial name
- †Adiantum lianxianense Ching & Y.X.Lin in Y.X.Lin
- Location of Guangdong

Extinct species of fern

Adiantum lianxianense is a species of maidenhair fern native to China. While the IUCN Red List describes it as extinct, due to habitat loss, it may still survive, as it has frequently been confused with other members of the genus.

== Taxonomy ==
The species was first described as distinct by Ren-Chang Ching and You-Xing Lin in 1980. The type specimen was collected by Rev. Benjamin Couch Henry in Lianzhou (Lianxian) in 1881, but was initially determined to be Adiantum gravesii. Ching and Lin distinguished A. lianxianense from that species by its more soft and delicate habit, its slender, hairlike stalks, smaller pinnules obovate or obovate-oblong in shape (rather than broadly ovate or obovate-triangular), and a long stalk 1.5 millimetres (0.059 in) wide.

A 2012 paper purporting to show that A. lianxianense was genetically nested within A. gravesii led the authors to suggest that, due to their genetic and morphological similarity, A. lianxianense should not be treated as a distinct species from A. gravesii. However, this specimen (J.-M. Lu 441, from Guangdong) was subsequently re-identified as A. mariesii.

== Distribution and habitat ==
Its natural habitat is subtropical or tropical moist lowland forest.

== Conservation ==
The IUCN Red List assessment for A. lianxianense in 2004 declared it to be known only from Guangdong and extinct due to habitat loss. However, the species was reported to have been found in Guanxi in 2011, while a 2012 review of narrowly distributed pteridophyte flora in Asia described its range as extending through Guangdong, Guizhou, and Hunan, and did not describe it as extinct.

== Notes and references ==
=== Works cited ===
- Ebihara, Atsushi; Fraser-Jenkins, Christopher Roy; Parris, Barbara S.; Zhang, Xian-Chun; Yang, Yue-Hong; Chiou, Wen-Liang; Chang, Ho-Ming; Lindsay, Stuart; Middleton, David; Kato, Masahiro; Praptosuwiryo, Titien Ngatinem; Amoroso, Victor B.; Barcelona, Julie F.; Ranil, Rajapaksha Haddokara Gedara; Park, Chan-Ho; Murakami, Noriaki; Hoya, Akihiko (2012). "Rare and Threatened Pteridophytes of Asia 1. An Enumeration of Narrowly Distributed Taxa" (PDF). Bulletin of the National Museum of Nature and Science, Series B. 38 (3): 93–119.
- China Plant Specialist Group (2004). "Adiantum lianxianense". IUCN Red List of Threatened Species. 2004 e.T46603A11068836. doi:10.2305/IUCN.UK.2004.RLTS.T46603A11068836.en.
- Jiang, Ri-Hong; Chang, Yan-Fen; Yuan, Hu; Yan, Yue-Hong (2011). "New records for ferns from Guangxi, China". Guihaia (2011–04). Archived from the original on 2018-11-24.
- Lin, You-Xin (1980). "New taxa of Adiantum L. in China". Acta Phytotaxonomica Sinica. 18 (1): 101–105.
- Lu, Jin-Mei; Wen, Jun; Lutz, Sue; Wang, Yi-Ping; Li, De-Zhu (2012). "Phylogenetic relationships of Chinese Adiantum based on five plastid markers". Journal of Plant Research. 125 (2): 237–249. Bibcode:2012JPlR..125..237L. doi:10.1007/s10265-011-0441-y. PMID 21809178. S2CID 7001083.
