= Adiantum fengianum =

Conservation status
- Endangered (IUCN 3.1)

Scientific classification
- Kingdom: Plantae
- Clade: Tracheophytes
- Division: Polypodiophyta
- Class: Polypodiopsida
- Order: Polypodiales
- Family: Pteridaceae
- Genus: Adiantum
- Species: A. fengianum

Binomial name
- Adiantum fengianum Ching

Species of plant

Adiantum fengianum is a species of maidenhair fern endemic to China. Its natural habitat is temperate forests. It is threatened by habitat loss.

The species was first described by Ren-Chang Ching in 1949.
