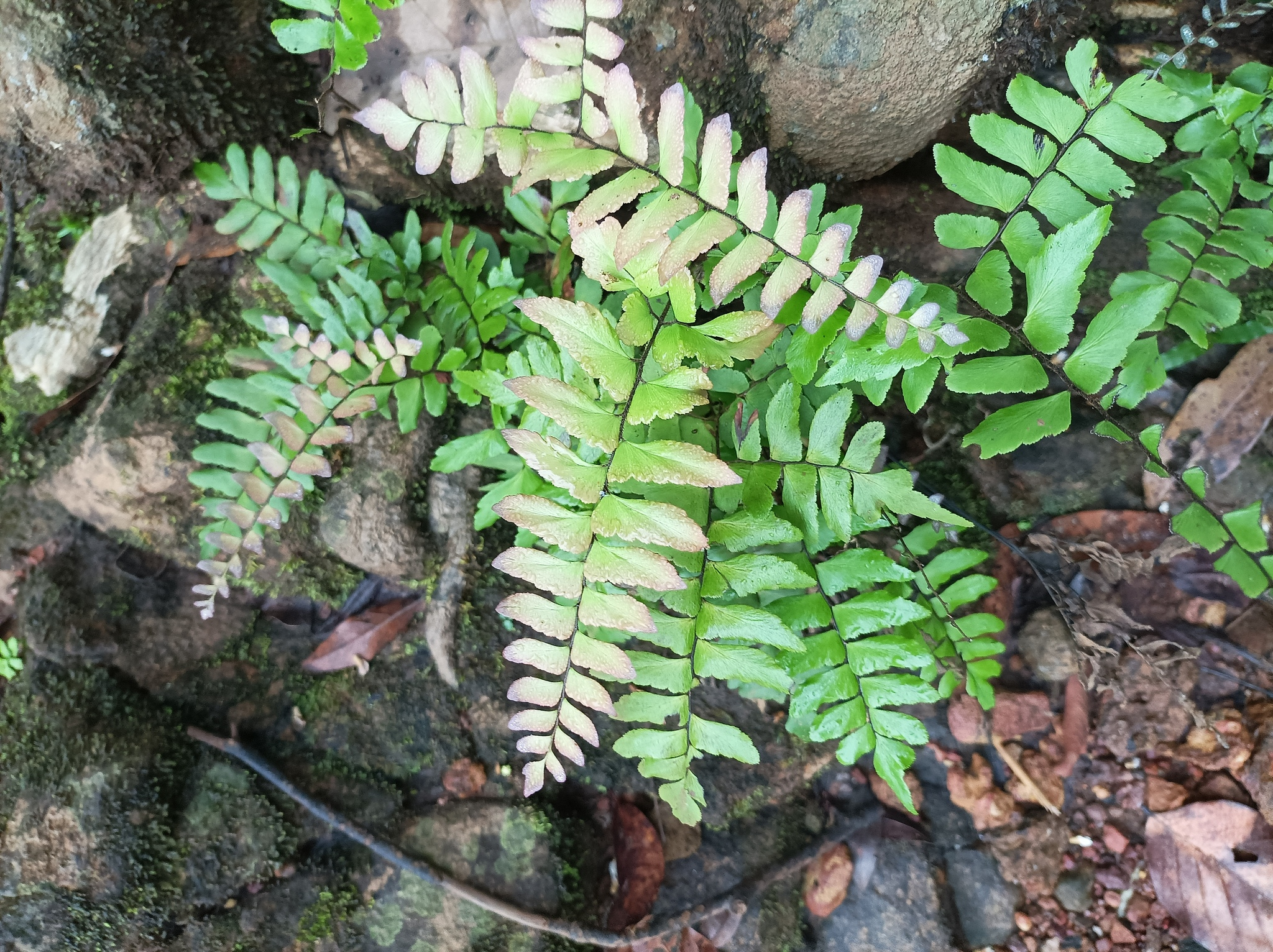

Scientific classification
- Kingdom: Plantae
- Clade: Tracheophytes
- Division: Polypodiophyta
- Class: Polypodiopsida
- Order: Polypodiales
- Family: Pteridaceae
- Genus: Adiantum
- Species: A. latifolium

Binomial name
- Adiantum latifolium Lam.

= Adiantum latifolium =

Species of fern

Adiantum latifolium, the broadleaf maidenhair, is a species of maidenhair fern in the family Pteridaceae. It was first described in 1783 in Encyclopédie méthodique Botanique. The species is native to a wide range from southern Mexico through Central America and much of tropical South America, as well as several Caribbean islands. Its distribution includes Argentina (Northeast), Belize, Bolivia, Brazil, Colombia, Costa Rica, Cuba, Ecuador, El Salvador, French Guiana, Guatemala, Guyana, Honduras, Jamaica, Nicaragua, Panama, Paraguay, Peru, Puerto Rico, Suriname, Trinidad and Tobago, Venezuela, and the Leeward and Windward Islands. The plant has also been introduced into South and Southeast Asia, including the Andaman and Nicobar Islands, India, Bangladesh, Sri Lanka, Thailand, and Malaya. A. latifolium is a rhizomatous geophyte that grows primarily in wet tropical biomes.
