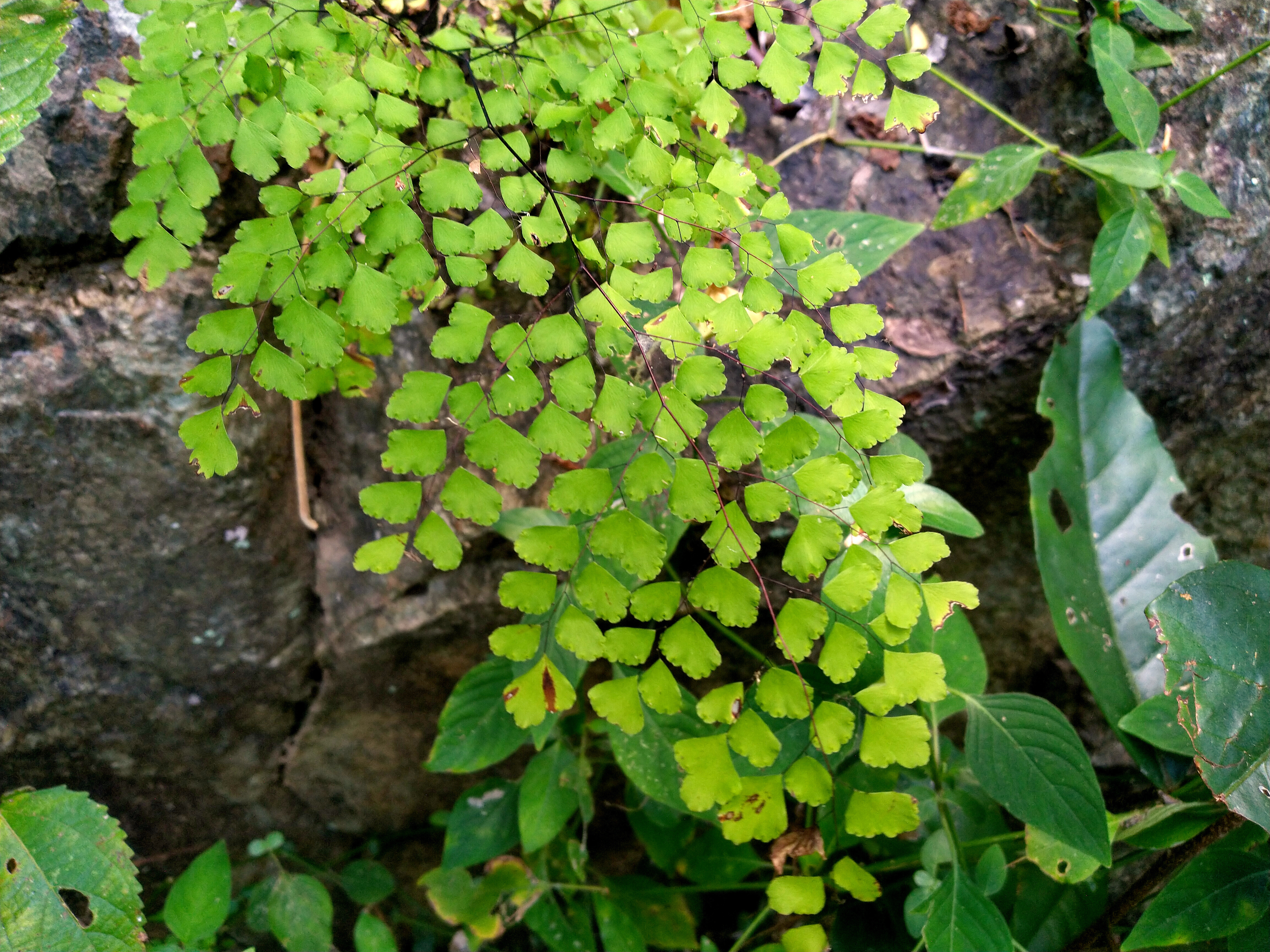

Conservation status
- Special Least Concern (NCA)

Scientific classification
- Kingdom: Plantae
- Clade: Tracheophytes
- Division: Polypodiophyta
- Class: Polypodiopsida
- Order: Polypodiales
- Family: Pteridaceae
- Genus: Adiantum
- Species: A. atroviride

Binomial name
- Adiantum atroviride Bostock

Synonyms
- Adiantum aethiopicum var. nodosa Bonap.; Adiantum aethiopicum f. queenslandiae F.M.Bailey; Adiantum aethiopicum f. variegatum F.M.Bailey

= Adiantum atroviride =

Maidenhair fern

Species of fern

Adiantum atroviride, commonly known as maidenhair fern, is a plant in the family Pteridaceae. It is endemic to Australia and occurs in the Northern Territory, Queensland and New South Wales.

== Description ==
Adiantum atroviride is a small fern with a short creeping or somewhat erect rhizome with dark brown to black triangular scales. The fronds are about 75 cm (30 in) long, loosely clustered, with shiny black stipes and rachises.

The laminae are 2- to 4-pinnate, the ultimate divisions are flabellate (fan shaped), up to 13 mm (0.5 in) long, with shallow lobes on the distal margin. There are between 1 and 7 round to kidney shaped sori on the distal margins, usually at the base of a deep narrow sinus between lobes.

== Taxonomy ==
Adiantum atroviride was first described by the Australian botanist Peter Dundas Bostock, and published in Flora of Australia in 1998. Prior to that it was considered to be a variety of A. aethiopicum.

=== Etymology ===
The genus name Adiantum comes from the Ancient Greek adíantos meaning wet, and is a reference to the way the laminae shed water. The species epithet atroviride is from the Latin ater for black, combined with viridis (green), referring to the black stipes and green foliage of the plant.

== Distribution and habitat ==
This species occurs rarely in Arnhem Land in the Northern Territory, but is common on the east coast of Australia, from the Torres Strait all the way to southeastern New South Wales. It is a terrestrial fern inhabiting dry to medium dry vine forest and sclerophyll forest on a variety of soils.

== Conservation ==
This species is listed by Queensland's Department of Environment and Science as special least concern, a ranking that is unique to Queensland and is placed in between least concern and near threatened.

== Cultivation ==
This is a popularly cultivated fern, valued for its ornamental qualities.

== Gallery ==
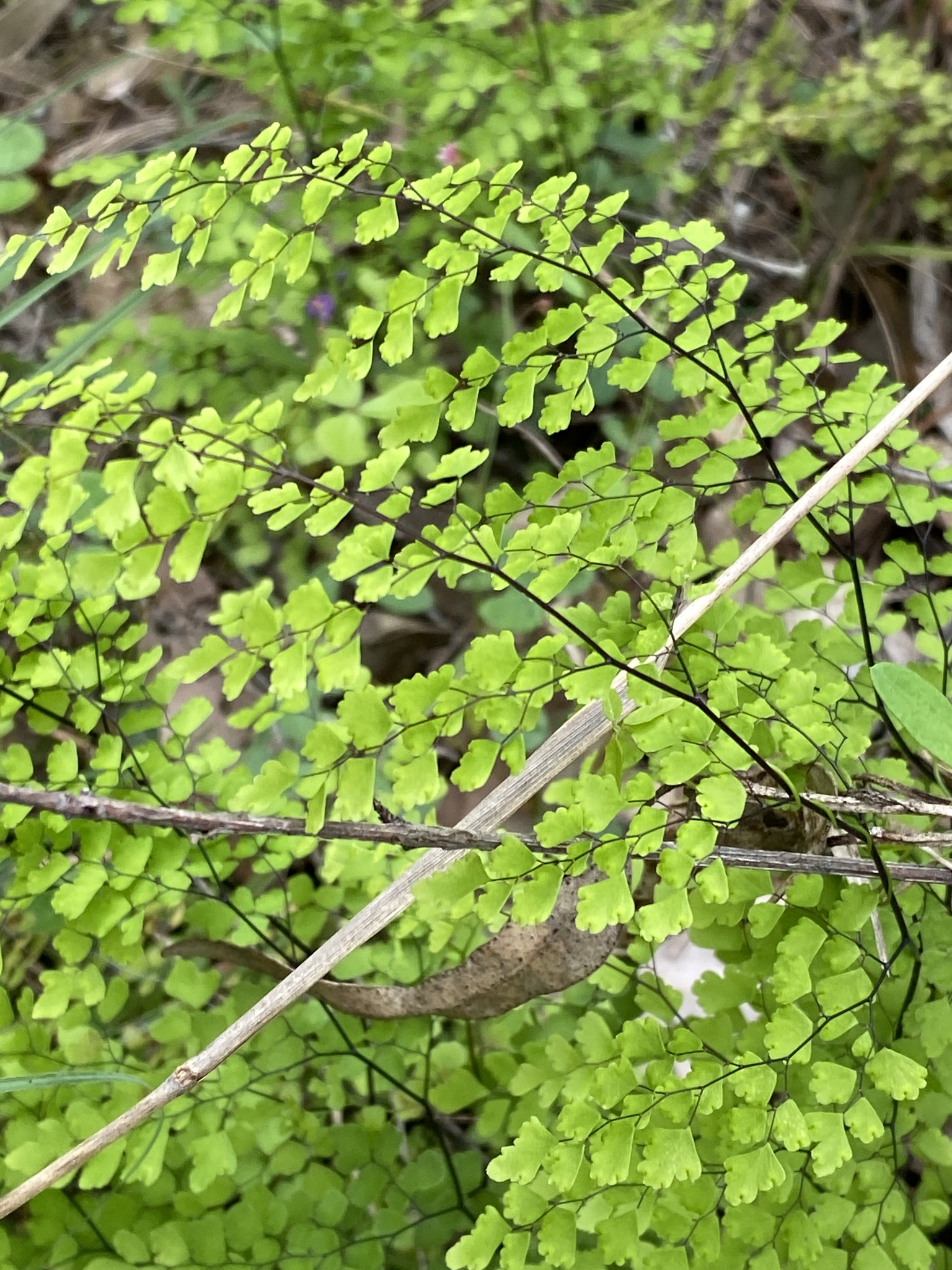
Habit

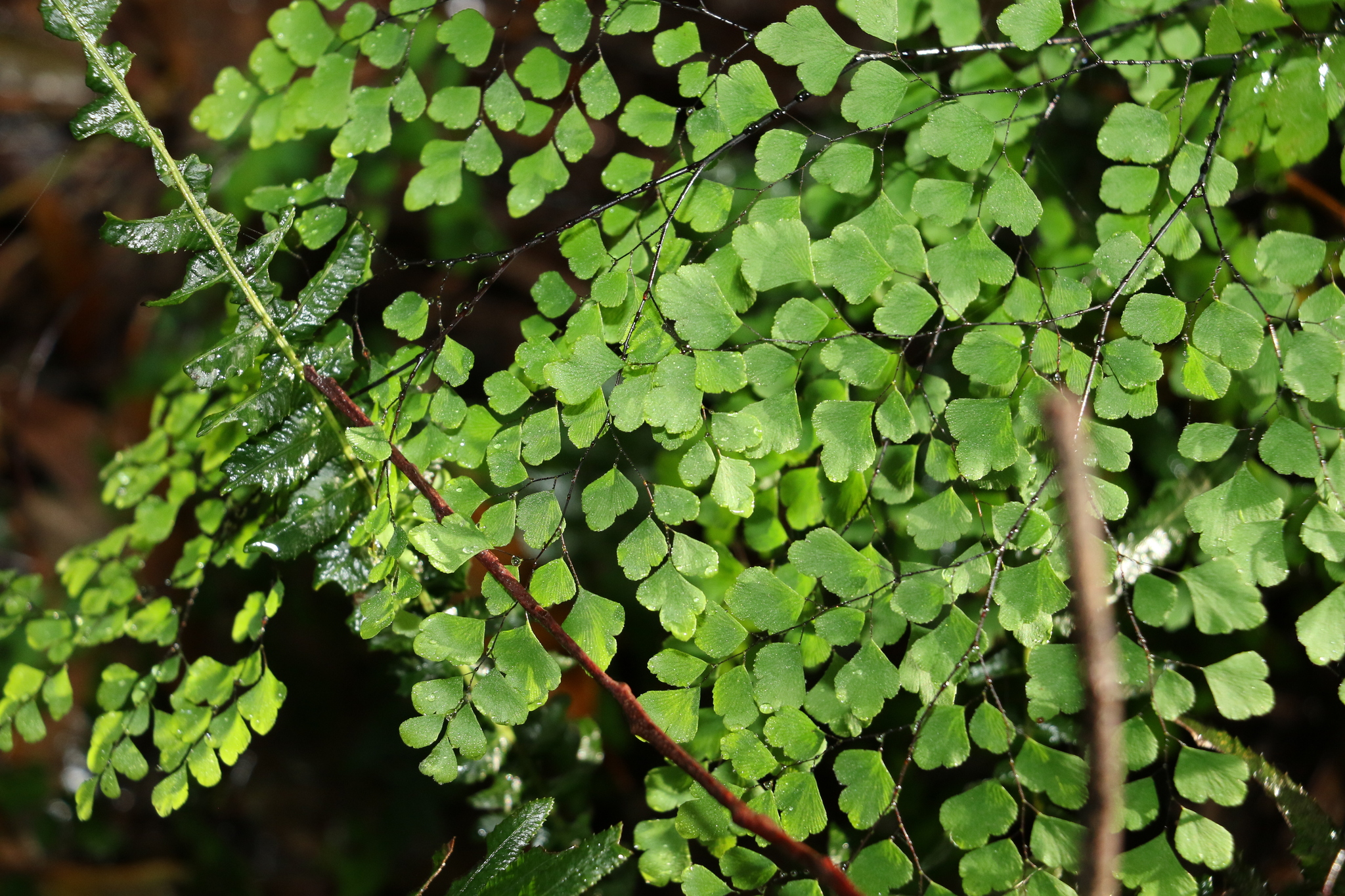

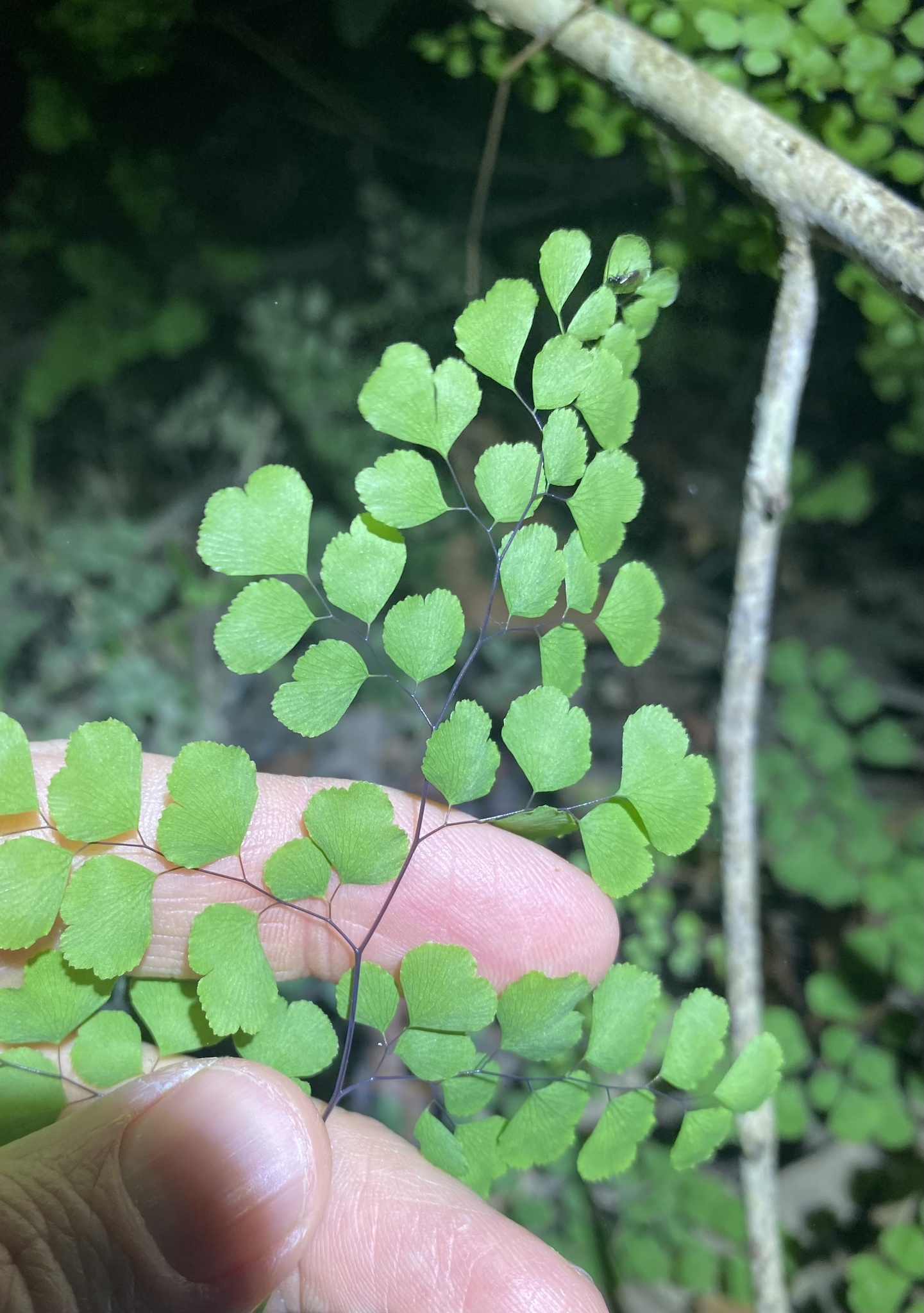

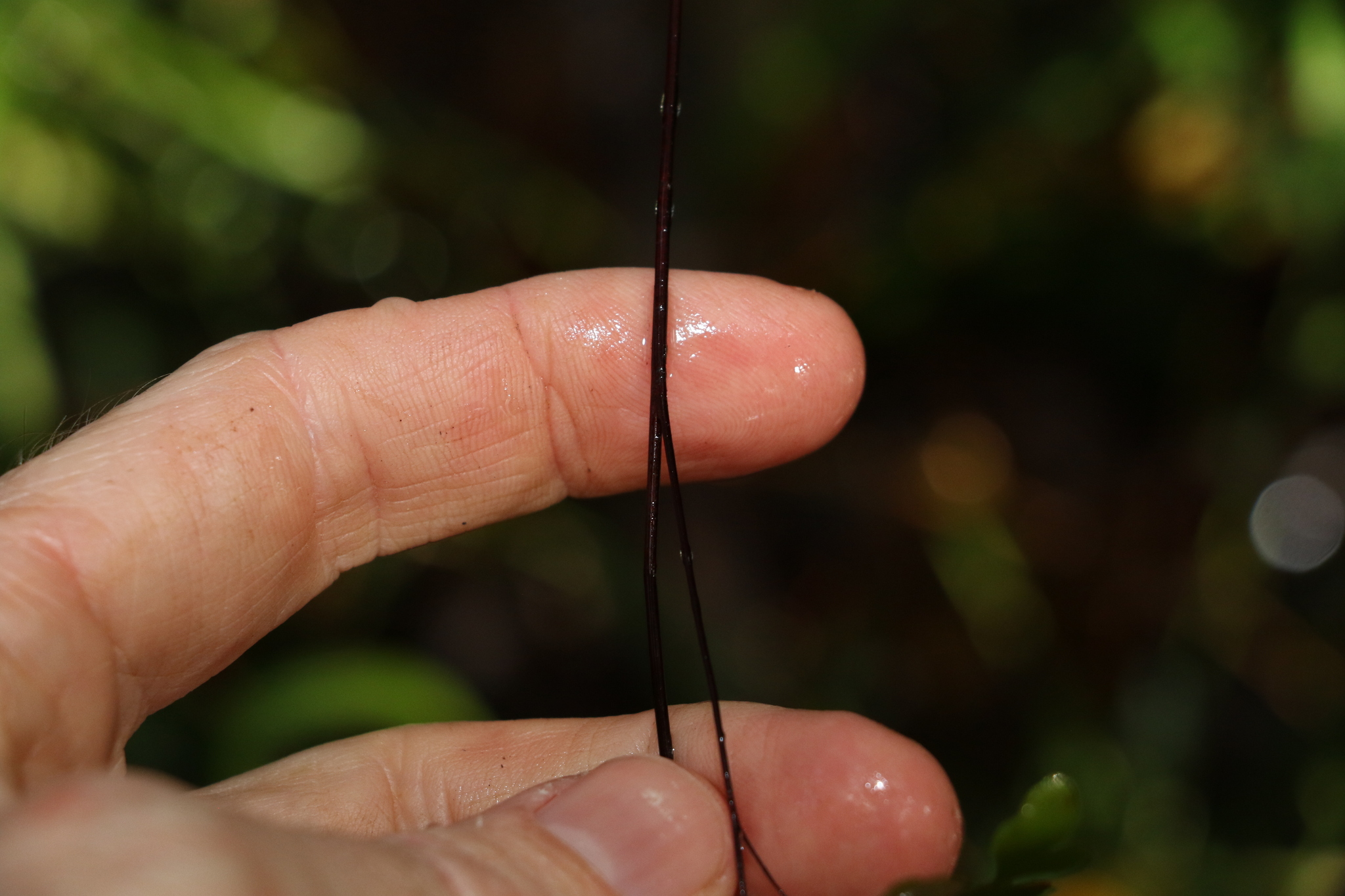

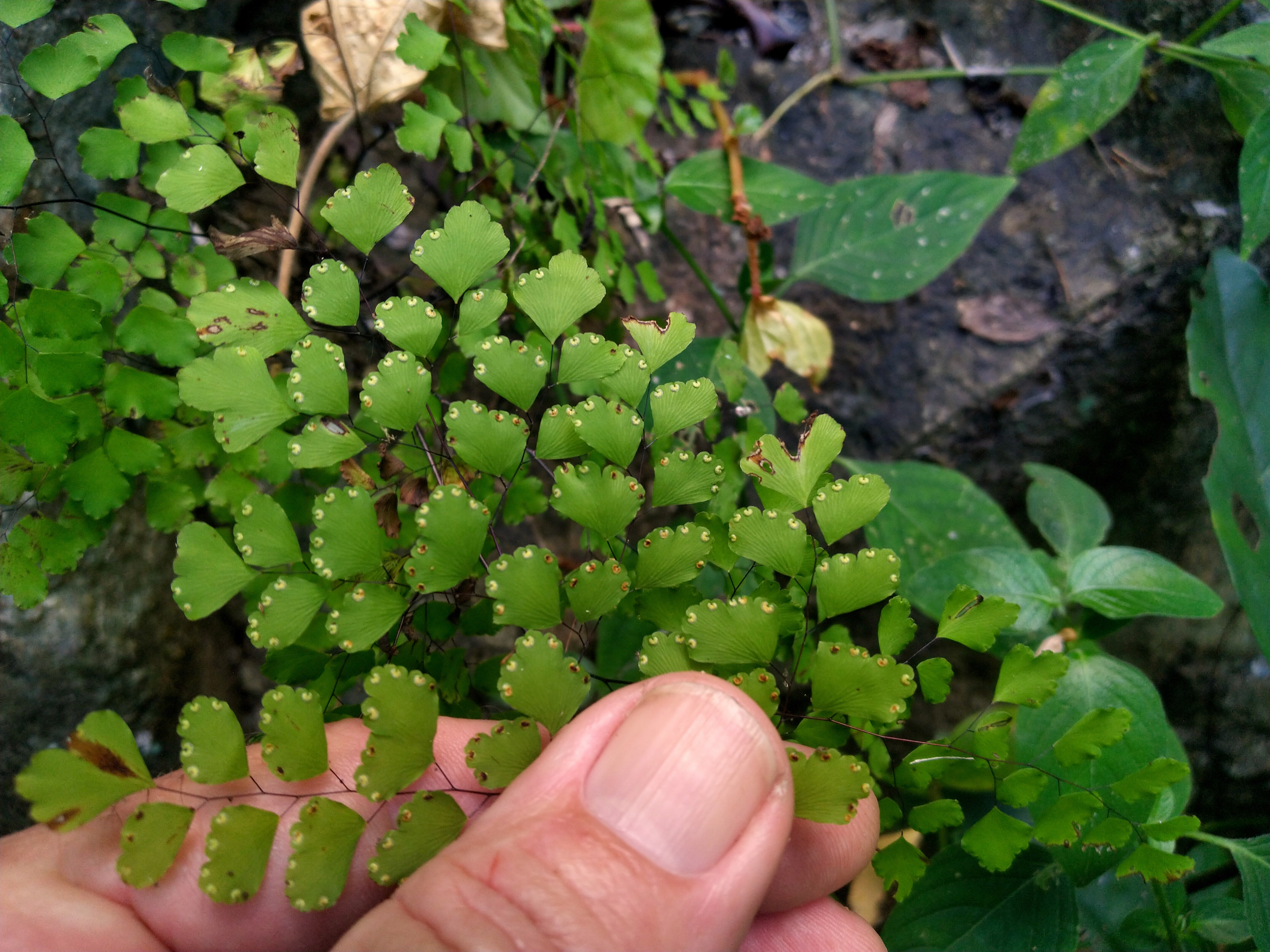
Sori on laminae
