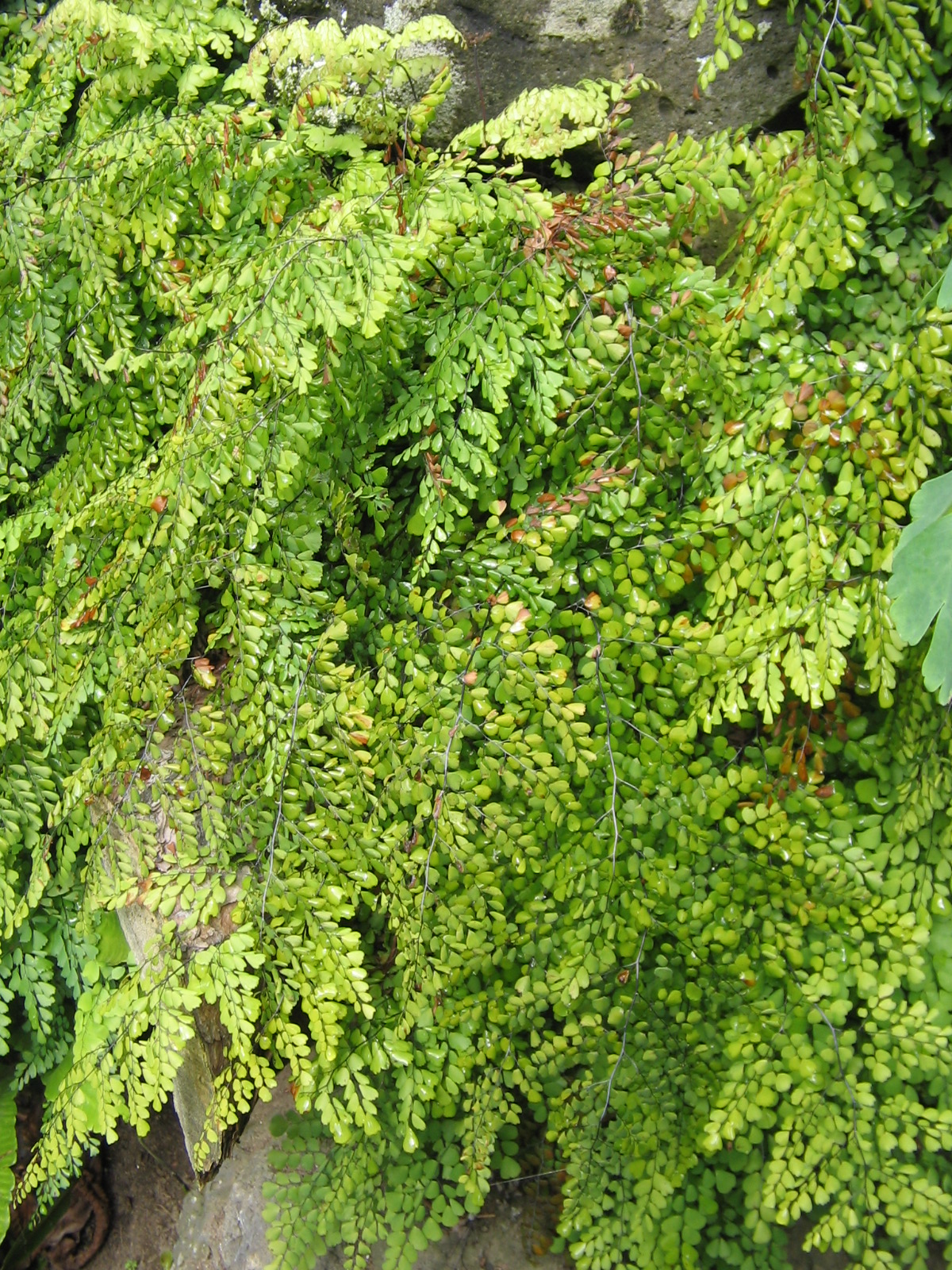
- Fronds

Scientific classification
- Kingdom: Plantae
- Clade: Tracheophytes
- Division: Polypodiophyta
- Class: Polypodiopsida
- Order: Polypodiales
- Family: Pteridaceae
- Genus: Adiantum
- Species: A. venustum

Binomial name
- Adiantum venustum D.Don

= Adiantum venustum =

Himalayan maidenhair

Species of fern

Adiantum venustum, the evergreen maidenhair or Himalayan maidenhair, is a species of fern in the genus Adiantum of the family Pteridaceae, native to China and the Himalayas. It is a slow to establish plant that usually grows on moist rocks and soil with a good amount of humus and dead leaves. It is very hardy, largely evergreen to −10 °C, when it becomes deciduous. It is also known as black Hansraj in India for its black stalks at the fronds.

It typically grows to 15–25 cm tall and up to 0.9 meters wide. The soft green fronds are triangular, with numerous fan-shaped segments on each frond, with black stems. The roots are rhizomatous. The whole plant forms a slowly spreading mat.

== Cultivation ==
This plant is cultivated as an ornamental subject in temperate regions, and has gained the Royal Horticultural Society's Award of Garden Merit. It is extremely hardy, down to at least −20 °C (−4 °F), but requires reliably moist conditions in full or partial shade. In the US, it is suitable for USDA hardiness zones 5–8. It may be susceptible to scale and, in damp winters, rust.

== Uses ==
The fern is used for the treatment of cold, headache, hydrophobia, and inflammation of the chest. It is also used as an antiviral or antibacterial drug. The extract from the rhizome can be used to treat diabetes, liver problems and is a diuretic. It is also suggested that researchers have found ethanolic extract of the leaves and stems of the plant, which is composed of terpenoid, phytosterols, flavonoid, and saponin, are things that control cancer activities. The extract was injected into mice. However, the fern's extract can cause sedation, muscle relaxation and hypnosis in mice.
