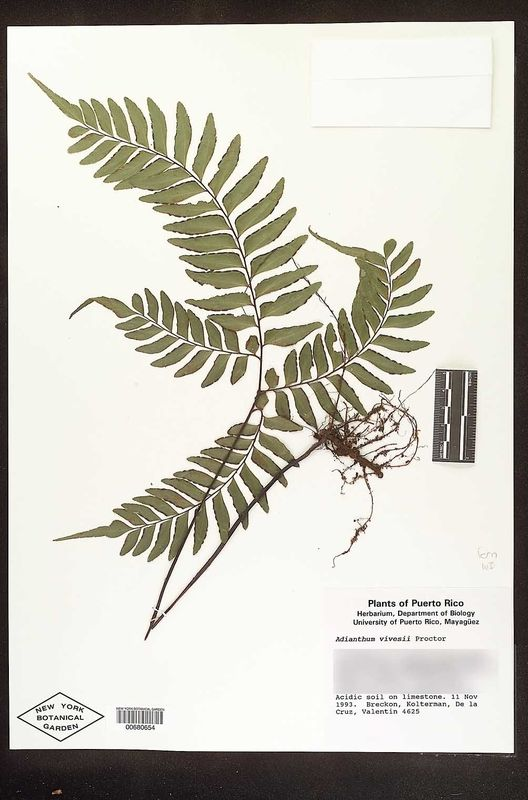

Conservation status
- Delisted (ESA)

Scientific classification
- Kingdom: Plantae
- Clade: Embryophytes
- Clade: Tracheophytes
- Division: Polypodiophyta
- Class: Polypodiopsida
- Order: Polypodiales
- Family: Pteridaceae
- Genus: Adiantum
- Species: A. vivesii

Binomial name
- Adiantum vivesii Proctor 1989

= Adiantum vivesii =

Species of fern

Adiantum vivesii is a sterile hybrid of two common fern species.

== Distribution ==
Adiantum vivesii is endemic to Puerto Rico, where it is known from a single population made up of perhaps 1000 individuals near Quebradillas, in the San Juan – Caguas – Guaynabo metropolitan area on the northern side of the island. The fern was discovered in 1985 and described to science as a new species in 1989. Soon after, it was listed as an endangered species. It is a putative hybrid between Adiantum obliquum and A. tetraphyllum. In 2003 a specimen that most likely represents this species was collected on Petit Morne in Martinique by botanist Maarten Christenhusz collection number 2678 (BM, SP, TUR, U, UC), which means that the hybrid has occurred twice independently.

== Single population — sterile hybrid ==
In 2000, a student at the University of Puerto Rico published a master's thesis detailing her studies of the rare fern. She had carefully dug around most of the single population and discovered it was actually one individual connected by a long rhizome. The fern produces spores but no gametophytes and there were no new, small individuals in the vicinity; the student concluded that the fern does not undergo sexual reproduction, only vegetative reproduction, sprouting up from its extensive rhizome.

Evidence supports the conclusion that the fern is one plant that is a sterile hybrid of two common fern species, and as it does not reproduce but only increases in size by resprouting, it is not a valid species in its own right. Therefore, the United States Fish and Wildlife Service recommends it be removed from the endangered species list.

The delisting of Adiantum vivesii became effective on September 23, 2022, 30 days after its publication in the Federal Register.
