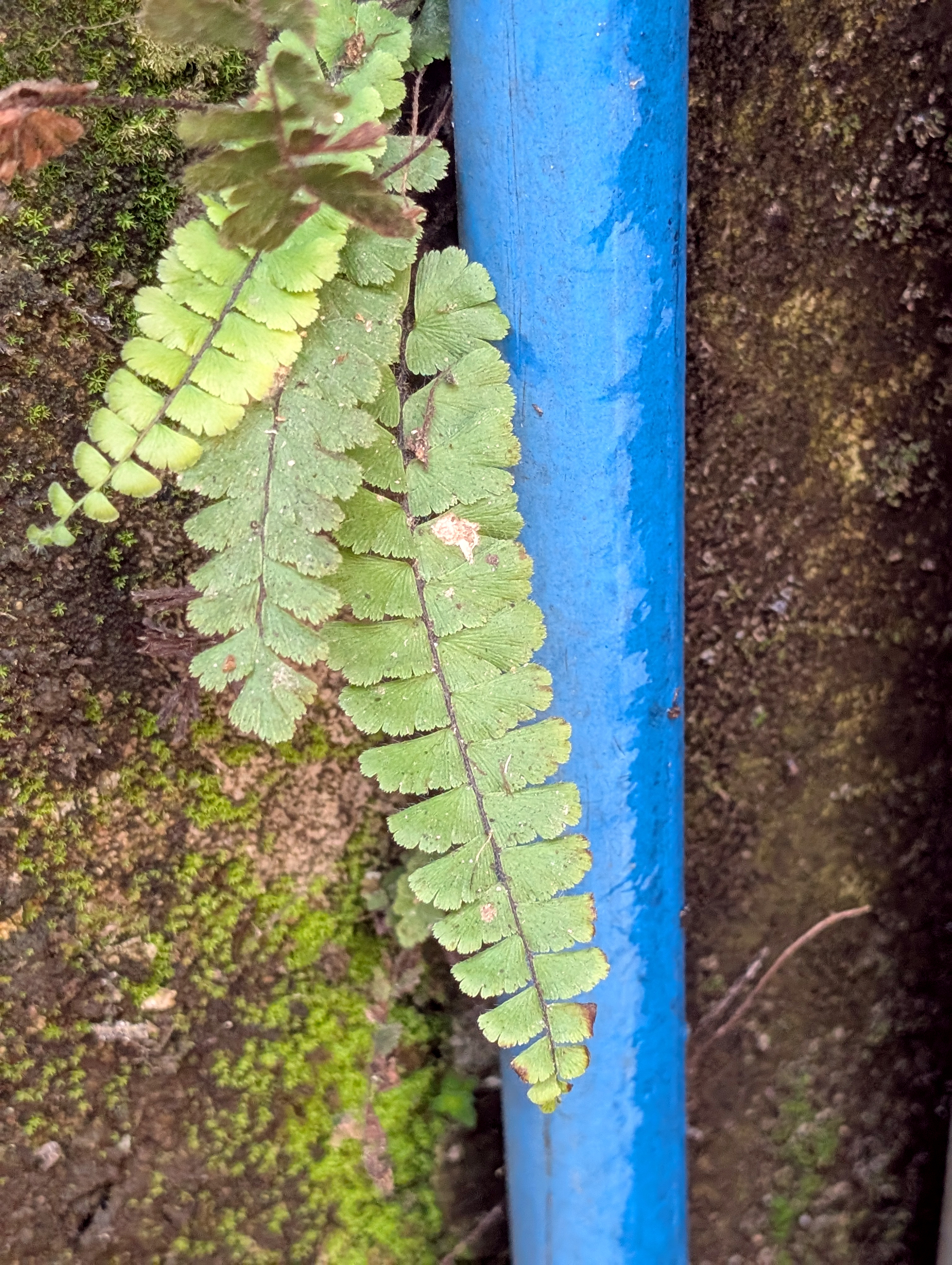
- on a city wall in Guangdong, China

Scientific classification
- Kingdom: Plantae
- Clade: Tracheophytes
- Division: Polypodiophyta
- Class: Polypodiopsida
- Order: Polypodiales
- Family: Pteridaceae
- Genus: Adiantum
- Species: A. ciliatum

Binomial name
- Adiantum ciliatum Blume

Synonyms
- Adiantum malesianum Ghatak; Adiantum caudatum var. latilobatum Bonap.

= Adiantum ciliatum =

ciliate maidenhair fern

Species of fern

Adiantum ciliatum is a species of maidenhair fern. It is native to southern China, Taiwan, Myanmar, Vietnam, Peninsular Malaysia, Sumatra, Borneo, Sumatra, the Maluku Islands, and the Philippines.
