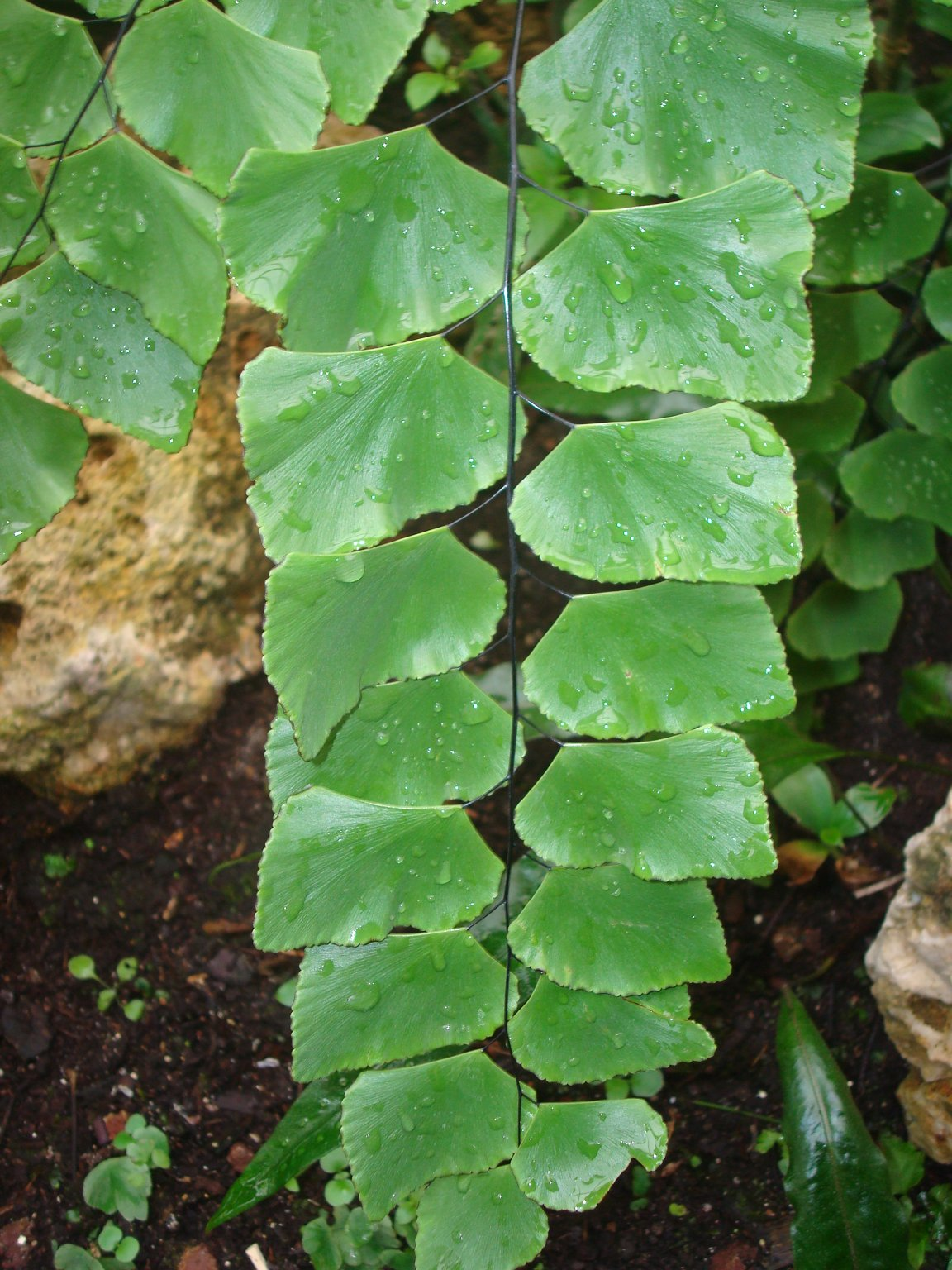

Scientific classification
- Kingdom: Plantae
- Clade: Tracheophytes
- Division: Polypodiophyta
- Class: Polypodiopsida
- Order: Polypodiales
- Family: Pteridaceae
- Genus: Adiantum
- Species: A. peruvianum

Binomial name
- Adiantum peruvianum Klotzsch

= Adiantum peruvianum =

Silver-dollar fern

Species of plant

Adiantum peruvianum, the silver-dollar fern or Peruvian maidenhair, is a fern in the genus Adiantum. It has black stems and large flat pinnules. It is frequently grown as an ornamental greenhouse or houseplant.
