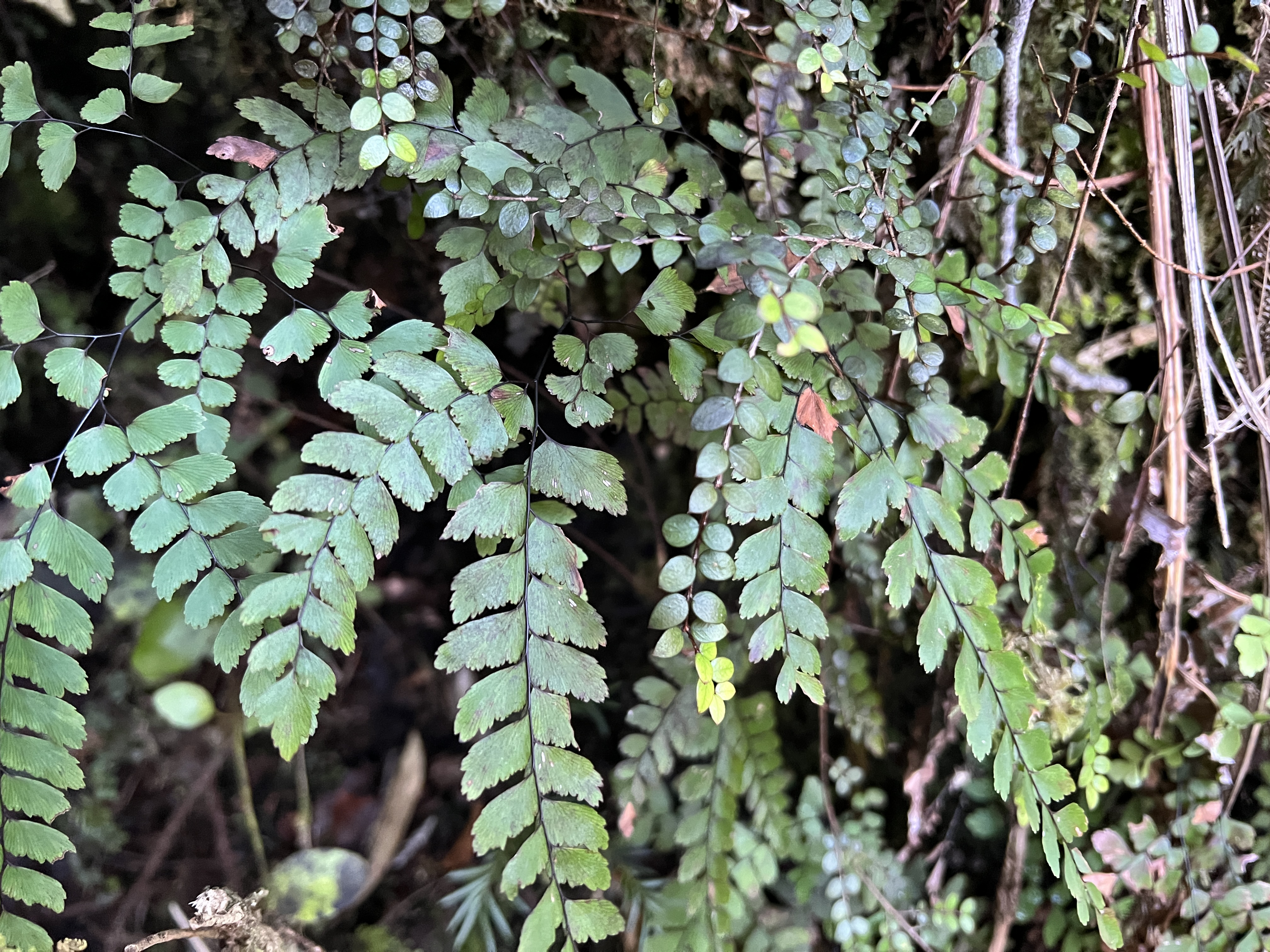

Scientific classification
- Kingdom: Plantae
- Clade: Tracheophytes
- Division: Polypodiophyta
- Class: Polypodiopsida
- Order: Polypodiales
- Family: Pteridaceae
- Genus: Adiantum
- Species: A. cunninghamii

Binomial name
- Adiantum cunninghamii Hook.

= Adiantum cunninghamii =

Species of fern

Adiantum cunninghamii is a maidenhair fern found in New Zealand. The sori are found under the curved leaf margins.
