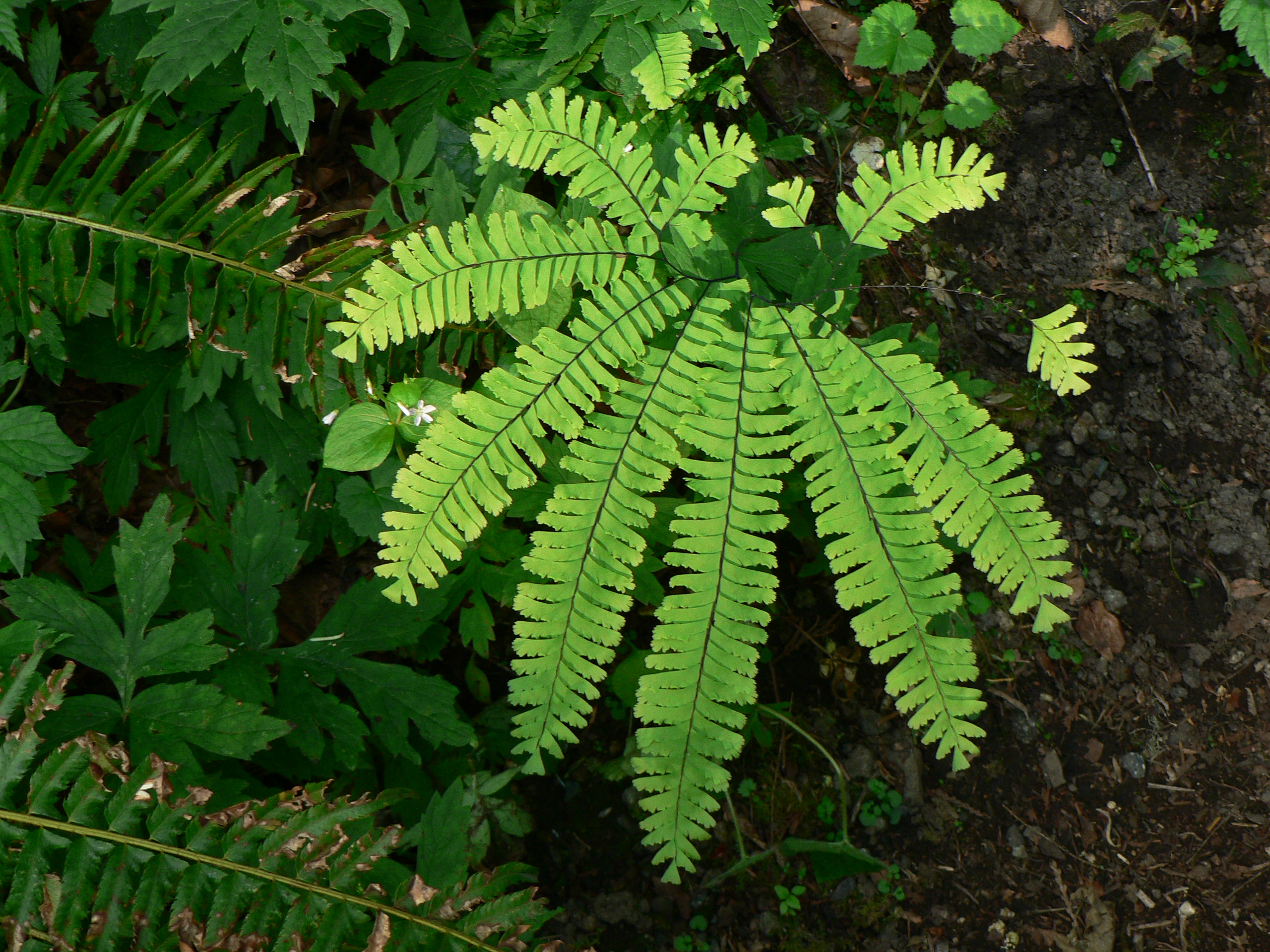
- Western five-fingered fern (Adiantum aleuticum)

Scientific classification
- Kingdom: Plantae
- Clade: Tracheophytes
- Division: Polypodiophyta
- Class: Polypodiopsida
- Order: Polypodiales
- Family: Pteridaceae
- Subfamily: Vittarioideae
- Genus: Adiantum; L.

Type species
- Adiantum capillus-veneris L.

Species
- See text

Synonyms
- Hewardia Smith 1841 non Hooker 1851

= Adiantum =

Adiantum Temporal range: Late Jurassic to Recent (Kimmeridgian-Holocene), 154–0 Ma

Genus of ferns

Adiantum (/ˌædiˈæntəm/), the maidenhair fern (not to be confused with the similar-looking maidenhair spleenwort fern), is a genus of about 250 species of ferns in the subfamily Vittarioideae of the family Pteridaceae, though some researchers place it in its own family, Adiantaceae. The genus name comes from Greek, meaning "unwetted", referring to the fronds' ability to shed water without becoming wet.

== Description ==
They are distinctive in appearance, with dark, often black stipes and rachises, and bright green, often delicately cut leaf tissue. The sori are borne submarginally, and are covered by reflexed flaps of leaf tissue which resemble indusia. Dimorphism between sterile and fertile fronds is generally subtle.

They generally prefer humus-rich, moist, well-drained sites, ranging from bottomland soils to vertical rock walls. Many species are especially known for growing on rock walls around waterfalls and water seepage areas.

The highest species diversity is in the Andes. Fairly high diversity also occurs in eastern Asia, with nearly 40 species in China.

Species native to North America include A. pedatum (five-fingered fern) and the closely related A. aleuticum, which are distinctive in having a bifurcating frond that radiates pinnae on one side only. The cosmopolitan A. capillus-veneris (Venus-hair fern) has a native distribution that extends into the eastern continent. A. jordanii (California Maidenhair) is native to the west coast.

There is a rich Adiantum flora in New Zealand with 3 endemic species (A. cunninghamii, A. viridescens and A. fulvum) in a total of 10 recorded species. Many of these are common especially in the west and south of the islands.

== Cladistics ==
Phylogeny of Adiantum

- - section Adiantellum
  - section Adiantum
    - series Pedata
    - - - series Adiantum
        - - series Venusta
          - series Caudata
      - - series Peruviani
        - series Tetraphylli

== List of species ==
243 species are accepted.

- Adiantum abscissum Schrad.
- Adiantum acrolobum A.Rojas
- Adiantum adiantoides (J.Sm.) C.Chr.
- Adiantum aethiopicum L. – common maidenhair, true maidenhair
- Adiantum × ailaoshanense Y.H.Yan & Ying Wang
- Adiantum alan-smithii R.Y.Hirai, Sundue & J.Prado
- Adiantum alarconianum Gaudich.
- Adiantum aleuticum (Rupr.) C.A.Paris – Aleutian maidenhair, western five-fingered Fern
- Adiantum alleniae S.Linds.
- Adiantum alomae Caluff
- Adiantum amblyopteridium Mickel & Beitel
- Adiantum amplum C.Presl
- Adiantum anceps Maxon & C.V.Morton – double edge maidenhair
- Adiantum andicola Liebm.
- Adiantum aneitense Carruth.
- Adiantum aquismonense Guzm.-Cornejo & Pacheco
- Adiantum argutum Splitg.
- Adiantum atroviride Bostock
- Adiantum balfourii Baker
- Adiantum bellum T.Moore – Bermuda maidenhair
- Adiantum bessoniae Jenman
- Adiantum blumenavense Rosenst.
- Adiantum braunii Mett.
- Adiantum cajennense Willd. ex Klotzsch
- Adiantum calcareum Gardner
- Adiantum camptorachis Sundue, J.Prado & A.R.Sm.
- Adiantum capillatum A.R.Sm. & J.Prado
- Adiantum capillus-junonis Rupr.
- Adiantum capillus-veneris L.– black maidenhair, southern maidenhair, Venus' hair
- Adiantum caribense A.Rojas
- Adiantum caryotideum Christ
- Adiantum caudatum L. – walking maidenhair, tailed maidenhair, trailing maidenhair
- Adiantum celebicum Christ
- Adiantum chienii Ching
- Adiantum chilense Kaulf.
- Adiantum ciliatum Blume
- Adiantum cinnamomeum Lellinger & J.Prado
- Adiantum comoroense (Tardieu) Verdc.
- Adiantum concinnum Humb. & Bonpl. ex Willd. – polished maidenhair, brittle maidenhair
- Adiantum confine Fée
- Adiantum cordatum Maxon
- Adiantum cremersii Boudrie & J.Prado
- Adiantum crespianum Bosco
- Adiantum cunninghamii Hook.
- Adiantum cupreum Copel.
- Adiantum curvatum Kaulf.
- Adiantum davidii Franch.
- Adiantum dawsonii Lellinger & J.Prado
- Adiantum decipiens Desv.
- Adiantum decoratum Maxon & Weath.
- Adiantum deflectens Mart.
- Adiantum delicatulum Mart.
- Adiantum deltoideum Sw.
- Adiantum dentatum A.H.Wang, F.G.Wang & F.W.Xing
- Adiantum diaphanum Blume – filmy maidenhair, small maidenhair.
- Adiantum digitatum Hook.
- Adiantum dioganum Glaz. ex Baker
- Adiantum diphyllum Maxon
- Adiantum discolor J.Prado
- Adiantum dissimulatum Jenman
- Adiantum dolosum Kunze
- Adiantum edgeworthii Hook.
- Adiantum elegantulum Maxon
- Adiantum erylliae Tardieu & C.Chr.
- Adiantum erythrochlamys Diels
- Adiantum excisum Kuntze – Chilean maidenhair
- Adiantum feei T.Moore ex Fée
- Adiantum fengianum Ching
- Adiantum filiforme Gardner
- Adiantum flabellulatum L.
- Adiantum flabellum C.Chr.
- Adiantum formosanum Tagawa
- Adiantum formosum R.Br. – giant maidenhair, Australian maidenhair
- Adiantum forzzanum R.Y.Hirai & J.Prado
- Adiantum fournieri Copel.
- Adiantum fragile Sw. – fragile maidenhair
- Adiantum fragiliforme C.Chr.
- Adiantum fructuosum Kunze
- Adiantum fuliginosum Fée
- Adiantum fulvum Raoul
- Adiantum galeottianum Hook.
- Adiantum gertrudis Espinosa
- Adiantum giganteum J.Prado
- Adiantum gingkoides C.Chr.
- Adiantum glabrum Copel.
- Adiantum glaucescens Klotzsch
- Adiantum gomphophyllum Baker
- Adiantum gracile Feé
- Adiantum granvilleanum Boudrie & J.Prado
- Adiantum gravesii Hance
- Adiantum grossum Mett.
- Adiantum henslovianum Hook.f.
- Adiantum hirsutum Bory
- Adiantum hispidulum Sw. – rough maidenhair, rosy maidenhair
- Adiantum hollandiae Alderw.
- Adiantum hornei Baker
- Adiantum hosei Baker
- Adiantum humile Kunze
- Adiantum imbricatum R.M.Tryon
- Adiantum incertum Lindm.
- Adiantum incisum Forssk.
- Adiantum induratum Christ
- Adiantum intermedium Sw.
- Adiantum isthmicum B.Zimmer
- Adiantum × janzenianum A.Rojas & C.Herrera
- Adiantum japonicum T.Zhao, Z.Y.Zuo, J.Wen & J.Mei Lu
- Adiantum jordanii Müll.Hal. – California maidenhair
- Adiantum juxtapositum Ching
- Adiantum kendalii Jenman
- Adiantum kingii Copel.
- Adiantum klossii Gepp
- Adiantum krameri B.Zimmer
- Adiantum lamrianum Bidin & R.Jaman
- Adiantum latifolium Lam. – broadleaf maidenhair
- Adiantum latipinnulum Boudrie & J.Prado
- Adiantum leprieurii Hook.
- †Adiantum lianxianense Ching & Y.X.Lin
- Adiantum lindsaeoides J.Prado & R.Y.Hirai
- Adiantum lobatum C.Presl
- Adiantum longzhouensis A.H.Wang, F.G.Wang & F.W.Xing
- Adiantum lorentzii Hieron.
- Adiantum lucidum (Cav.) Sw.
- Adiantum macrocladum Klotzsch
- Adiantum macrophyllum Sw. – largeleaf maidenhair
- Adiantum madagascariense H.Rosend.
- Adiantum malesianum J.Ghatak
- Adiantum mariesii Baker
- Adiantum mariposatum M.R.McCarthy & Hickey
- Adiantum mathewsianum Hook.
- Adiantum matogrossense R.Y.Hirai & J.Prado
- Adiantum mcvaughii Mickel & Beitel
- Adiantum × meishanianum F.S.Hsu ex Yea C.Liu & W.L.Chiou
- Adiantum melanoleucum Willd. – fragrant maidenhair
- Adiantum membranifolium S.Linds. & Suksathan
- Adiantum mendoncae Alston
- Adiantum menglianense Y.Y.Qian
- Adiantum mindanaoense. Copel.
- Adiantum monochlamys D.C.Eaton
- Adiantum monosorum Baker
- Adiantum moorei Baker
- Adiantum × moranii J.Prado
- Adiantum multisorum A.Samp.
- Adiantum myriosorum Baker
- Adiantum nelumboides X.C.Zhang
- Adiantum neoguineense T.Moore
- Adiantum nodosum J.Prado, R.Y.Hirai & A.R.Sm.
- Adiantum novae-caledoniae Keyserl.
- Adiantum nudum A.R.Sm.
- Adiantum oatesii Baker
- Adiantum oaxacanum Mickel & Beitel
- Adiantum obliquum Willd. – oblique maidenhair
- Adiantum obovatum A.H.Wang, F.G.Wang & F.W.Xing
- Adiantum ogasawarense Tagawa
- Adiantum olivaceum Baker
- Adiantum orbignyanum Mett.
- Adiantum ornithopodum C.Presl ex Kuhn
- Adiantum ovalescens Fée
- Adiantum palaoense C.Chr.
- Adiantum papilio Rakotondr. & Hemp
- Adiantum papillosum Handro
- Adiantum paraense Hieron.
- Adiantum parishii Hook.
- Adiantum patens Willd.
- Adiantum pearcei Phil.
- Adiantum pectinatum Kunze & Ettingsh.
- Adiantum pedatum L. – northern maidenhair, five-fingered fern
- Adiantum pentadactylon Langsd. & Fisch.
- Adiantum peruvianum Klotzsch – silver-dollar fern, Peruvian maidenhair
- Adiantum petiolatum Desv. – stalked maidenhair
- Adiantum phanerophlebium (Baker) C.Chr.
- Adiantum phanomensis S.Linds. & D.J.Middleton
- Adiantum philippense L.
- Adiantum phyllitidis J.Sm.
- Adiantum platyphyllum Sw.
- Adiantum poeppigianum C.Presl
- Adiantum poiretti Wikstr.
- Adiantum polyphyllum Willd.– giant maidenhair
- Adiantum proliferum Roxb.
- Adiantum pseudocajennense J.Prado, R.Y.Hirai & A.R.Sm.
- Adiantum pseudotinctum Hieron.
- Adiantum pulchellum Blume
- Adiantum pulcherrimum Copel.
- Adiantum pulverulentum L. – glossy maidenhair
- Adiantum pumilum Sw.
- Adiantum pyramidale (L.) Willd. – pyramid maidenhair
- Adiantum raddianum C.Presl – delta maidenhair
- Adiantum rectangulare Lindm.
- Adiantum reniforme L. – lotus-leaved maidenhair fern
- Adiantum reptans A.Rojas
- Adiantum rhizophorum Sw.
- Adiantum rhizophytum Schrad.
- Adiantum rivulare Boudrie & J.Prado
- Adiantum rhizophorum Sw.
- Adiantum roborowskii Maxim.
- Adiantum rodriguezii J.Prado, R.Y.Hirai & Sundue
- Adiantum rondonii A.Samp.
- Adiantum ruizianum Klotzsch
- Adiantum scabrum Kaulf.
- Adiantum scalare R.M.Tryon
- Adiantum schweinfurthii Kuhn
- Adiantum seemannii Hook. – Seeman's maidenhair
- Adiantum semiorbiculatum Bonap.
- Adiantum sericeum D.C.Eaton
- Adiantum serratifolium Alderw.
- Adiantum serratodentatum Willd.
- Adiantum shastense Huiet & A.R.Sm.
- Adiantum shepherdii Hook.
- Adiantum siamense Tagawa & K.Iwats.
- Adiantum silvaticum Tindale
- Adiantum soboliferum Wall. ex Hook.
- Adiantum solomonii J.Prado
- Adiantum × spurium Jermy & T.G.Walker
- Adiantum squamulosum J.Prado & A.R.Sm.
- Adiantum stenochlamys Baker
- Adiantum stolzii Brause
- Adiantum subcordatum Sw. – big maidenhair
- Adiantum subvolubile Mett.
- Adiantum sulphureum Kaulf.
- Adiantum taiwanianum Tagawa
- Adiantum tenerum Sw. – fan maidenhair, brittle maidenhair
- Adiantum terminatum Kunze ex Miq.
- Adiantum tetragonum Schrad.
- Adiantum tetraphyllum Humb. & Bonpl. ex Willd. – fourleaf maidenhair
- Adiantum thongthamii Suksathan
- Adiantum tibeticum Ching & Y.X.Lin
- Adiantum tinctum Veitch
- Adiantum tomentosum Klotzsch
- Adiantum × tracyi C.C.Hall ex W.H.Wagner
- Adiantum trapeziforme L. – diamond maidenhair
- Adiantum trichochlaenum Mickel & Beitel
- Adiantum tricholepis Feé – fuzzy maidenhair
- Adiantum trilobum L.
- Adiantum tripteris K.U.Kramer
- Adiantum tryonii J.Prado
- Adiantum tuomistoanum J.Prado
- Adiantum urophyllum Hook.
- Adiantum venustum D.Don – evergreen maidenhair, Himalayan maidenhair.
- Adiantum villosissimum Mett.
- Adiantum villosum L. – woolly maidenhair
- Adiantum viridimontanum C.A.Paris – Green Mountain maidenhair
- Adiantum viscosum A.Cádiz-Véliz & A.E.Villarroel
- Adiantum vivesii Proctor – Puerto Rico maidenhair
- Adiantum vogelii Mett.
- Adiantum wattii Baker
- Adiantum weatherbyanum Espinosa
- Adiantum wilesianum Hook.
- Adiantum wilsonii Hook. – Wilson's maidenhair
- Adiantum windischii J.Prado
- Adiantum zollingeri Mett.

== Cultivation ==
Many species are grown in the horticultural trade. There are a number of tropical species, including A. raddianum and A. peruvianum. Both A. pedatum and A. aleuticum are hardy to zone 3, and are by far the most cold-hardy members of the genus. A. venustum is also cold-hardy to zone 5. A. capillus-veneris is hardy to zone 7. Hybrids, such as Adiantum × mairisii, are also popular.

== Gallery ==
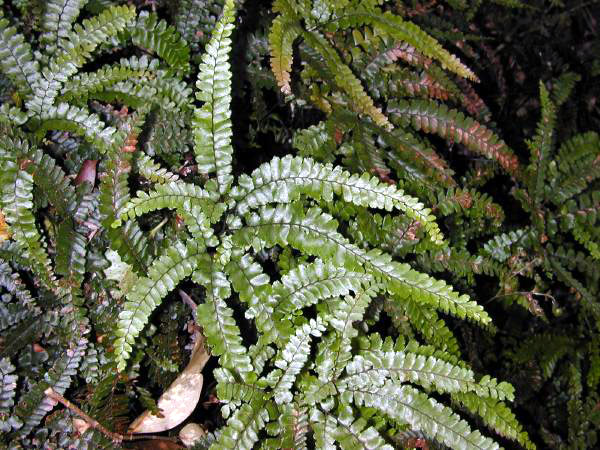
Rough Maidenhair Fern (Adiantum hispidulum)

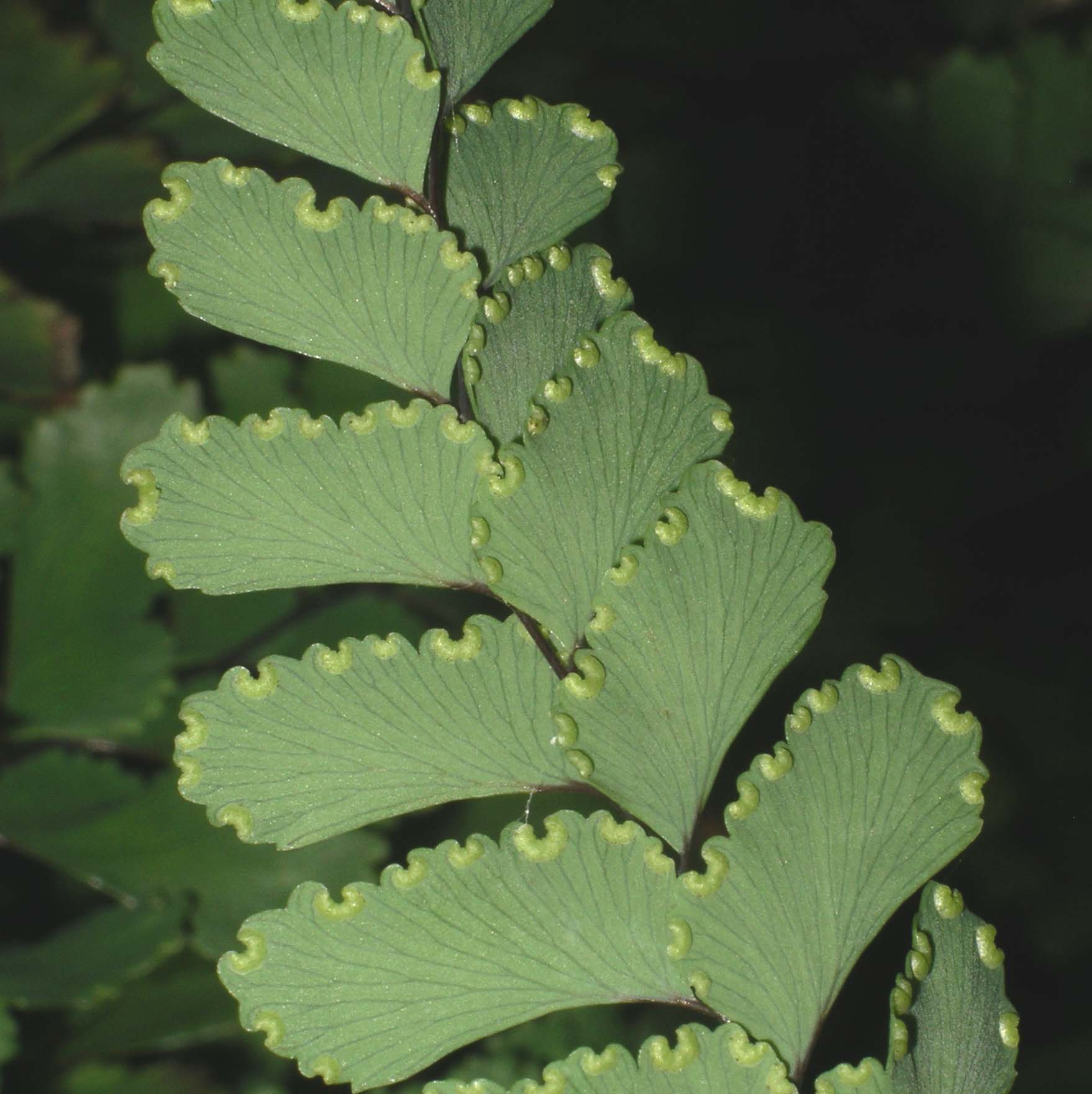
Adiantum cunninghamii showing characteristic inrolled leaf margin containing sori

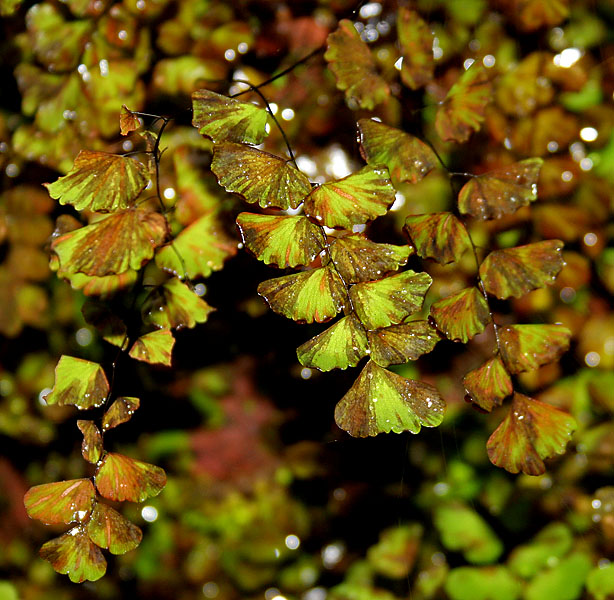
Adiantum lunulatum in Goa, India.

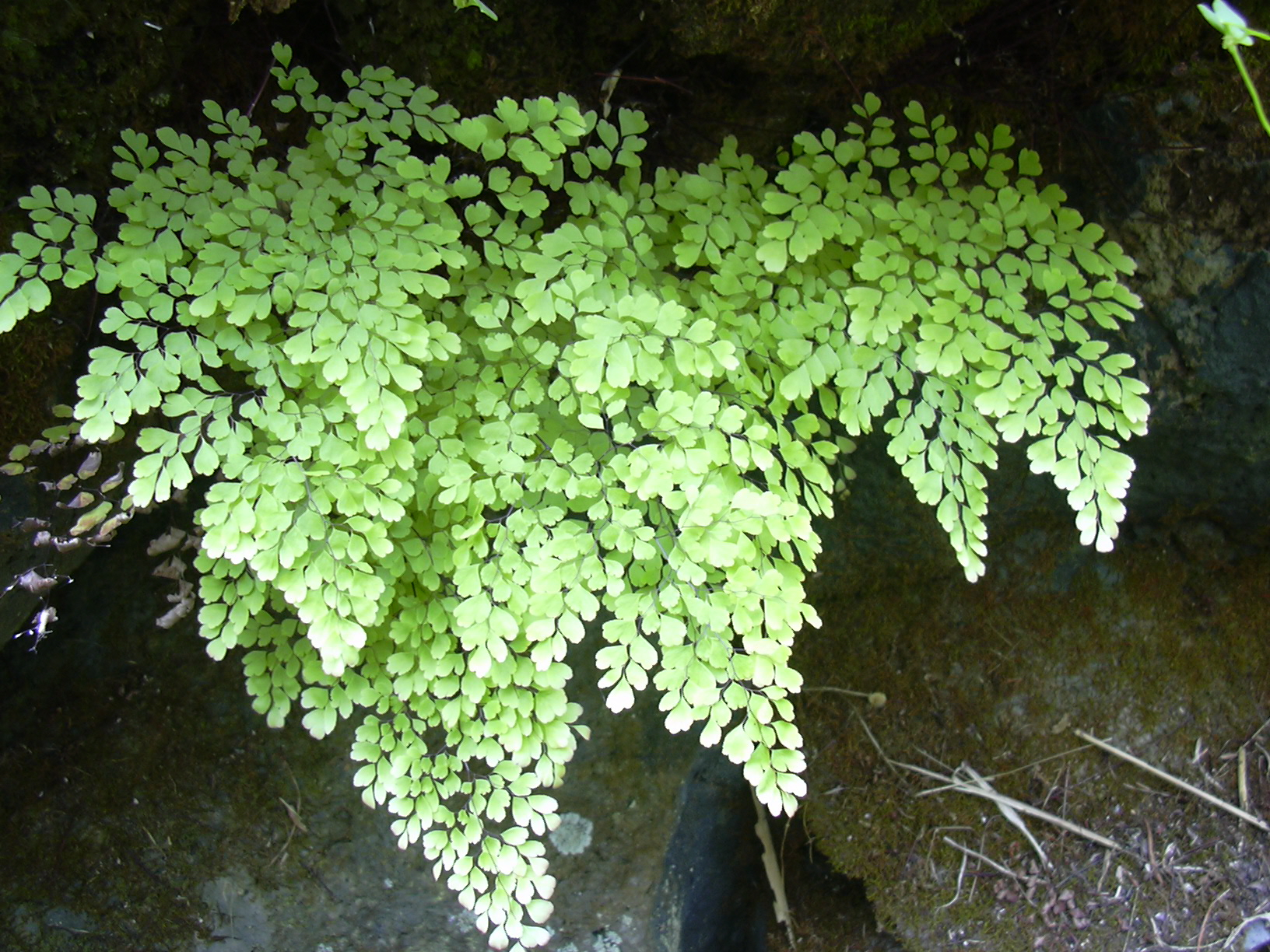
Delta Maidenhair (Adiantum raddianum)
