= Adiantum incisum =

Conservation status
- Endangered (IUCN 3.1)

Scientific classification
- Kingdom: Plantae
- Clade: Tracheophytes
- Division: Polypodiophyta
- Class: Polypodiopsida
- Order: Polypodiales
- Family: Pteridaceae
- Genus: Adiantum
- Species: A. incisum

Binomial name
- Adiantum incisum Forssk.

Subspecies
- Adiantum incisum subsp. incisum; Adiantum incisum subsp. indicum (J.Ghatak) Fraser-Jenk.

Species of plant

Adiantum incisum is a species of fern in the Vittarioideae subfamily of the Pteridaceae. It is a perennial or lithophyte native to western, southern, and eastern tropical Africa, the Arabian Peninsula, Indian Subcontinent, Myanmar, and south-central China. Its natural habitat is subtropical or tropical moist lowland forests. It is threatened by habitat loss.

Two subspecies are accepted:

- Adiantum incisum subsp. incisum (synonyms Adiantum capillus-gorgonis Webb, A. caudatum var. capillus-gorgonis (Webb) Cout., A. caudatum var. laciniatum Bonap., A. sinicum Ching, and A. vestitum Wall.) – western, southern, and eastern tropical Africa, Arabian Peninsula, Indian Subcontinent, Myanmar, and south-central China
- Adiantum incisum subsp. indicum (J.Ghatak) Fraser-Jenk. (synonyms Adiantum indicum J.Ghatak A. recurvatum D.Don, A. caudatum var. flabellatum B.K.Nayar, and A. recurvatum (D.Don) Fraser-Jenk.) – India, Myanmar, Nepal, and Sri Lanka

The species is assessed as endangered by the IUCN Red List under the synonym Adiantum indicum, with a distribution limited to China.
