= List of pteridophytes of Sri Lanka =

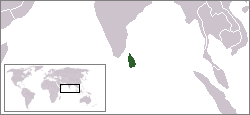
Location of Sri Lanka

Sri Lanka is a tropical island situated close to the southern tip of India. The invertebrate fauna is as large as it is common to other regions of the world. There are about 2 million species of arthropods found in the world, and more are still being discovered to this day. This makes it very complicated and difficult to summarize the exact number of species found within a certain region.

This is a list of the pteridophytes found from Sri Lanka.

== Pteridophytes ==
Pteridophytes are vascular plants which reproduce by spores. These free sporing vascular plants show a remarkable life cycle with independent gametophyte and sporophyte generations. Pteridophytes are composed of ferns and lycophytes. Ferns consist of stems, leaves and roots. The stem is usually referred to as rhizome, which is sometimes underground in nature. Most species show stolons and few are with semi-woody trunks. Leaves are referred to as a frond. New leaves typically expand by the unrolling of a tight spiral, the phenomenon known as circinate vernation. There are about 10,560 known species of ferns in the world.

Lycopods are belong to the division Lycopodiophyta, and some are homosporous while others are heterosporous. They differ from ferns due to presence of microphylls, which are the leaves that have only a single vascular trace. There are two extant classes of lycopods, which contains a total of 12 genera and 1290 known species.

The earliest notes on pteridophyte diversity of Sri Lanka dated back to 1887 with Baker's Handbook to the Fern Allies and then in 1892 with Beddome's Handbook to the Ferns of British India, Ceylon, and the Malay Peninsula. In 1947, Copeland adopted a taxonomical system to describe modern taxa of pteridophytes of Sri Lanka. Based on these publications, Prof. R.N. de Fonseka and Mr. M.A.B Jansen prepared the checklist of the pteidophytes of Sri Lanka in 1978. Since then, many experiments and research were carried out about particular families which are important to economy.

The following article is based on the checklist by Fonseka and Jansen in 1978.

== Division Pteridophyta ==
=== Class Equisetopsida ===
==== Order Equisetales ====
===== Family Equisetaceae - Horsetails =====
- Equisetum debile

=== Class Marattiopsida ===
==== Order Marattiales ====
===== Family Marattiaceae =====
- Angiopteris evecta
- Marattia fraxinea

==== Order Ophioglossales ====
===== Family Ophioglossaceae - Adder's-tongue ferns =====
- Botrychium daucifolium
- Botrychium lanuginosum
- Helminthostachys zeylanica
- Ophioglossum gramineum
- Ophioglossum pedunculosum
- Ophioglossum pendulum
- Ophioglossum petiolatum
- Ophioglossum reticulatum

=== Class Polypodiopsida ===
==== Order Cyatheales ====
===== Family Cyatheaceae - Scaly tree ferns =====
- Cyathea crinita
- Cyathea gigantea
- Cyathea hookeri
- Cyathea sinuata
- Cyathea srilankensis
- Cyathea walkerae

==== Order Gleicheniales ====
===== Family Gleicheniaceae - Forked ferns =====
- Dicranopteris linearis

==== Order Hymenophyllales ====
===== Family Hymenophyllaceae - Bristle ferns =====
- Hymenophyllum denticulatum
- Hymenophyllum gardneri
- Hymenophyllum javanicum
- Hymenophyllum macriglossum
- Hymenophyllum polyanthos
- Trichomanes bilabiatum
- Trichomanes bimarginatum
- Trichomanes exiguum
- Trichomanes intramarginale
- Trichomanes kurzii
- Trichomanes motleyi
- Trichomanes nitidulum
- Trichomanes obscurum
- Trichomanes pallidum
- Trichomanes plicatum
- Trichomanes proliferum
- Trichomanes saxifragoides
- Trichomanes wallii

==== Order Osmundales ====
===== Family Osmundaceae - Flowering ferns =====
- Osmunda javanica

==== Order Polypodiales ====
===== Family Athyriaceae =====
- Anisocampium cumingianum
- Athyrium anisopterum
- Athyrium hohenackeranum
- Athyrium macrocarpon
- Athyrium nigripes
- Athyrium praetermissum - var. erythrorachis, tripinnatum
- Athyrium solenopteris - var. pusillum
- Deparia boryana
- Diplazium beddomei
- Diplazium cognatum
- Diplazium decurrens
- Diplazium dilatatum
- Diplazium esculentum
- Diplazium lasiopteris
- Diplazium muricatum
- Diplazium paradoxum
- Diplazium polyrhizon
- Diplazium procumbens
- Diplazium subsinuatum
- Diplazium sylvaticum
- Diplazium travancoricum
- Diplazium zeylanicum

===== Family Aspleniaceae - Spleenworts =====
- Asplenium aethiopicum
- Asplenium affines
- Asplenium cheilosorum
- Asplenium decorum
- Asplenium decrescens
- Asplenium disjunctum
- Asplenium ensiforme
- Asplenium erectum
- Asplenium falcatum
- Asplenium formosum
- Asplenium gardneri
- Asplenium indicum
- Asplenium inaequilaterale
- Asplenium longipes
- Asplenium nidus
- Asplenium nitidum
- Asplenium normale
- Asplenium obscurum
- Asplenium pellucidum
- Asplenium serricula
- Asplenium tenuifolium
- Asplenium tenerum
- Asplenium unilaterale
- Asplenium varians
- Asplenium zenkeranum

===== Family Blechnaceae =====
- Blechnum occidentale
- Blechnum orientale
- Blechnum patersonii
- Doodia dives
- Stenochlaena aculeata
- Stenochlaena palustris

===== Family Cystopteridaceae =====
- Cystopteris fragilis
- Cystopteris tenuiseta

===== Family Davalliaceae =====
- Araiostegia hymenophylloides
- Araiostegia pulchra
- Davallia denticulata
- Davallia trichomanoides
- Humata repens
- Humata vestita

===== Family Dennstaedtiaceae =====
- Dennstaedtia scabra
- Histiopteris incisa
- Hypolepis punctata
- Microlepia firma
- Microlepia majuscula
- Microlepia platyphylla
- Microlepia speluncae
- Microlepia strigosa
- Microlepia trapeziformis
- Pteridium aquilinum

===== Family Diplaziopsidaceae =====
- Diplaziopsis javanica

===== Family Dryopteridaceae - Wood ferns =====
- Arachniodes amabilis
- Arachniodes aristata
- Arachniodes tripinnata
- Bolbitis bradfordi
- Bolbitis mollis
- Bolbitis subcrenata
- Bolbitis virens
- Ctenitis ferruginea var. obtusiloba
- Ctenitis rhodolepis
- Dryopteris approximata
- Dryopteris ambigua
- Dryopteris deparioides subsp. concinna
- Dryopteris hirtipes
- Dryopteris gracillima var. prolongata, triangularis
- Dryopteris obtusissima
- Dryopteris pulvinulifera
- Dryopteris sparsa
- Dryopteris wallichiana
- Elaphoglossum angulatum
- Elaphoglossum ceylanicum
- Elaphoglossum commutatum
- Elaphoglossum spatulatum
- Egenolfia appendiculata
- Lastreopsis rufescens
- Lastreopsis tenera
- Peranema aspidioides
- Polystichum anomalum
- Polystichum auriculatum
- Polystichum biaristatum
- Polystichum setiferum var. nigropaleaceum
- Polystichum tacticopterum
- Polystichum walkerae var. bipinnatum

===== Family Hypodematiaceae =====
- Hypodematium crenatum

===== Family Lindsaeaceae =====
- Lindsaea caudata
- Lindsaea cultrata
- Lindsaea decomposita
- Lindsaea ensifolia
- Lindsaea heterophylla
- Lindsaea macraeana
- Lindsaea lancea
- Lindsaea orbiculata
- Lindsaea tenera
- Lindsaea walkerae - syn. Isoloma walkerae
- Sphenomeris chusana

===== Family Nephrolepidaceae - Swordferns =====
- Nephrolepis biserrata
- Nephrolepis cordifolia
- Nephrolepis exaltata
- Nephrolepis falcata
- Nephrolepis hirsutula

===== Family Oleandraceae =====
- Oleandra musifolia

===== Family Polypodiaceae - Polypod ferns =====
- Belvisia mucronata
- Belvisia revoluta
- Bosmania membranacea (syn. Microsorum membranaceum)
- Calymmodon cucullatus
- Ctenopteris glandulosa
- Ctenopteris mooltonii
- Ctenopteris repandula
- Ctenopteris subfalcata
- Ctenopteris thwaitesii
- Drymoglossum heterophyllum
- Drynaria quercifolia
- Drynaria sparsisora
- Grammitis attenuata
- Grammitis medialis
- Grammitis reinwardtii
- Grammitis wallii
- Grammitis zeylanica
- Leptochilus decurrens
- Leptochilus matallicus
- Leptochilus thwaitesianus
- Leptochilus wallii
- Loxogramme involuta
- Loxogramme parallela
- Microsorum dilatatum
- Microsorum nigrescens
- Microsorum punctatum
- Microsorum pteropus
- Microsorum scolopendria
- Pleopeltis amarurolepida
- Pleopeltis macrocarpa
- Pleopeltis nuda
- Prosaptia alata
- Prosaptia contigua
- Prosaptia khasyana
- Prosaptia obliquata
- Pyrrosia ceylanica
- Pyrrosia gardneri
- Pyrrosia lanceolata
- Pyrrosia mollis
- Pyrrosia pannosa
- Scleroglossum sulcatum
- Selliguea montanus
- Xiphopteris cornigera

===== Family Pteridaceae =====
- Acrostichum aureum
- Actiniopteris australia
- Adiantum capillus-veneris
- Adiantum caudatum
- Adiantum concinnum
- Adiantum diaphanum
- Adiantum flabellulatum
- Adiantum formosum
- Adiantum hispidulum
- Adiantum latifolium
- Adiantum philippense
- Adiantum poiretii
- Adiantum pulverulentum
- Adiantum raddianum
- Adiantum trapeziforme
- Adiantum zollingeri
- Aleuritopteris farinosa
- Anogramma leptophylla
- Antrophyum plantagineum
- Antrophyum reticulatum
- Ceratopteris thalictroides
- Cheilanthes mysorensis
- Cheilanthes thwaitesii
- Cheilanthes tenuifolia
- Coniogramme fraxinea
- Doryopteris concolor
- Hemionitis arifolia
- Pellaea boivini
- Pellaea falcata
- Pityrogramma calomelanos
- Pityrogramma chrysophylla
- Pteris biaurita
- Pteris cretica
- Pteris endiformis
- Pteris gardneri
- Pteris hookerana
- Pteris longipes
- Pteris quadriaurita var. ludens
- Pteris tripartita
- Pteris vittata
- Taenitis blechnoides
- Vaginularia paradoxa
- Vittaria elongata
- Vittaria flexuosa
- Vittaria scolopendrina

===== Family Tectariaceae =====
- Arthropteris obliterata
- Pteridrys syrmatica
- Pteridrys zeylanica
- Tectaria coadunata
- Tectaria decurrens
- Tectaria devexa
- Tectaria paradoxa
- Tectaria polymorpha
- Tectaria subtriphylla
- Tectaria thwaitesii
- Tectaria trimenii
- Tectaria zeilanica

===== Family Thelypteridaceae =====
- Ampelopteris prolifera
- Cyclosorus arbuscula
- Cyclosorus dentatus
- Cyclosorus extensus
- Cyclosorus gongyiodes var. glabrus, hirsutus
- Cyclosorus interruptus
- Cyclosorus jaculosus
- Cyclosorus latipinna
- Cyclosorus megaphyllus
- Cyclosorus papilio
- Cyclosorus parasiticus
- Cyclosorus penangianus
- Cyclosorus repandulus
- Cyclosorus subpubescens
- Cyclosorus thwaitesii
- Cyclosorus triphyllus
- Cyclosorus truncatus
- Cyclosorus unitus
- Cyclosorus urophyllus
- Stegnogramma mollissima - syn. Leptogramma mollissima
- Stegnogramma aspidioides
- Thelypteris beddomei
- Thelypteris brunnea
- Thelypteris ciliata
- Thelypteris flaccida
- Thelypteris uliginosa
- Thelypteris xylodes

==== Order Salviniales ====
===== Family Marsileaceae Pepperworts =====
- Marsilea minuta
- Marsilea quadrifolia

===== Family Salviniaceae - Salvinias =====
- Azolla pinnata
- Salvinia molesta

==== Order Schizaeales ====
===== Family Lygodiaceae - Climbing ferns =====
- Lygodium circinnatum
- Lygodium flexuosum
- Lygodium japonicum
- Lygodium microphyllum

===== Family Schizaeaceae =====
- Schizaea dichotoma
- Schizaea digitata

=== Class Psilotopsida ===
==== Order Psilotales ====
===== Family Psilotaceae - Whisk ferns =====
- Psilotum nudum

== Division Lycopodiophyta ==
=== Class Isoetopsida ===
==== Order Selaginellales ====
===== Family Selaginellaceae - Spike mosses =====
- Selaginella brachystachya
- Selaginella calostachya
- Selaginella ciliaris
- Selaginella cochleata
- Selaginella crassipes
- Selaginella intermedia
- Selaginella involvens
- Selaginella ornithopodioides
- Selaginella praetermissa
- Selaginella tenera
- Selaginella wightii

==== Order Isoetales ====
===== Family Isoetaceae - Quillworts =====
- Isoetes coromandeliana

=== Class Lycopodiopsida ===
==== Order Lycopodiales ====
===== Family Lycopodiaceae - Clubmosses =====
- Lycopodium carolinianum
- Lycopodium cernuum
- Lycopodium ceylanicum
- Lycopodium clavatum
- Lycopodium complnataum
- Lycopodium hamiltonii
- Lycopodium phlegmaria
- Lycopodium pulcherrimum
- Lycopodium squarrosum
- Lycopodium serratum
- Lycopodium wightianum
