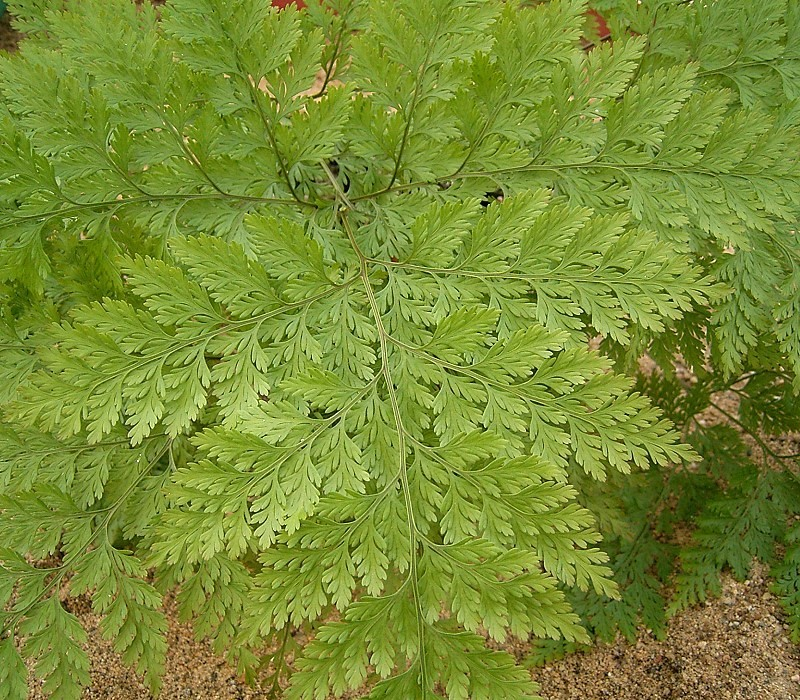

Conservation status
- Least Concern (IUCN 3.1)

Scientific classification
- Kingdom: Plantae
- Clade: Tracheophytes
- Division: Polypodiophyta
- Class: Polypodiopsida
- Order: Polypodiales
- Suborder: Polypodiineae
- Family: Davalliaceae
- Genus: Davallia
- Species: D. canariensis

Binomial name
- Davallia canariensis (L.) Sm.

= Davallia canariensis =

Species of fern

Davallia canariensis, the hare's-foot fern, is a species of fern in the family Davalliaceae. It is endemic to Macaronesia and the Iberian Peninsula. It grows well in a sunny atmosphere and amongst rocks.

== Description ==
Davallia canariensis is a spreading, deciduous fern with thick, scaly rhizomes and broad, finely-divided fronds, it grows up to 50 cm (20 in) tall and 100 cm (39 in) broad.

== Distribution and habitat ==
Davallia canariensis is found on the western Mediterranean Basin, from Cape Verde, the Canary Islands and Madeira to Morocco and the western Iberian Peninsula (western Portugal and northwest and southwest Spain). It grows on tree trunks and branches, mossy siliceous rocks in cool and humid places with oceanic influences, from sea-level to 600 m (2,000 ft) in altitude. The Latin specific epithet canariensis means "from the Canary Islands".

As it is only hardy down to 5 °C (41 °F), in temperate climates it must be grown as a houseplant. However, it may be placed outside in a sheltered spot during the summer months. It has an Award of Garden Merit from the Royal Horticultural Society.

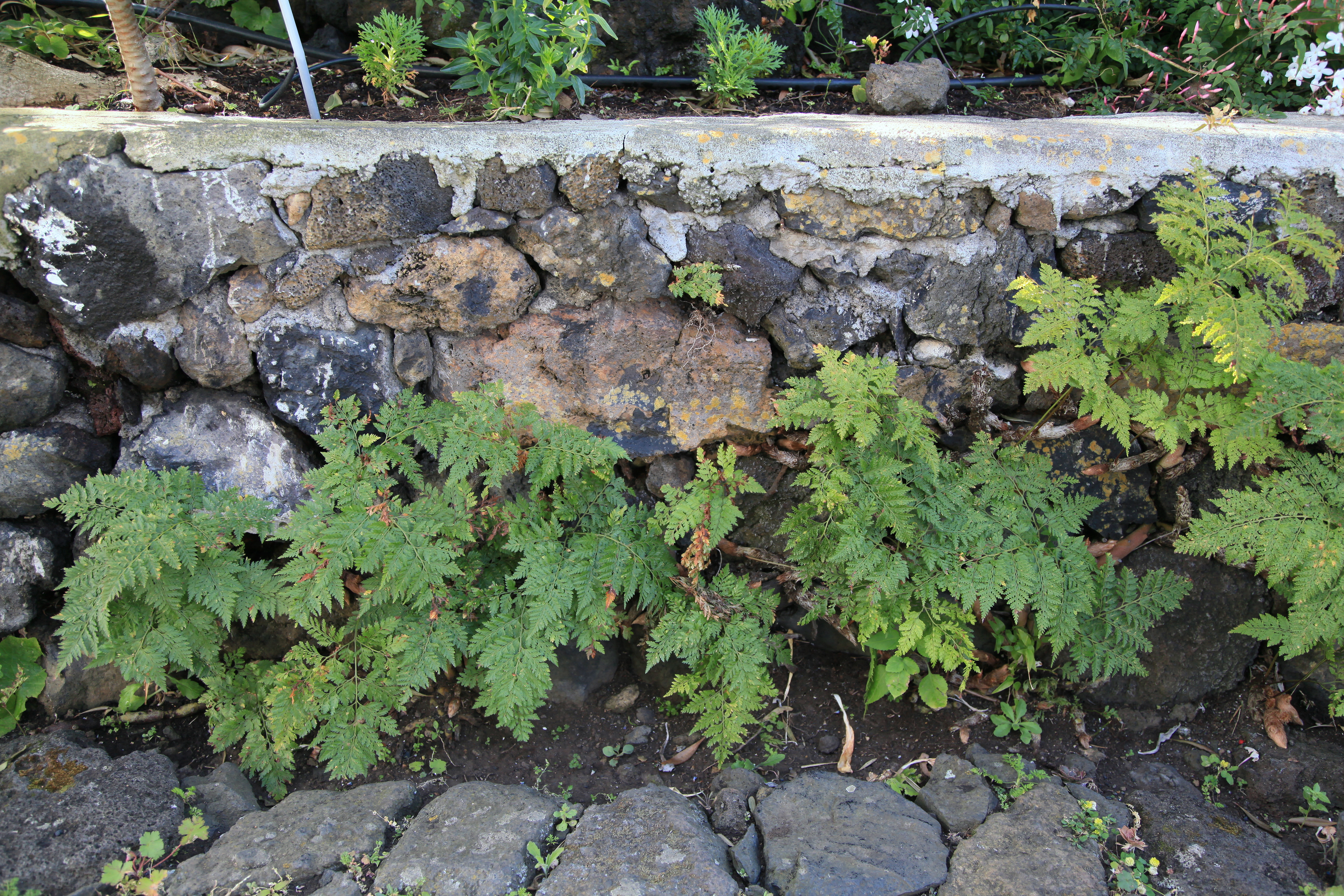

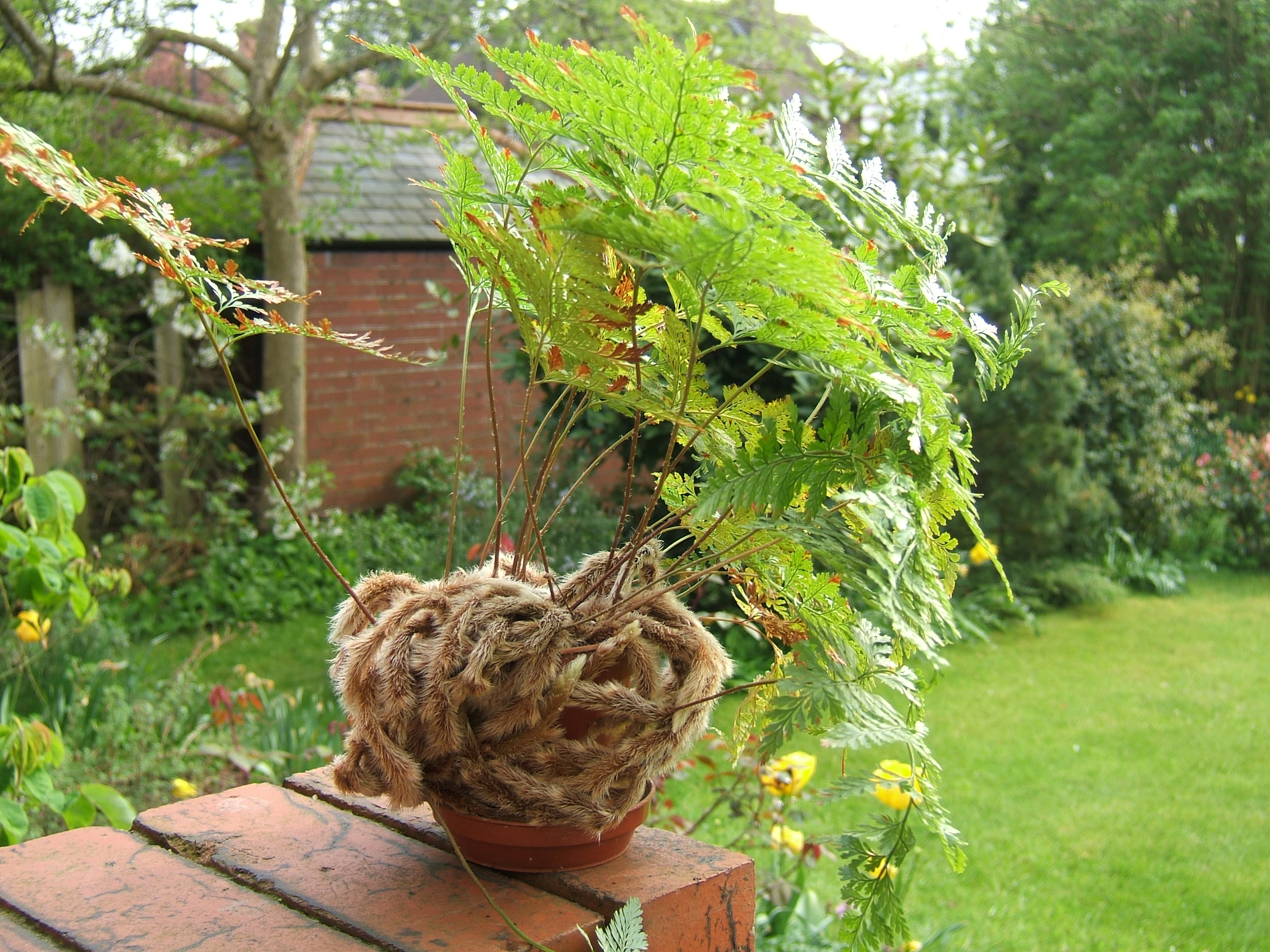

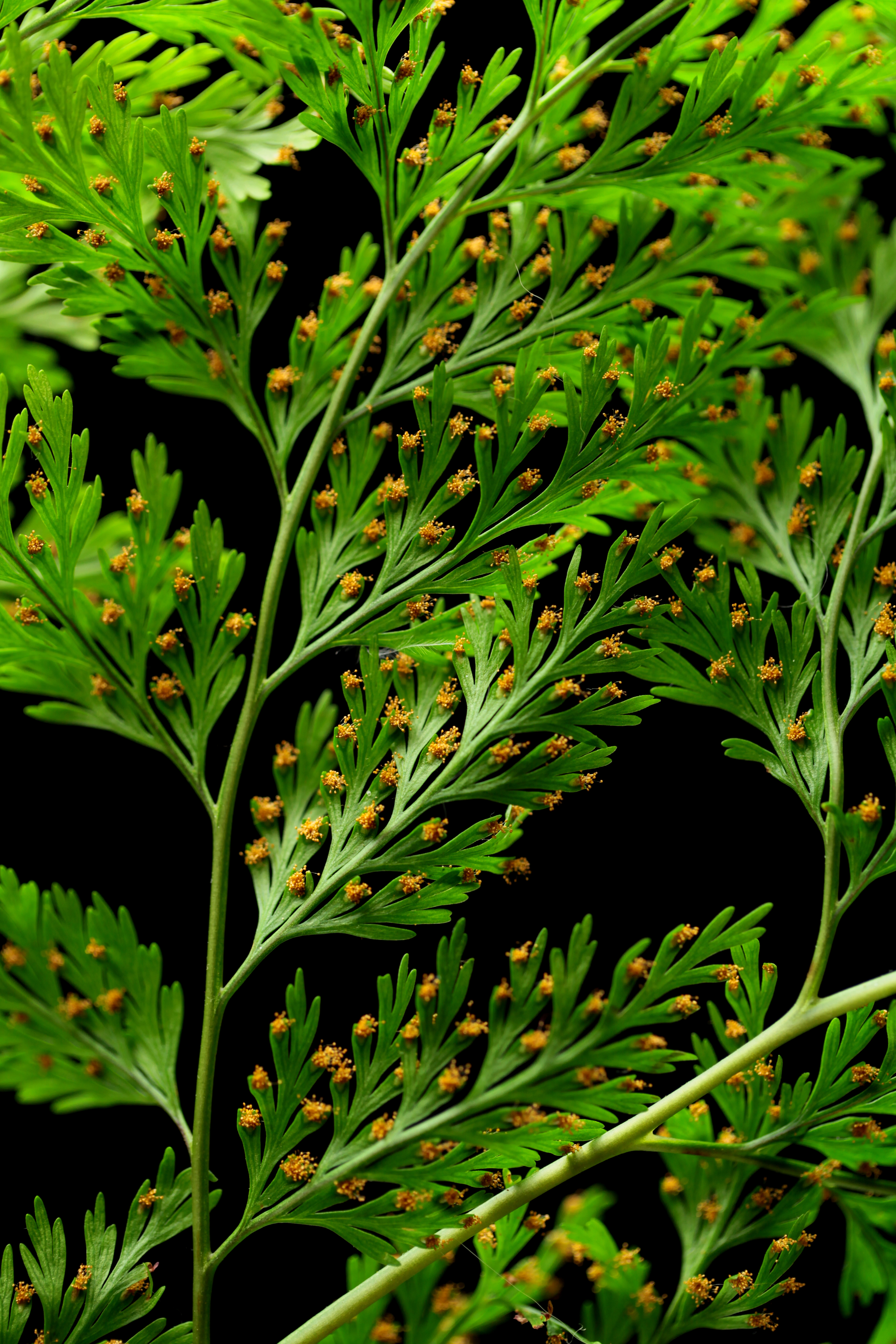

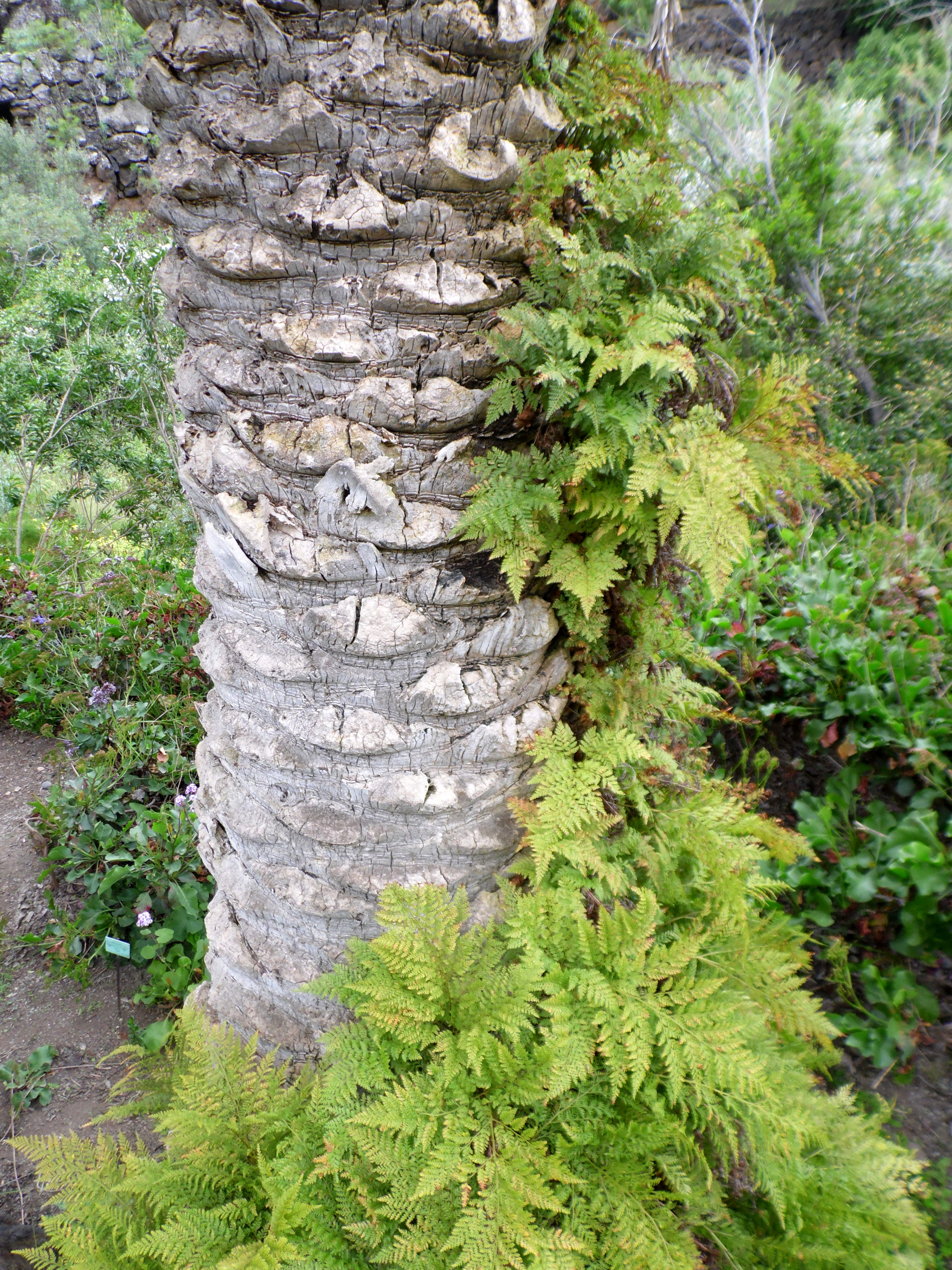
