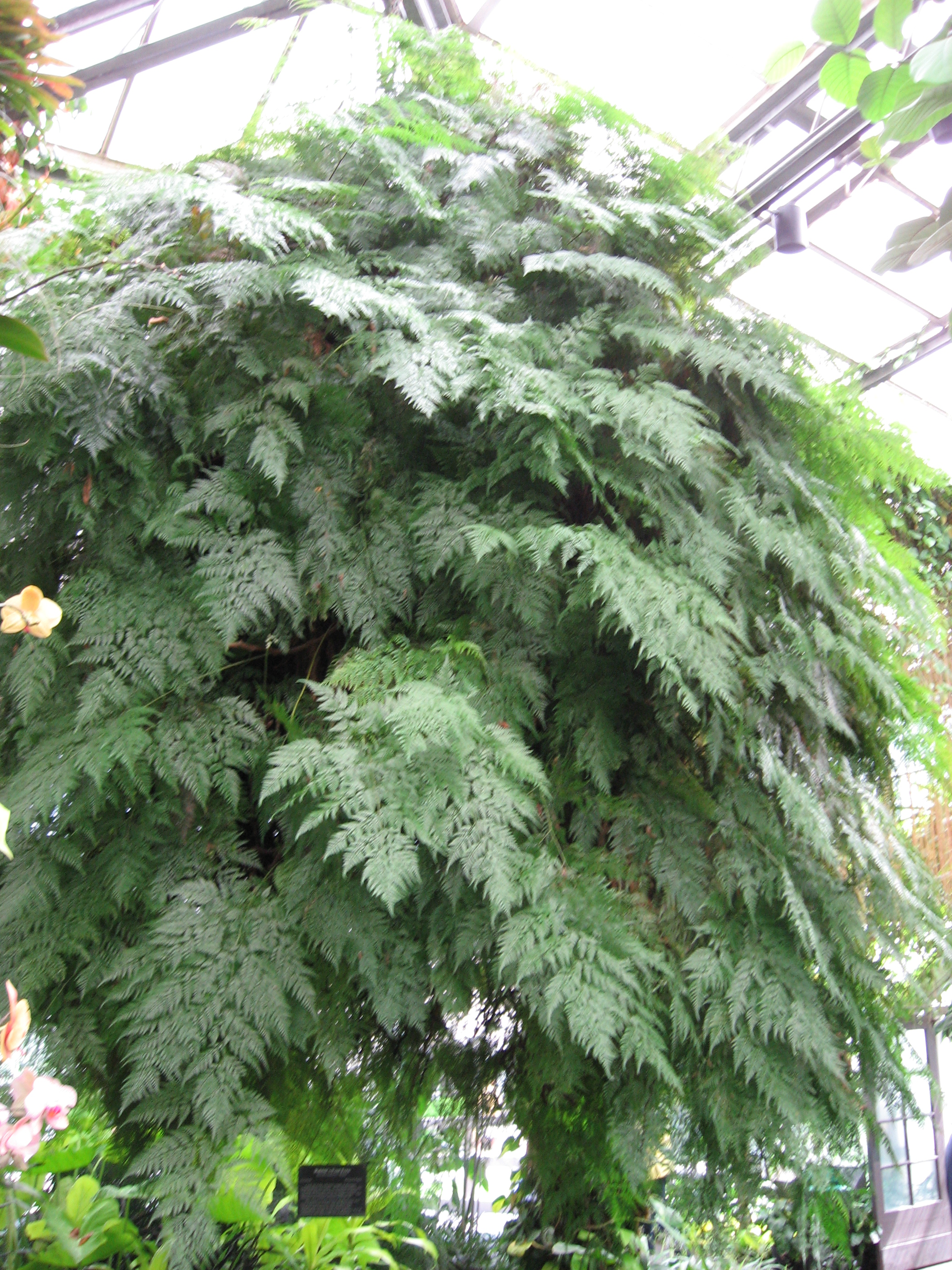
- Davallia fejeensis 'Major'

Scientific classification
- Kingdom: Plantae
- Clade: Tracheophytes
- Division: Polypodiophyta
- Class: Polypodiopsida
- Order: Polypodiales
- Suborder: Polypodiineae
- Family: Davalliaceae
- Genus: Davallia
- Species: D. fejeensis

Binomial name
- Davallia fejeensis Hook.

Synonyms
- Davallia solida var. fejeensis (Hook.) Noot.; Odontoloma fejeensis (Hook.) J.Sm.

= Davallia fejeensis =

Species of fern

Davallia fejeensis, or Davallia solida var. fejeensis, is a species of epiphytic fern in the family Davalliaceae, commonly referred to as rabbit's foot fern. The ferns are best known for their furry, brown and yellow rhizomes, which resemble rabbit's feet.

It is native to the Fiji Islands in Oceania. They survive from approximately 60–75 °F (16–24 °C) and cannot survive below 55 °F (13 °C). Their fronds can grow up to 2 feet (61 centimeters) in height.

== See also ==
- Phlebodium aureum, sometimes also referred to as hare-foot fern.
