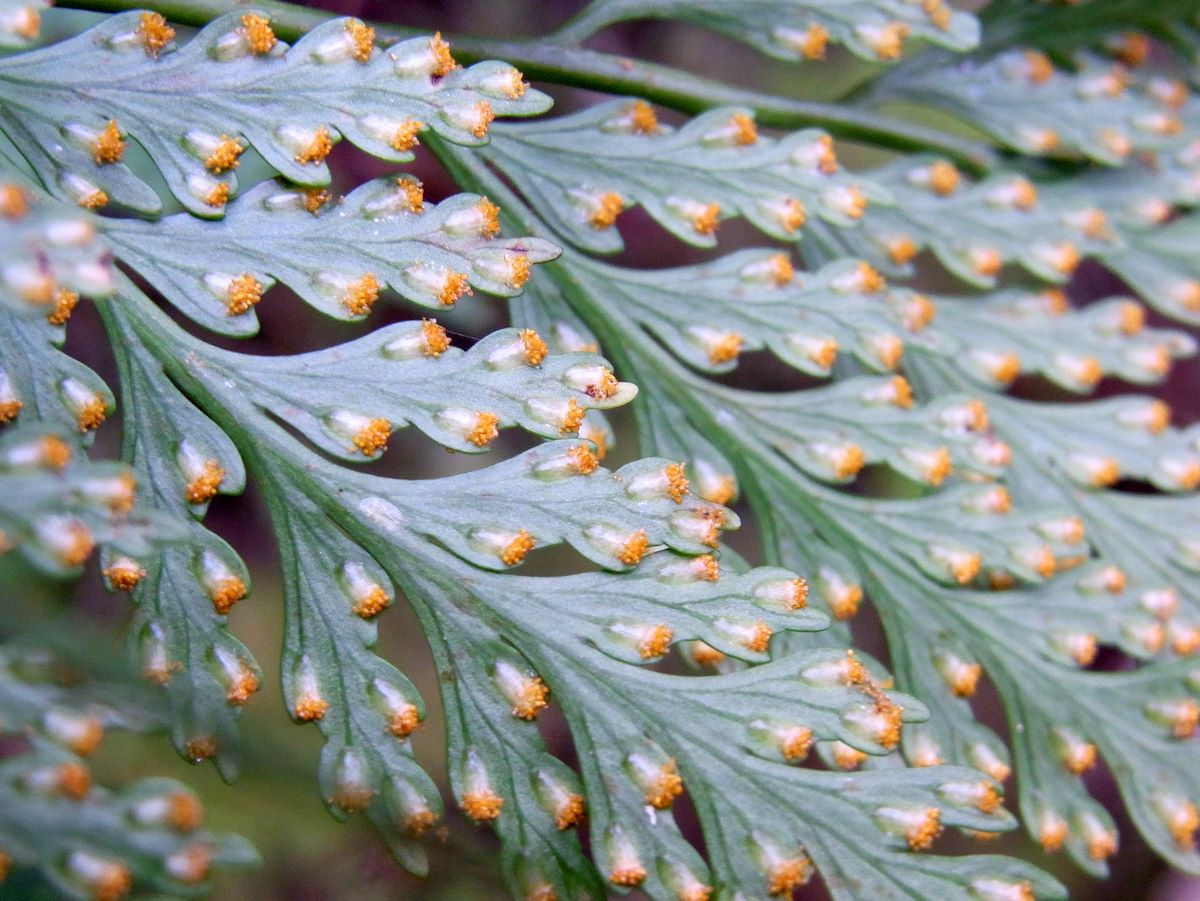

Scientific classification
- Kingdom: Plantae
- Clade: Tracheophytes
- Division: Polypodiophyta
- Class: Polypodiopsida
- Order: Polypodiales
- Suborder: Polypodiineae
- Family: Davalliaceae
- Genus: Davallia
- Species: D. solida
- Variety: D. s. var. pyxidata

Trinomial name
- Davallia solida var. pyxidata (Cav.) Noot.

Synonyms
- Davallia pyxidata Cav.

= Davallia solida var. pyxidata =

Variety of fern

Davallia solida var. pyxidata known as the hare's foot fern, is a variety of fern that occurs in eastern Australia and is usually identified as a lithophyte or epiphyte in or near rainforest areas. However, it may also be seen in a few locations west of the Great Dividing Range. Listed as vulnerable in Victoria, occurring in the Grampians.

Most often seen growing from cracks in rocks. But it can also be seen growing in "baskets" formed by other epiphytic ferns such as those in the genera Platycerium and Asplenium. The name "hare's foot" comes from the furry exposed rhizomes. The former specific epithet pyxidata is from Greek, and it refers to a "box", as the sori are partially encased by the frond.
