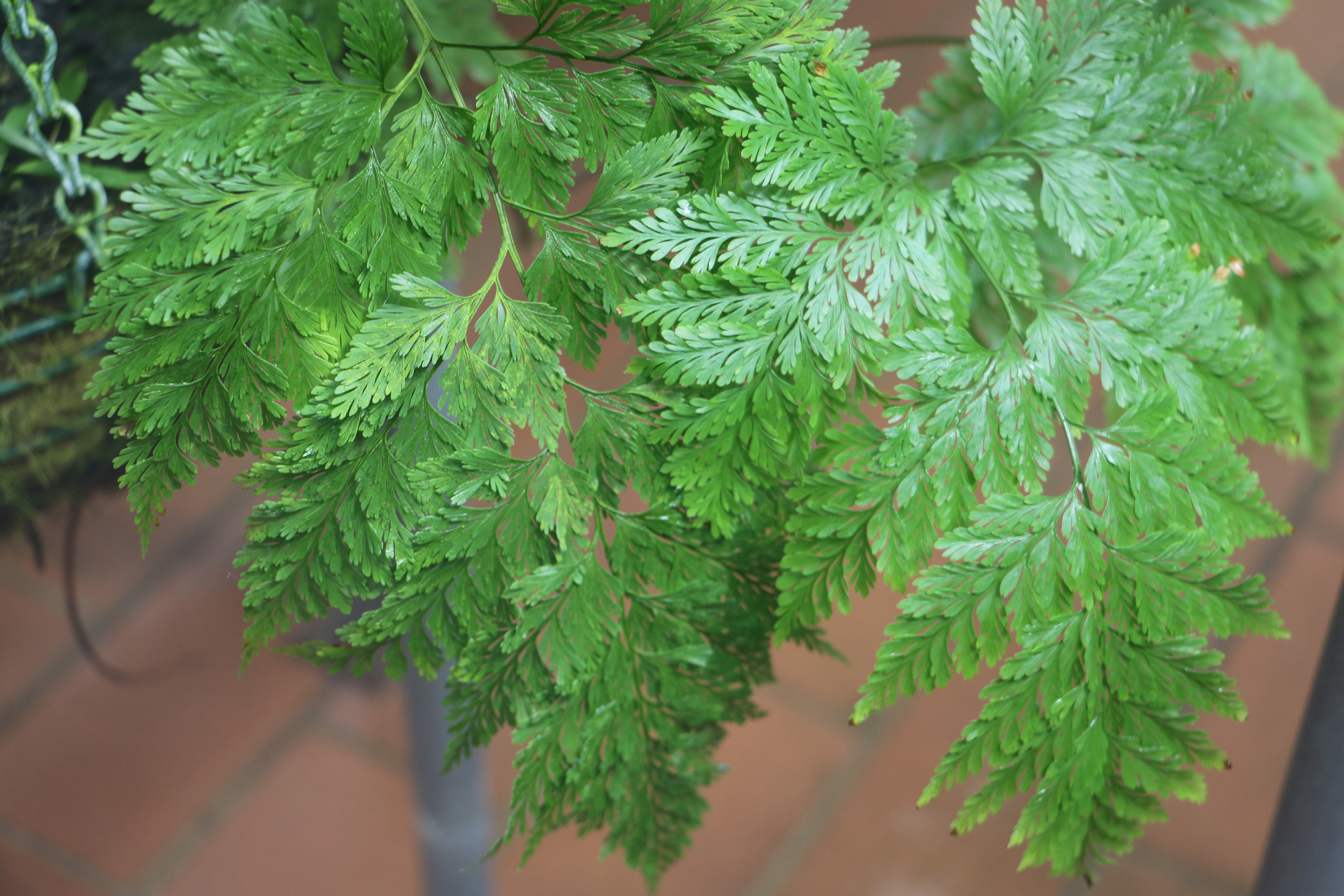

Scientific classification
- Kingdom: Plantae
- Clade: Tracheophytes
- Division: Polypodiophyta
- Class: Polypodiopsida
- Order: Polypodiales
- Suborder: Polypodiineae
- Family: Davalliaceae
- Genus: Davallia
- Species: D. denticulata

Binomial name
- Davallia denticulata (Burm. f.) Mett.

Synonyms
- Adiantum denticulatum Burm.f.; Trichomanes denticulatum (Burm.f.) Houtt.; Davallia elegans Sw.; Davallia patens Sw.; Trichomanes elegans (Sw.) Poir.; Davallia bidentata Schkuhr; Humata elegans (Sw.) Desv.; Humata patens (Sw.) Desv.; Davallia coniifolia Wall.; Davallia caudata Wall.; Leucostegia chaerophylla J.Sm.; Trichomanes lucidum Roxb.; Davallia elegans var. bidentata (Schkuhr) Hook.; Davallia elegans var. coniifolia Hook.; Davallia elegans var. edentula Hook.; Davallia elegans var. pulchra Hook.; Davallia elegans var. subunidentata Hook.; Davallia attenuata Lodd.; Parestia elegans (Sw.) C.Presl; Davallia elegans var. polydactyla T.Moore; Davallia impressa Copel.; Davallia brevisora Ching; Wibelia denticulata (Burm.f.) M.Kato & Tsutsumi

= Davallia denticulata =

Species of fern

Davallia denticulata is a widespread species of fern. Often seen as a lithophyte or epiphyte in different forest types. It may lose all its fronds in dry periods.
