= Davallia divaricata =

Scientific classification
- Kingdom: Plantae
- Clade: Tracheophytes
- Division: Polypodiophyta
- Class: Polypodiopsida
- Order: Polypodiales
- Suborder: Polypodiineae
- Family: Davalliaceae
- Genus: Davallia
- Species: D. divaricata

Binomial name
- Davallia divaricata Blume

Species of fern

Davallia divaricata is a fern in the genus Davallia of the family Davalliaceae.

It is native to tropical Southeast Asia and is used in traditional Chinese medicine, where it is known as gusuibu.

== Uses ==
Davallia divaricata produces davallic acid.
