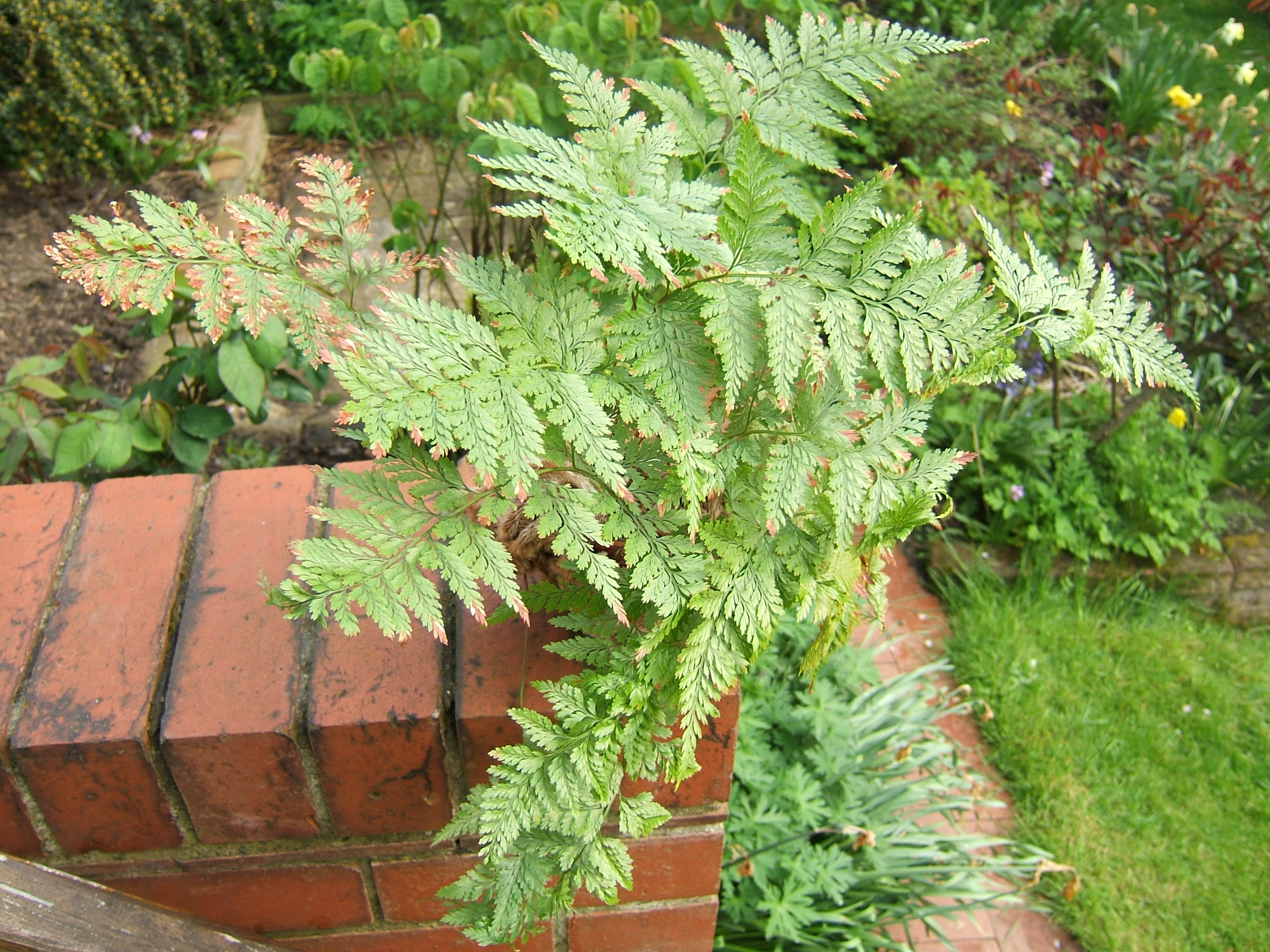
- Davallia canariensis in cultivation

Scientific classification
- Kingdom: Plantae
- Clade: Tracheophytes
- Division: Polypodiophyta
- Class: Polypodiopsida
- Order: Polypodiales
- Suborder: Polypodiineae
- Family: Davalliaceae; M.R.Schomb.
- Genus: Davallia (L.) Sm.

Type species
- Davallia canariensis (von Linné) Smith

Species
- See text

Synonyms
- Araiostegia Copel.; Araiostegiella M.Kato & Tsutsumi; Davallodes (Copel.) Copel.; Humata Cav.; Katoella Fraser-Jenkins; Pachypleuria (Presl) Presl; Paradavallodes Ching; Parasorus van Alderwerelt van Rosenburgh; Parestia Presl; Pteroneuron Fée; Scyphularia Fée; Stenolobus Presl; Trogostolon Copeland; Wibelia Bernh.

= Davallia =

Genus of ferns

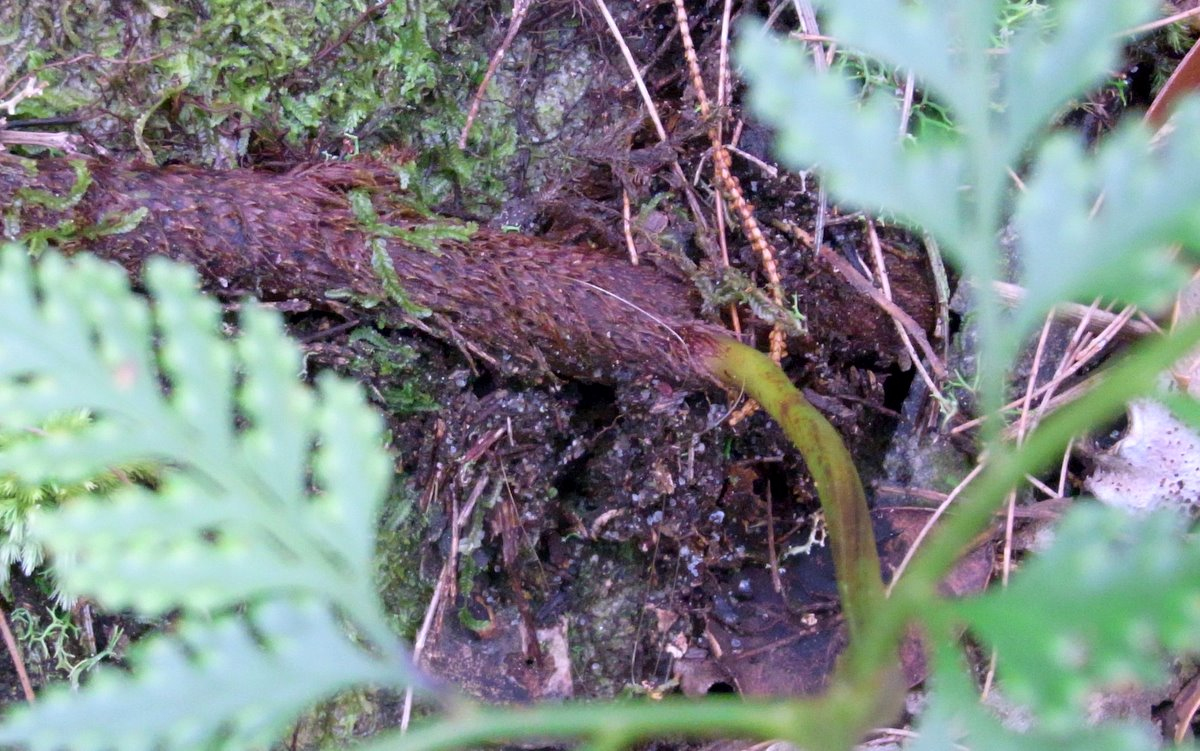
"Hare's Foot" on sandstone, Ku-ring-gai Chase National Park, Australia

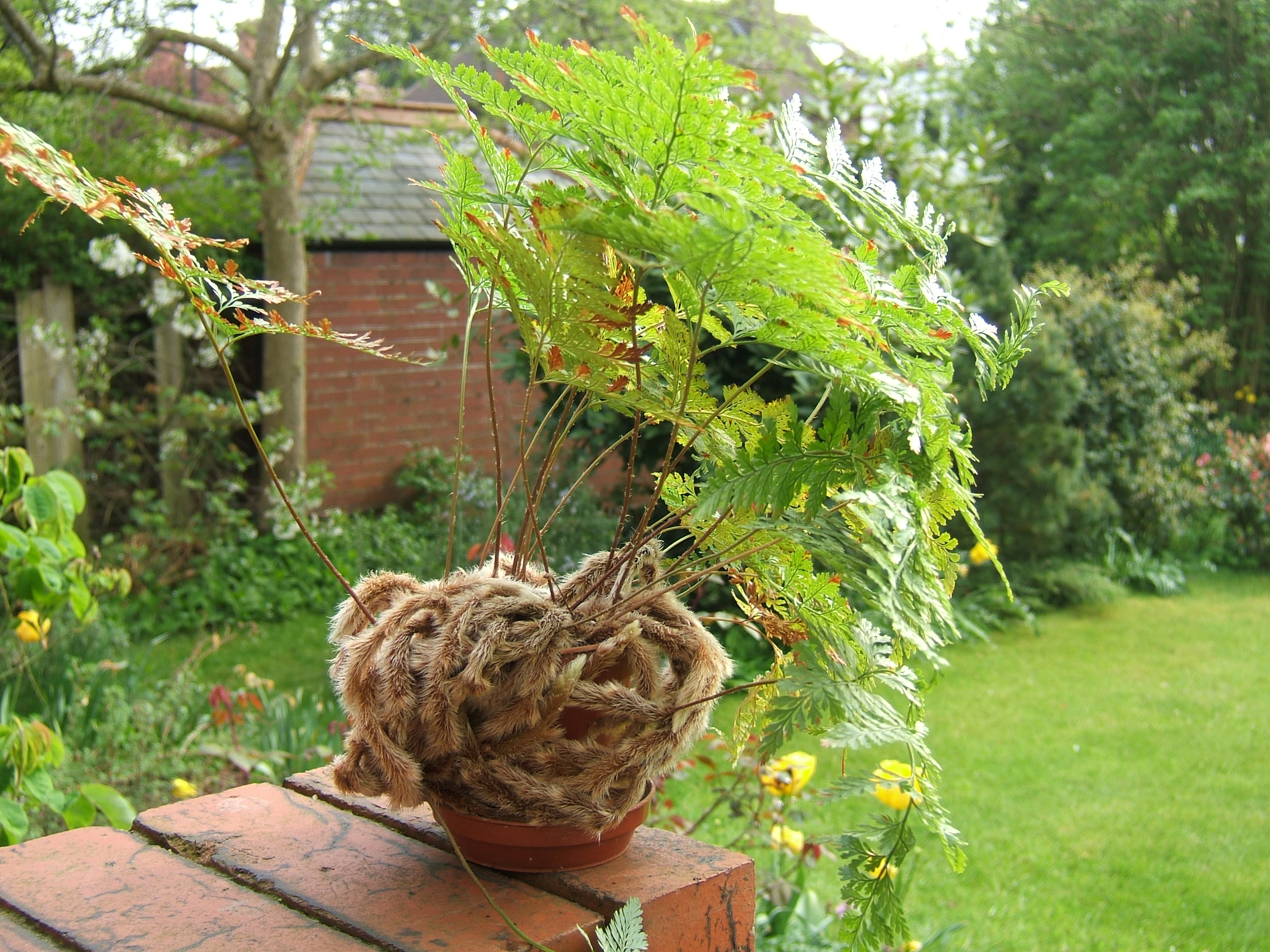
Davallia canariensis showing the rhizomes

Davallia (deersfoot fern, hare's foot fern, shinobu fern, rabbit foot fern, ball fern) is a genus of about 40 species of fern. In the Pteridophyte Phylogeny Group classification of 2016 (PPG I), it is the only genus in the family Davalliaceae, which is placed in the suborder Polypodiineae, order Polypodiales. Alternatively, the family may be placed in a very broadly defined family Polypodiaceae sensu lato as the subfamily Davallioideae.

The family is sister to the largest family of ferns, Polypodiaceae, and shares some morphological characters with it. Species are epiphytic ferns, with fronds arising from long aerial rhizomes which grow on and over thick bark on trees or on rock crevices.

== Description ==
Usually epiphytic or epipetric. Rhizomes dictyostelic, dorsiventral, densely scaly. Stipes articulate at base. Phyllopodia short. veins free. Sporangium stalk 3-rowed. Annulus vertical. Spores monolete.

== Taxonomy ==
Gymnogrammitis and Leucostegia were once included in Davalliaceae, but these are now known to belong elsewhere. Gymnogrammitis is in a clade with Selliguea and others in the family Polypodiaceae. Leucostegia is in the family Hypodematiaceae, which consists of Hypodematium and Leucostegia, and possibly Didymochlaena as well.

In 2008, a molecular phylogenetic study of Davalliaceae showed that none of the polyspecific genera recognized at that time were monophyletic. In that same year, a revision of the family divided it into five genera. One of these, Araiostegiella, was newly described. The genus Davallia was divided into two sections, named Davallia and Trogostolon. Based on molecular phylogenetic studies, the Pteridophyte Phylogeny Group classification of 2016 (PPG I) accepts only one genus in the family, Davallia, sinking the other genera into synonymy. The study on which the PPG I circumscription is based divides the genus into seven sections.

=== Phylogeny ===
The following cladogram for the suborder Polypodiineae (eupolypods I), based on the consensus cladogram in the Pteridophyte Phylogeny Group classification of 2016 (PPG I), shows a likely phylogenetic relationship between Davalliaceae and the other families of the clade.

External phylogeny

- Polypodiineae (eupolypods I)
  - Didymochlaenaceae
  - - Hypodematiaceae
    - - Dryopteridaceae
      - - - Nephrolepidaceae
          - Lomariopsidaceae
        - - Tectariaceae
          - - Oleandraceae
            - - Davalliaceae
              - Polypodiaceae

Internal phylogeny

- Davallia
  - - section Davallodes
      - D. pubescens Chen 2017
      - - - Paradavallodes kansuensis Ching 1966
          - D. membranulosa Wallich 1828 ex Hooker 1846
        - - D. multidentata Wallich ex Hooker & Baker 1867
          - - D. borneensis (Hooker) Smith 1869
            - - D. hymenophylloides (Blume) Kuhn 1869
              - D. pulchra Don 1825
  - - - section Davallia
        D. canariensis (von Linné) Smith 1793
    - - - section Cordisquama
          - D. divaricata Blume 1828
          - - D. embolostegia Copeland 1906
            - - D. chaerophylloides (Poiret) Steud. 1824
              - - D. denticulata (Burman) Mettenius ex Kuhn 1867
                - D. epiphylla (Forster) Sprengel 1799
      - - - section Araiostegiella
            - D. hookeri (Beddome) Zhang 2012
            - - D. perdurans Christ 1898
              - Araiostegiella faberiana (Christensen) Kato & Tsutsumi 2008
        - - - section Humata
              - - D. polypodioides
                - - D. heterophylla Smith 1793
                  - D. sessilifolia Blume 1828
              - - D. corniculata Moore 1861
                - - - D. chrysanthemifolia Hayata 1915
                    - - D. parvula Wallich ex Hooker & Greville 1829
                      - D. pusilla Mettenius 1861
                  - - D. pectinata Smith 1793
                    - - D. angustata Wallich 1828 ex Hooker & Greville 1831
                      - - D. cumingii Hooker 1846
                        - D. repens (von Linné) Kuhn 1867
          - - section Trogostolon
              - D. beddomei Hope 1899
              - - - D. platylepis Baker 1898
                  - - D. griffithiana Hooker 1846
                    - D. tyermanii (Moore) Veitch 1873
                - - D. assamica (Beddome) Baker 1868
                  - - D. trichomanoides Blume 1828
                    - - D. bullata Wallich 1828 ex Hooker 1846
                      - D. yunnanensis Christ 1898
            - section Scyphularia
              - D. tasmanii Field 1890
              - - D. pentaphylla Blume 1828
                - - D. triphylla Hooker 1846
                  - - D. sinensis (Christ) Ching 1931
                    - - D. pyxidata Cavanilles 1802
                      - - D. fejeensis Hooker 1846
                        - D. solida (Forster) Swartz 1801

Other species include:

- †Davallia aspera Botscharnikova 1960
- Davallia brevipes Copeland 1906
- †Davallia bullatiformis Chlonova 1960
- †Davallia cavernosa Botscharnikova 1960
- Davallia dimorpha (Copeland) Holttum 1937
- †Davallia haidingeri von Ettingshausen 1858
- Davallia kinabaluensis (Copeland) Chen 2017
- Davallia leptocarpa Mettenius ex Kuhn 1869
- †Davallia mantellii (Brongniart 1828) de Saporta 1891
- †Davallia montana Knowlton 1899
- Davallia napoensis Wang & Xing 2011
- Davallia pusilloides (Copeland) Parris 2018
- Davallia rouffaeriensis Nooteboom 1994
- Davallia seramensis Kato 1989
- Davallia serrata Willdenow 1810
- Davallia sessilifolioides Kato 1989
- †Davallia solidites Graham 1963
- Davallia speciosa Mettenius ex Kuhn 1869
- Davallia subvestita (Christensen) Parris 2018
- Davallia wagneriana Copeland 1905

=== Selected species ===
Many of the species of Davallia are closely related and hard to distinguish from each other. In 1990, a treatment of Davalliaceae estimated the number of species at 110. A 2008 paper listed all of the species, recognizing only 63. A new species, Davallia napoensis was described in 2011. The Pteridophyte Phylogeny Group classification of 2016 (PPG I) suggests there are about 65 species.

- Davallia bullata - Japan, China, and tropical Asia.
- Davallia canariensis - Macaronesia, Iberian Peninsula and Morocco.
- Davallia denticulata - Africa, India, China, Malesia, Indonesia, Polynesia, Australia
- Davallia divaricata (syn.: Davallia polyantha) - Tropical Asia.
- Davallia embolostegia
- Davallia fejeensis Hook (syn.: Davallia fijiensis) - Fiji Islands and Australia.
- Davallia mariesii or "Squirrel's-foot fern" – tropical Asia and Malaysia
- Davallia pectinata
- Davallia repens
- Davallia solida - Sri Lanka, tropical and subtropical Asia (east Himalaya to Southeast Asia and China), eastern Australia, and Pacific Islands
  - Davallia solida var. pyxidata - New South Wales
  - Davallia solida var. fejeensis (Hook.) Noot. - endemic to Fiji
  - Davallia solida var. solida
- Davallia tasmanii - Davallia fern, native to the Three Kings Islands.
- Davallia trichomanoides (syn.: Davallia dissecta) - Malaysia.

== Distribution and habitat ==
Davalliaceae is native to tropical and subtropical regions of the Pacific, Australia, Asia, and Africa. Plants are usually epiphytic, sometimes lithophytic or terrestrial.

== Davallia as house plants ==
Many species of Davallia are in cultivation, with Davallia tyermanii, Davallia fejeensis, and Davallia solida being perhaps the most well-known. A key to the cultivated species of Davallia is available. D. polypodiaceae, D. canariensis and D. trichomanoides are also grown as ornamental plants. D. fejeensis is the most common Davallia species in commerce, and D. canariensis is widely grown as a house plant.

The plants have furry rhizomes which cover the surface of the potting mixture as well as root down into it. The fronds are triangular in shape and about 1½ feet long by 1 foot wide. They divide into three to four pinnae which subdivide into many pinnules. Davallia are often used in hanging baskets because the rhizomes split into sections and the surface is covered quickly. Unlike other ferns, Davallia tolerate low levels of humidity.
