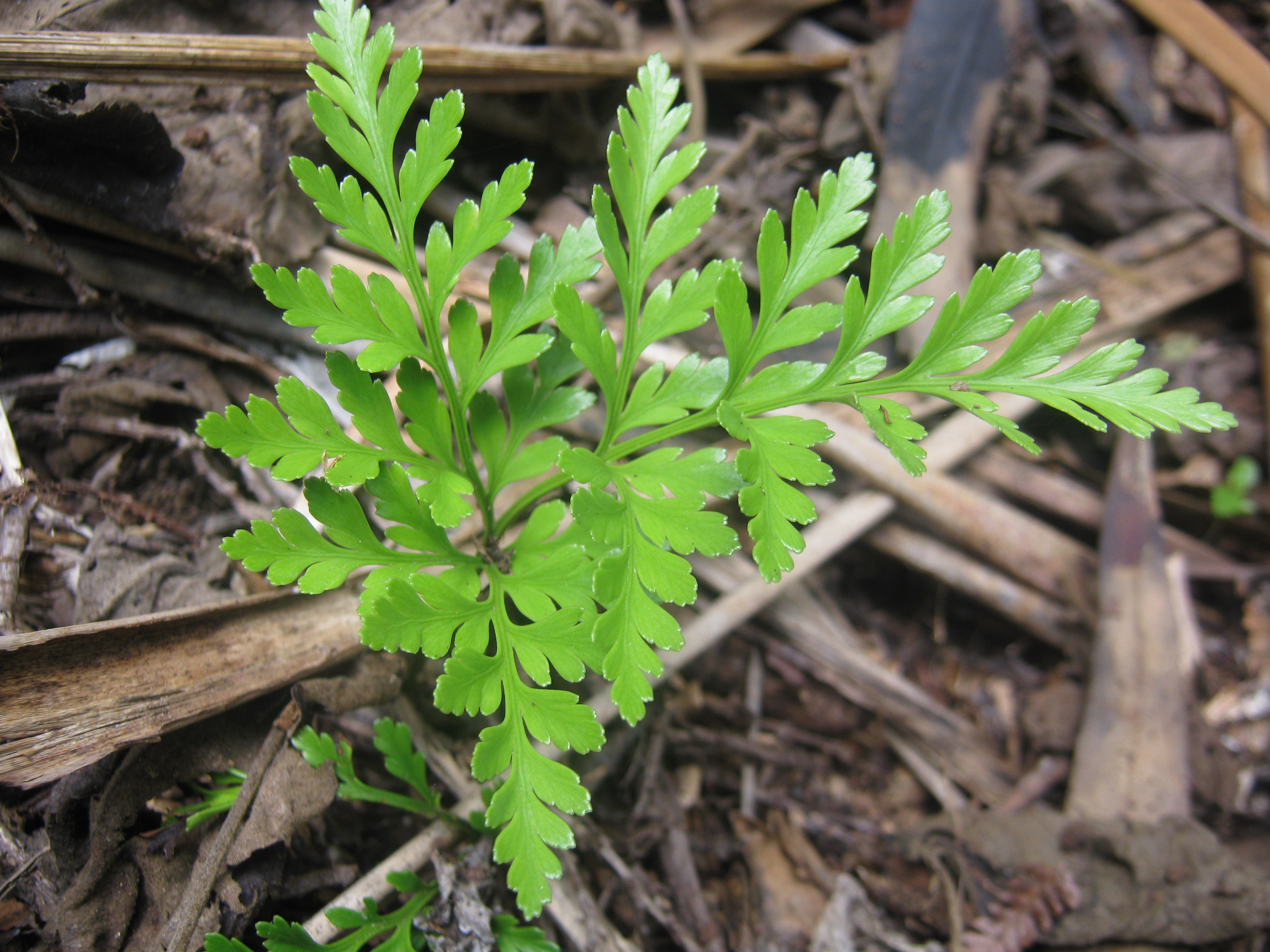

Scientific classification
- Kingdom: Plantae
- Clade: Tracheophytes
- Division: Polypodiophyta
- Class: Polypodiopsida
- Order: Polypodiales
- Suborder: Polypodiineae
- Family: Davalliaceae
- Genus: Davallia
- Species: D. tasmanii

Binomial name
- Davallia tasmanii Field, 1890

= Davallia tasmanii =

Species of fern

Davallia tasmanii is a fern in the family Davalliaceae found mainly in New Zealand (Three Kings Islands) and Tasmania. It grows well in dry place and the growth is very slow. It can grow from spores and rooted pieces.
