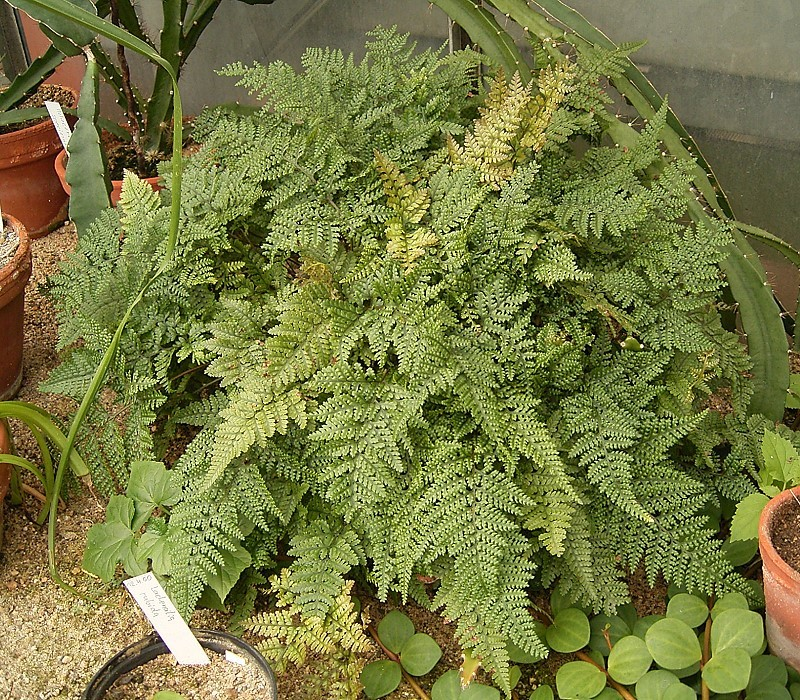
- Davallia bullata

Scientific classification
- Kingdom: Plantae
- Clade: Tracheophytes
- Division: Polypodiophyta
- Class: Polypodiopsida
- Order: Polypodiales
- Suborder: Polypodiineae
- Family: Davalliaceae
- Genus: Davallia
- Species: D. bullata

Binomial name
- Davallia bullata Wall. ex Hook.

= Davallia bullata =

Species of fern

Davallia bullata, the squirrel's-foot fern, is a fern in the family Davalliaceae found mainly in Japan and China. It grows well in shady places. It grows from 20 to 35 cm. It has deciduous bullata and its leaflets are linear.
