= Fern sports =

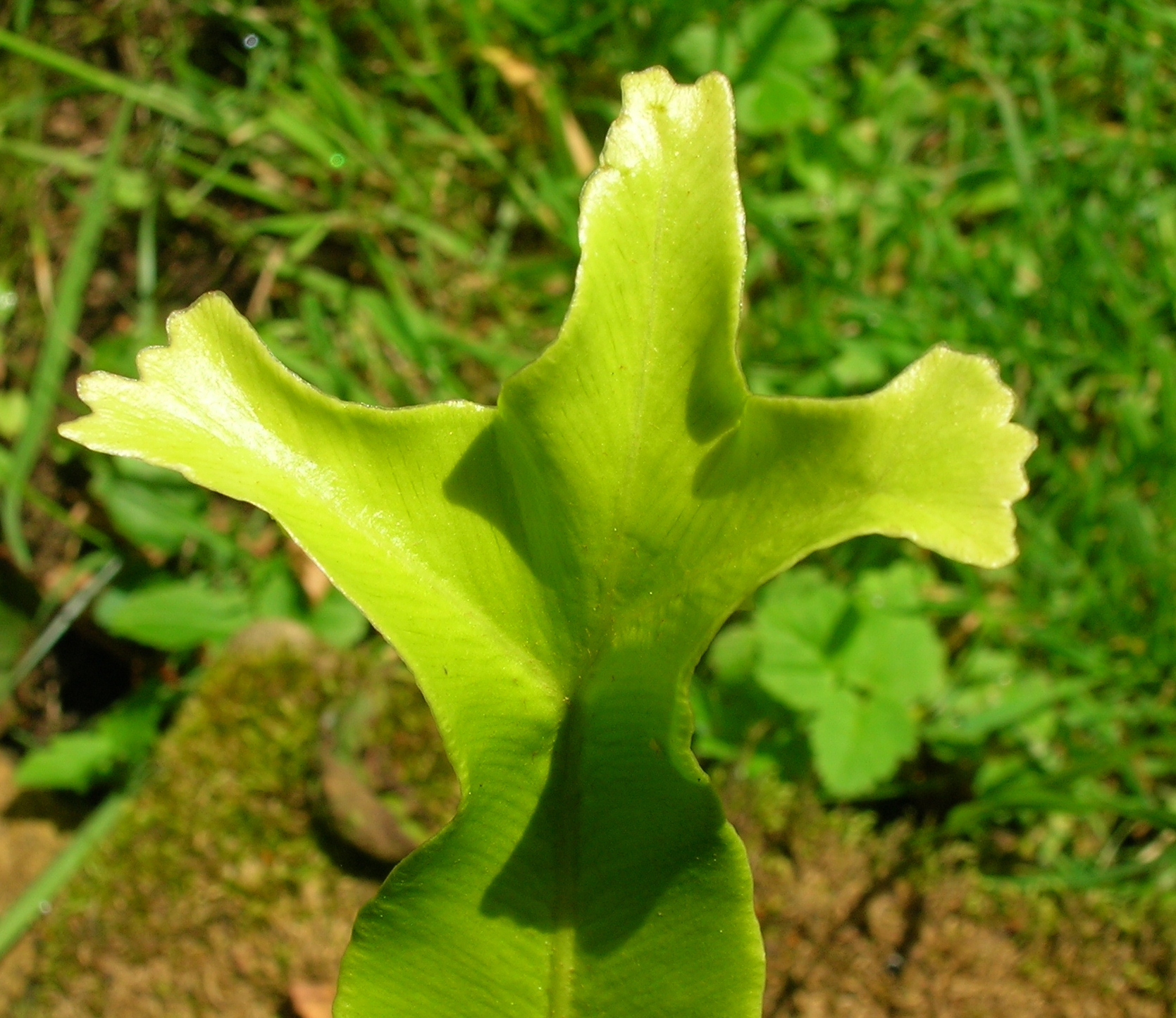
Hart's Tongue Fern sport

Fern sports are plants that show marked change from the normal type or parent stock as a result of mutation. The term Morphotype is also used for any of a group of different types of individuals of the same species in a population. Fern fronds in sports are typically altered in several ways, such as the frond apex divided and pinnae similarly duplicated.

== Occurrence ==
Soft Shield Fern Polystichum setiferum, Lady Fern Athyrium filix-femina and Hart's Tongue Fern Asplenium scolopendrium are known to have around three hundred varieties or sports. Scaly Male Fern Dryopteris affinis and Male Fern Dryopteris filix-mas have a number of commercially available and naturally occurring sports or subspecies. Examples are D. affinis polydactyla Dadds, A. filix-femina plumosum, A. filix-femina corymbiferum, and D. filix-mas Barnesii.

Lady Fern (Athyrium filix-femina)

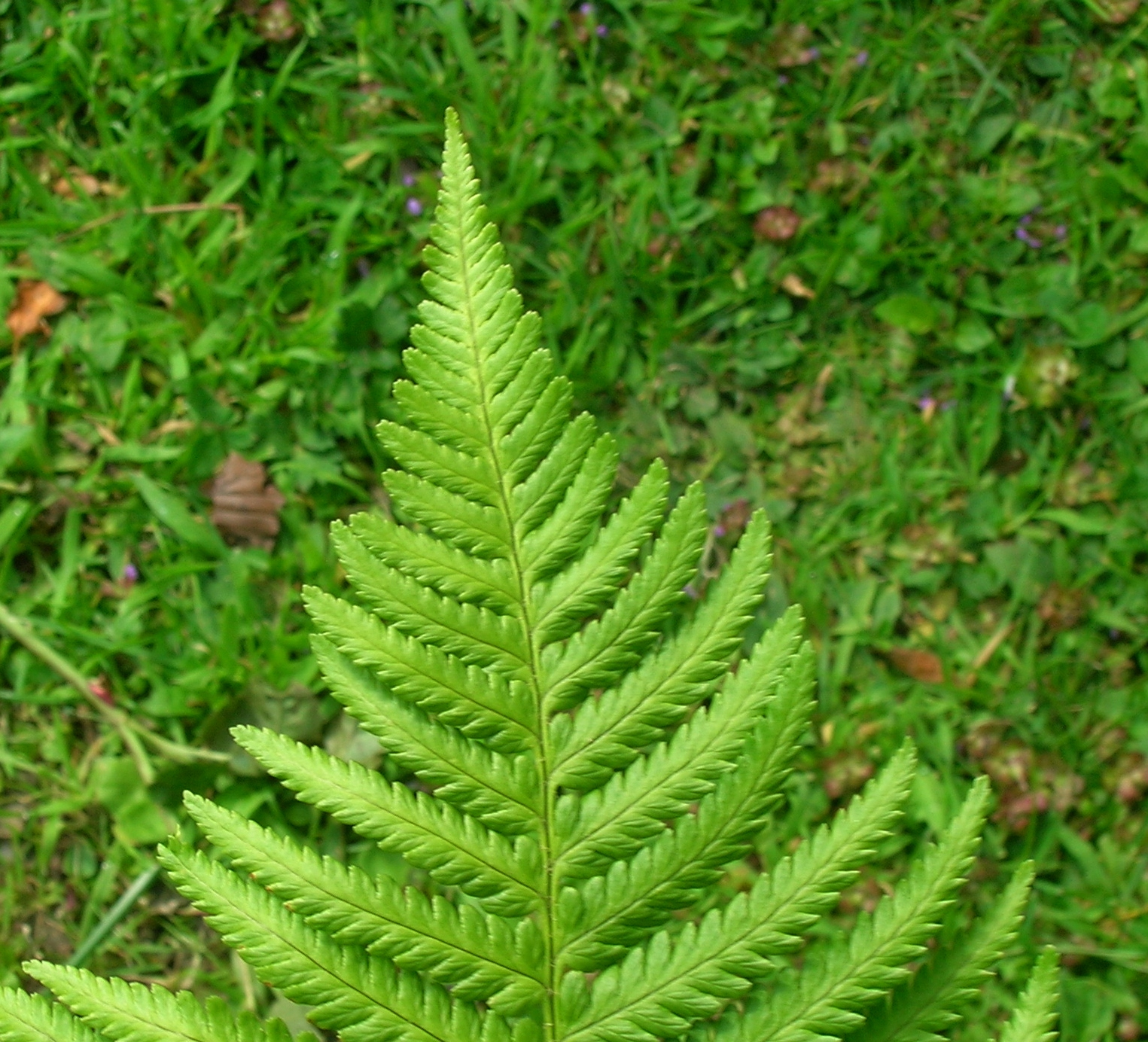
Normal Lady Fern frond appearance.

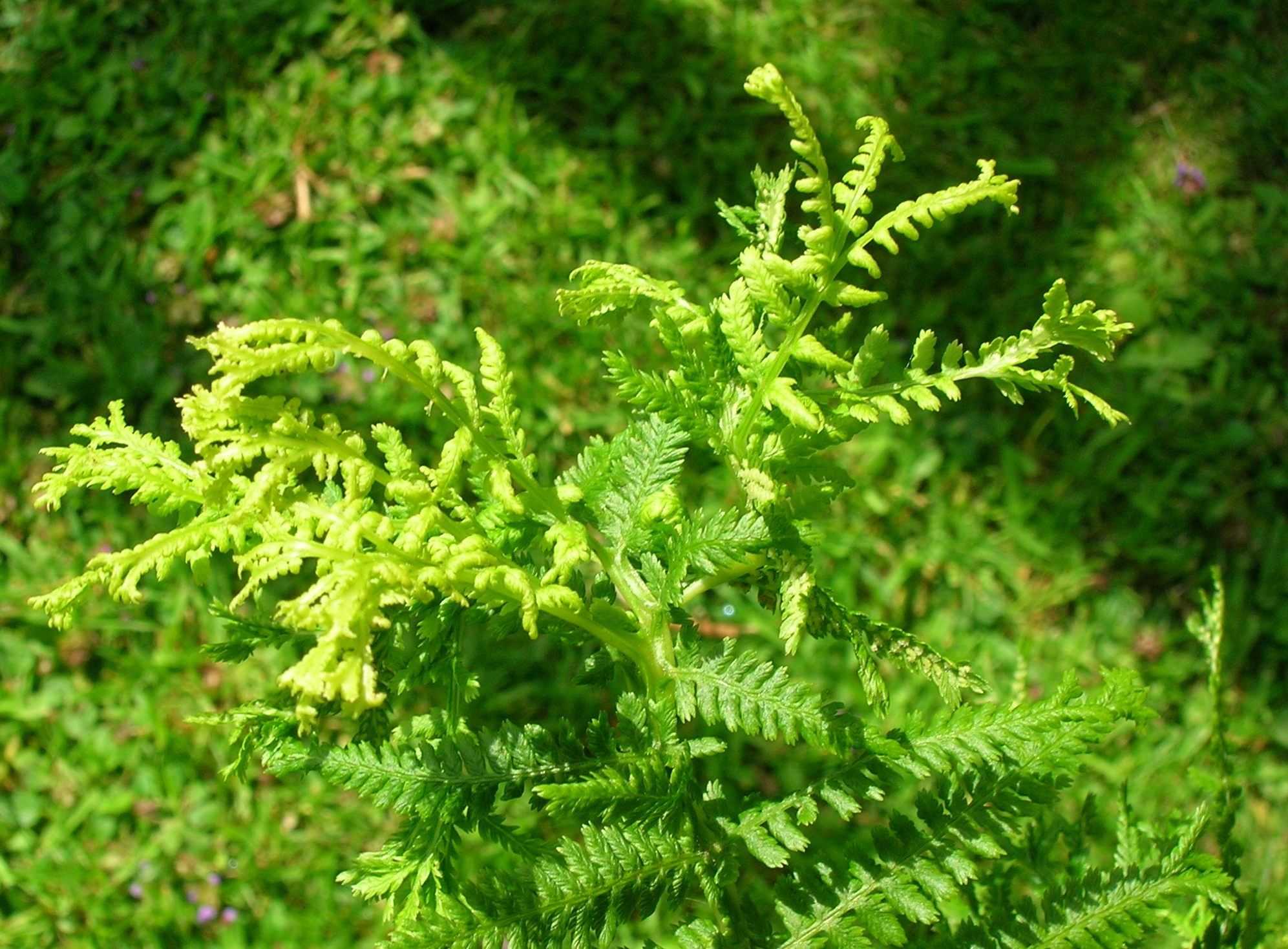
Lady Fern sport.

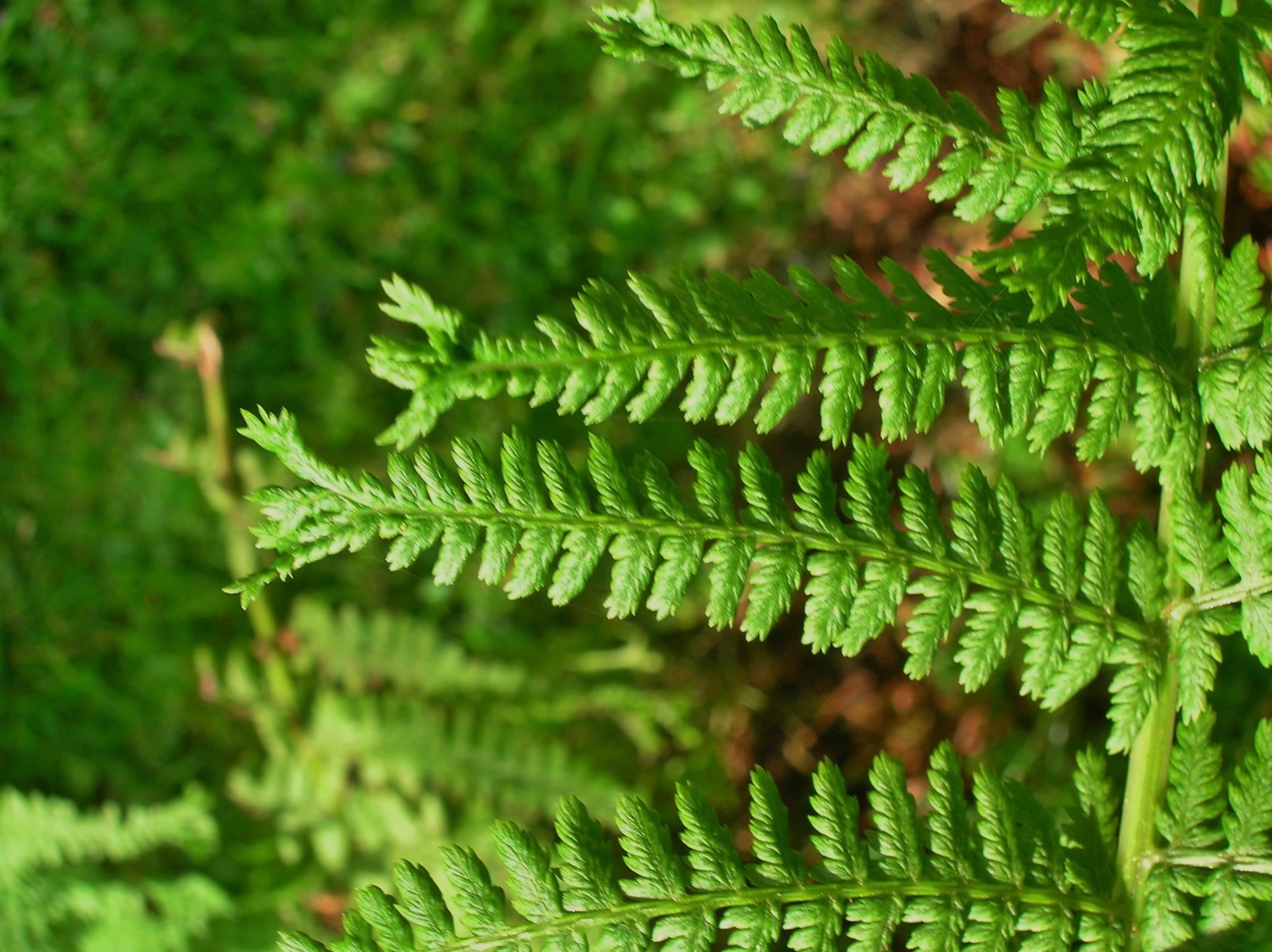
Lady Fern pinna showing abnormal tips.

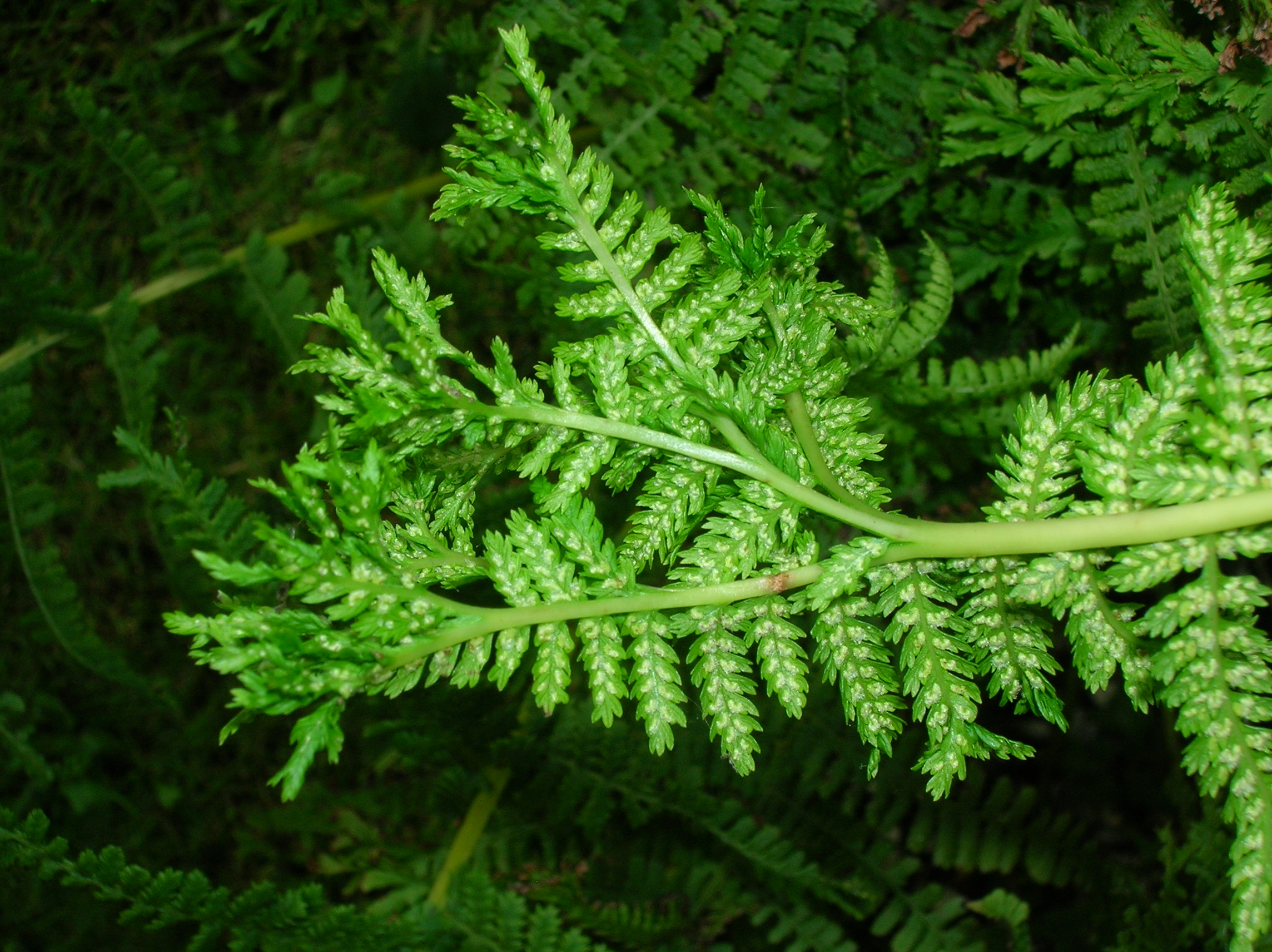
Lady Fern sport showing lower surface with normal sori.

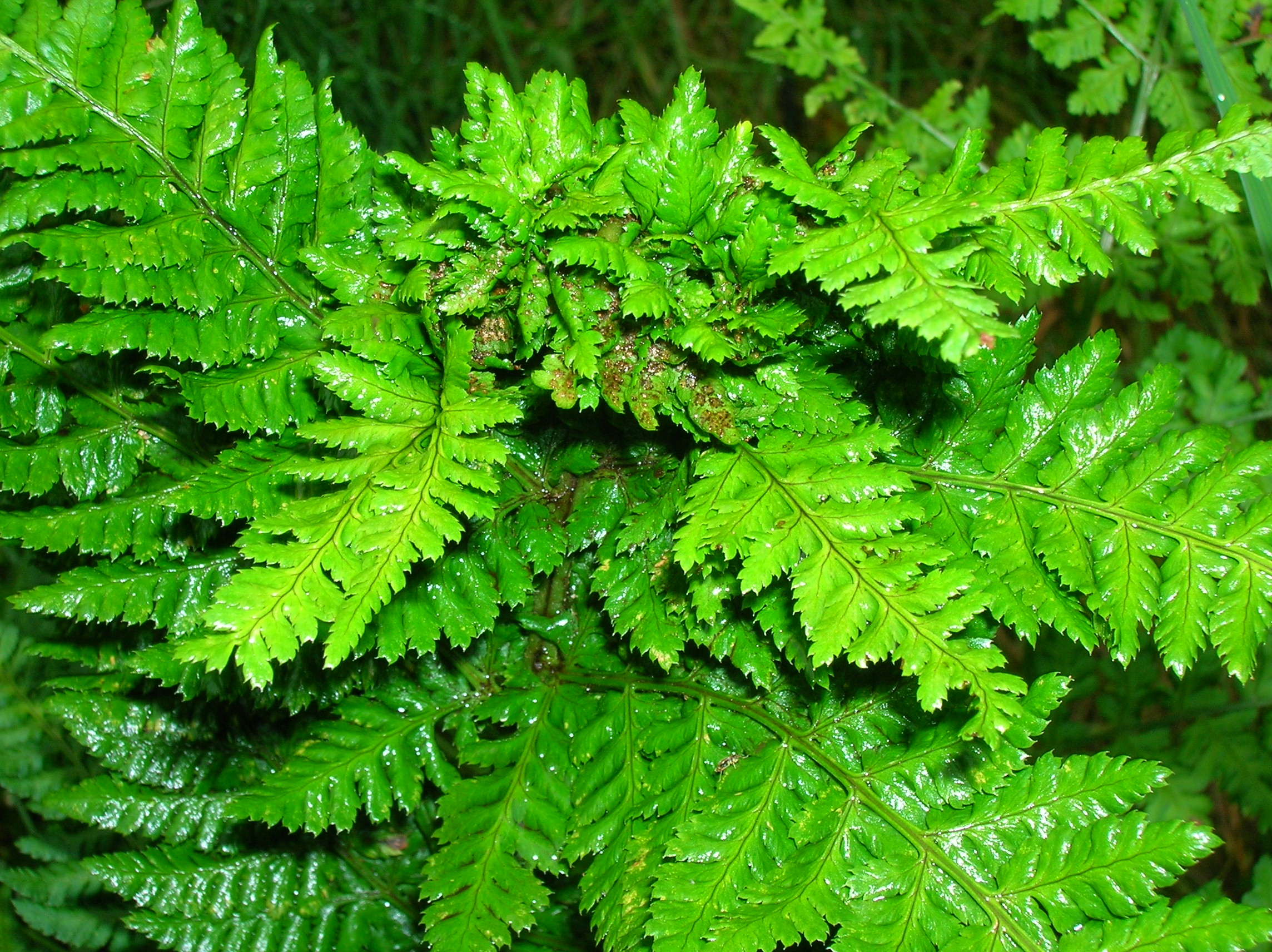
A Knotting gall on Broad buckler fern.

== Characteristics ==
The frond of a sport may be branched at the tip and at the tips of the pinnae, the colour may vary, and variegation may occur; fronds generally remain bilaterally symmetrical. Fern sports remain normal in certain respects, such as viability with sori and indusia appearing normal. The frond stipe may be a different colour.

Hart's Tongue fern (Asplenium scolopendrium)

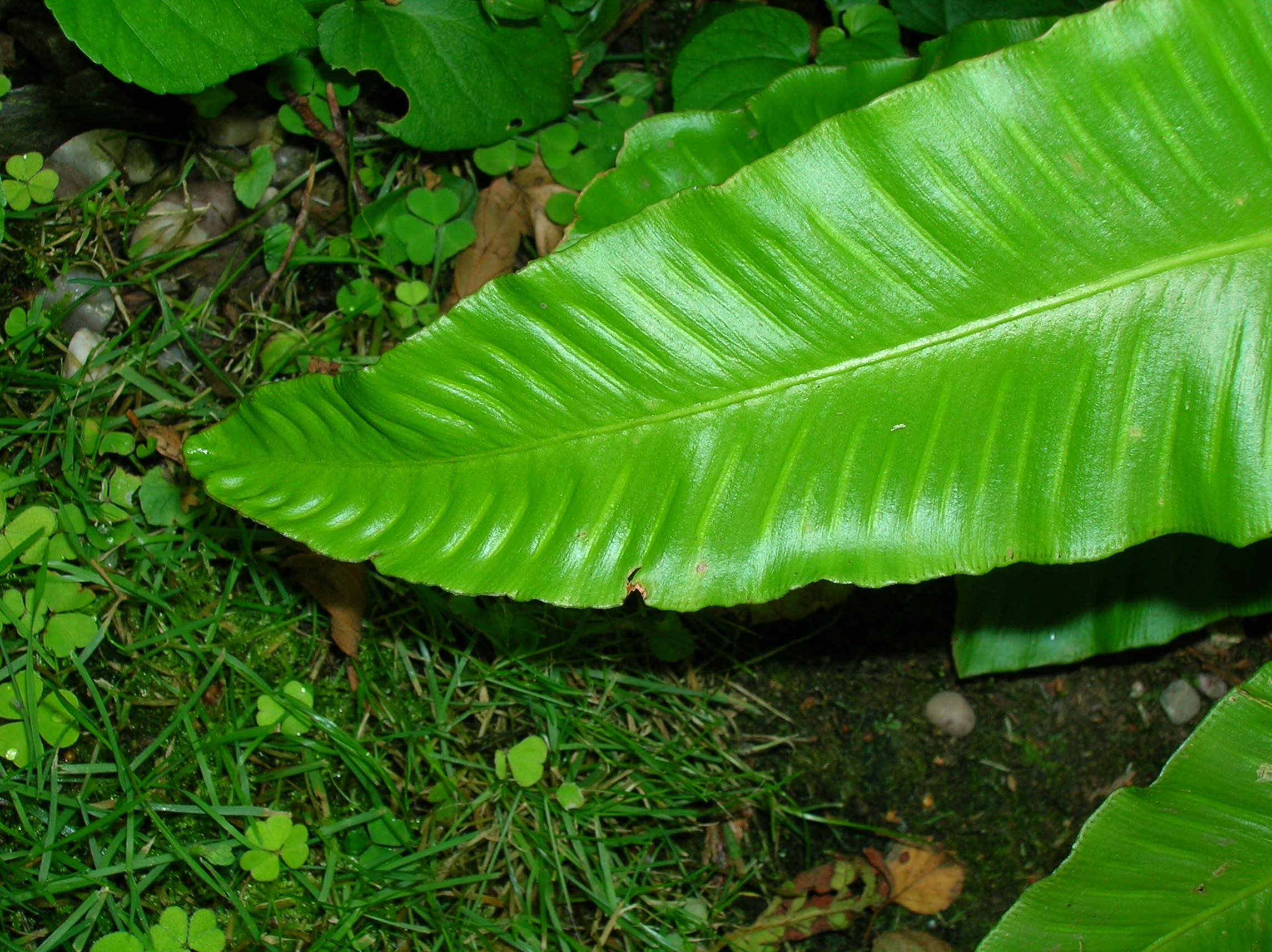
Normal frond.

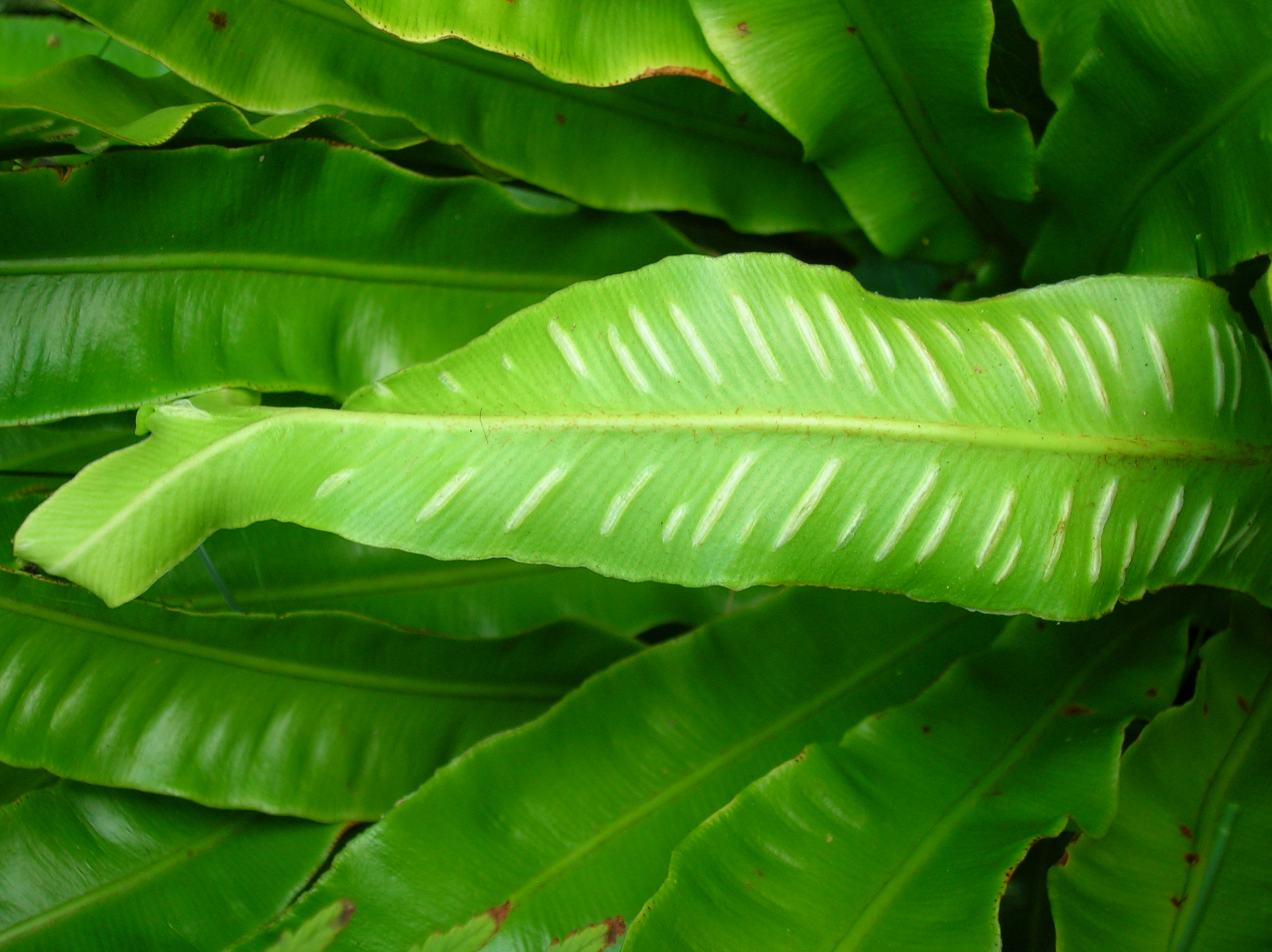
Underside of fern sport showing normal sori and indusia.

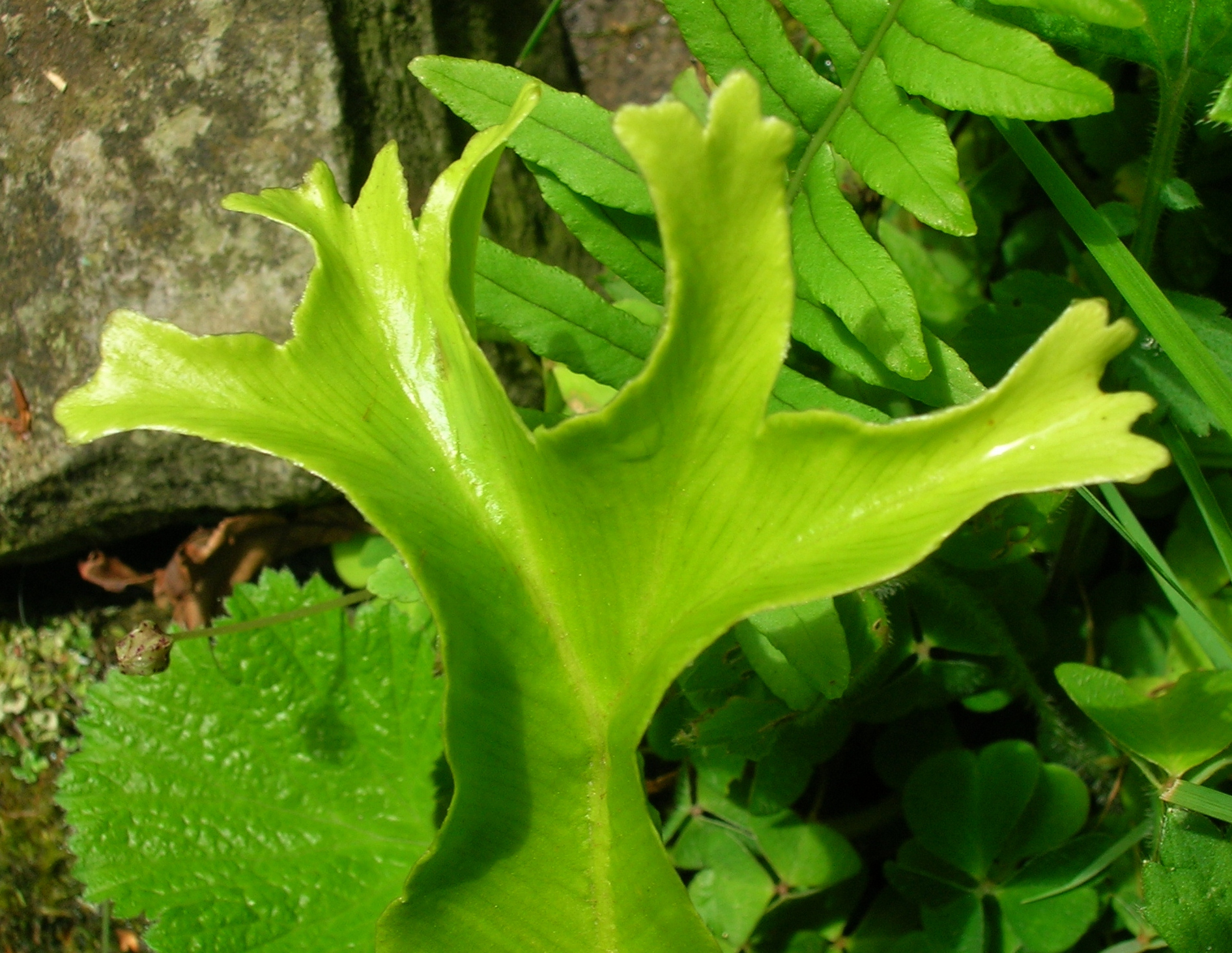
Hart's Tongue sport with multiple frond-tip branches.

Misidentification

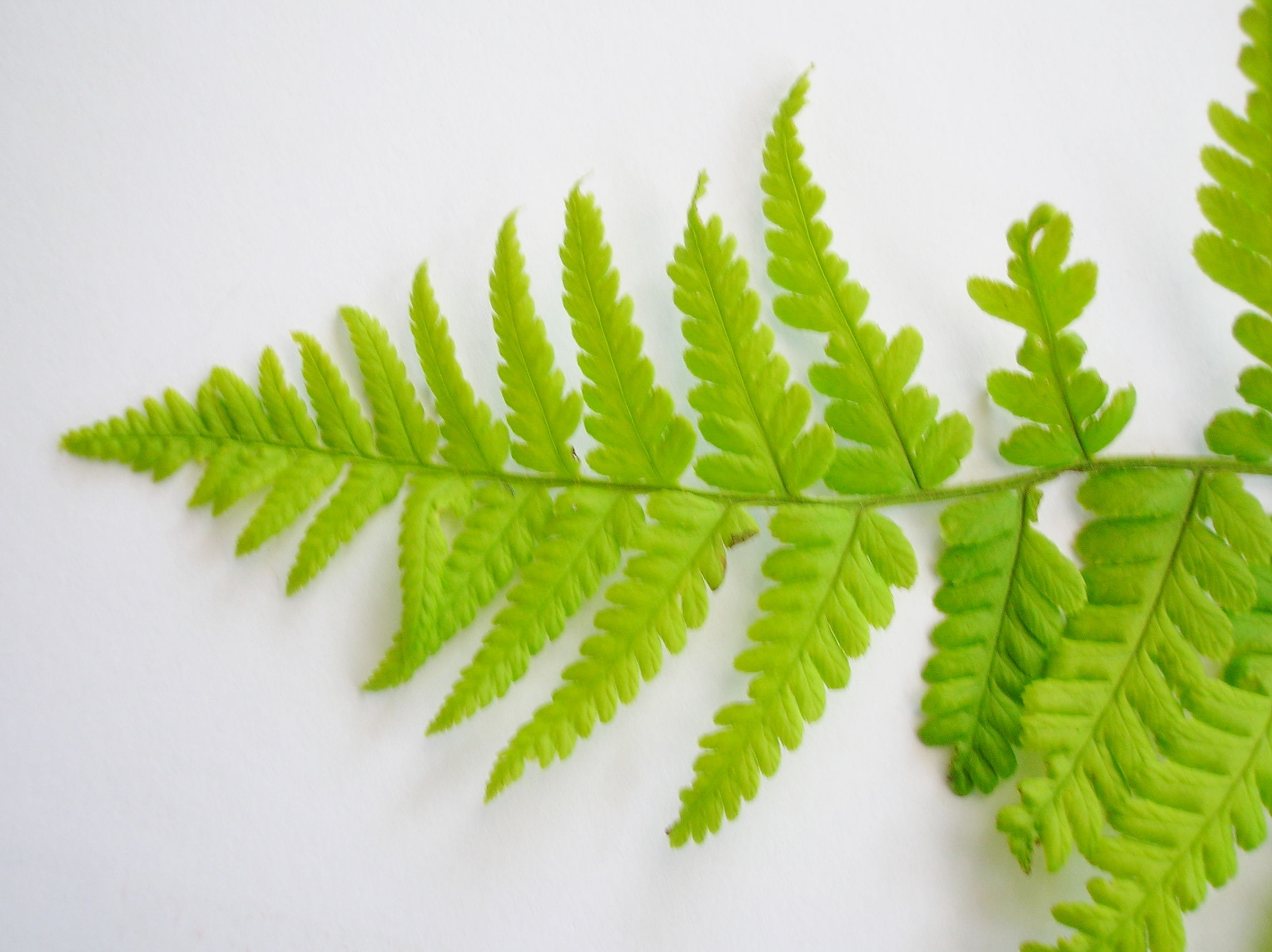
Typical asymmetric frond resulting from likely insect damage.

Galls on ferns and other physical damage to fern fronds can be mistaken as sports, however this is usually asymmetric, ferns generally being bilaterally symmetrical. In Athyrium and Dryopteris species white maggots of Chirosia betuleti create mop-head galls on fern frond tips that look somewhat like fern sports, however this is physical damage and not a growth form.

== Rarity ==
Ferns sports particularly suffered during the Victorian-era Pteridomania ('Fern-Fever') craze, when over collecting of fern species included over collecting unusual fern varieties.

== See also ==
- Knotting gall
