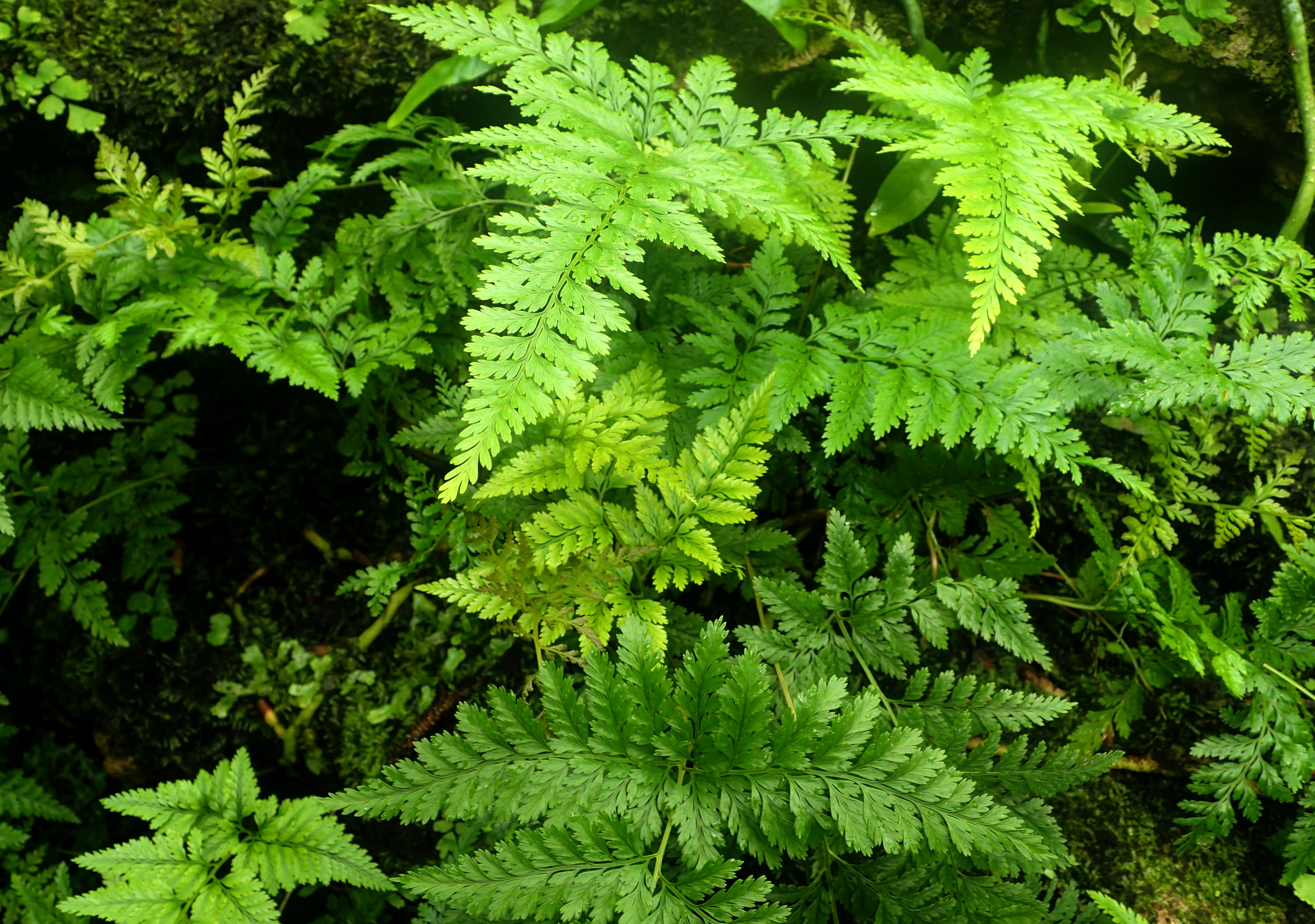
- Davallia trichomanoides at Garfield Park Conservatory

Scientific classification
- Kingdom: Plantae
- Clade: Tracheophytes
- Division: Polypodiophyta
- Class: Polypodiopsida
- Order: Polypodiales
- Suborder: Polypodiineae
- Family: Davalliaceae
- Genus: Davallia
- Species: D. trichomanoides

Binomial name
- Davallia trichomanoides Blume

= Davallia trichomanoides =

Species of fern

Davallia trichomanoides, also known as black rabbit's foot fern and squirrel foot fern, is a widespread fern in the family Davalliaceae found across southeast Asia. Its height is from 15 to 45 cm. Partial or full shade is required for the growth of it. It can survive in dryness. They have pinnate leaves. Like most ferns, it grows in line with apical dominance, in case of disturbances it is able to change the main stem of the plant. Its chloroplast genome was sequenced for the first time in 2025.
