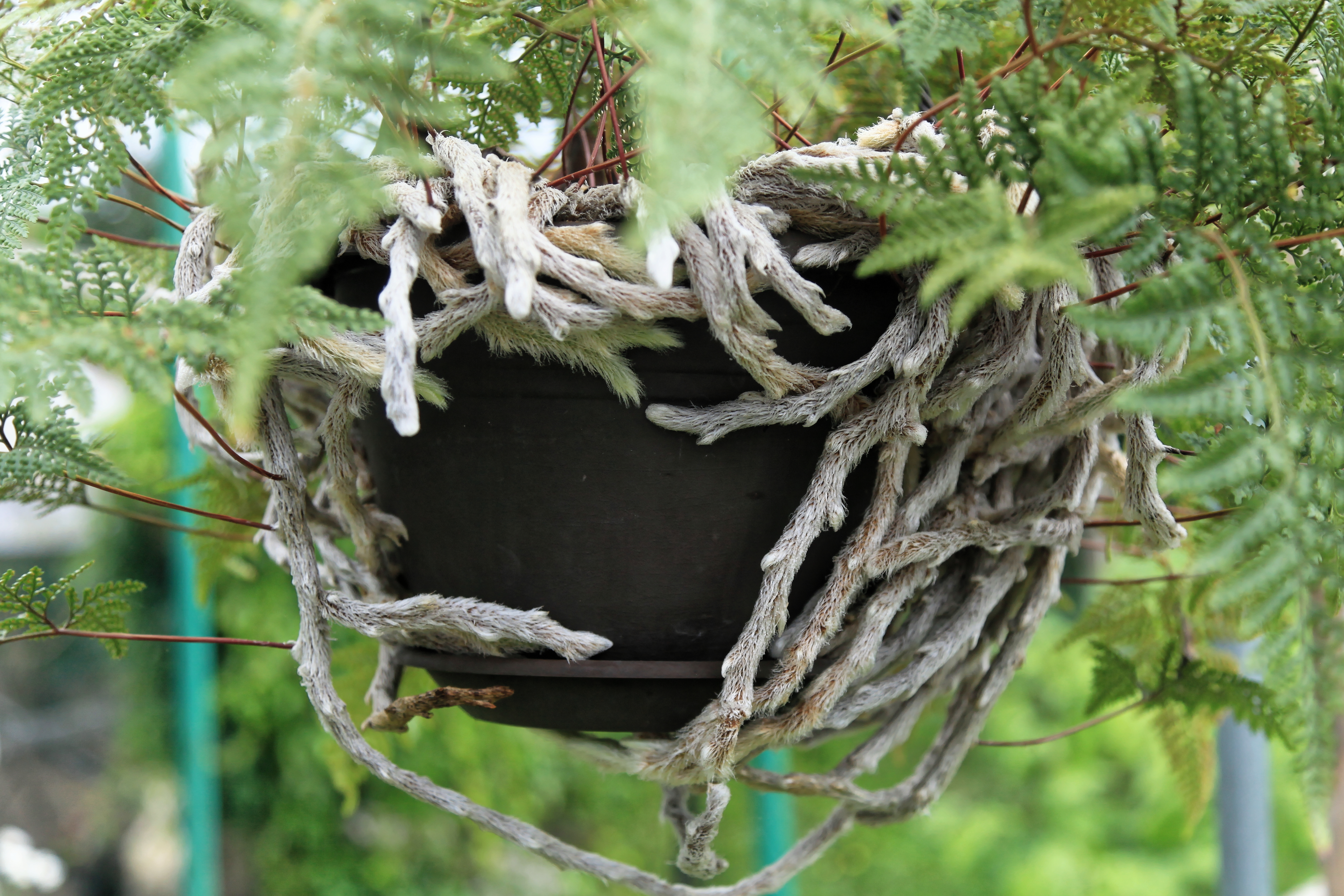
- Fuzzy rhizomes leave the soil and resemble rabbit's feet
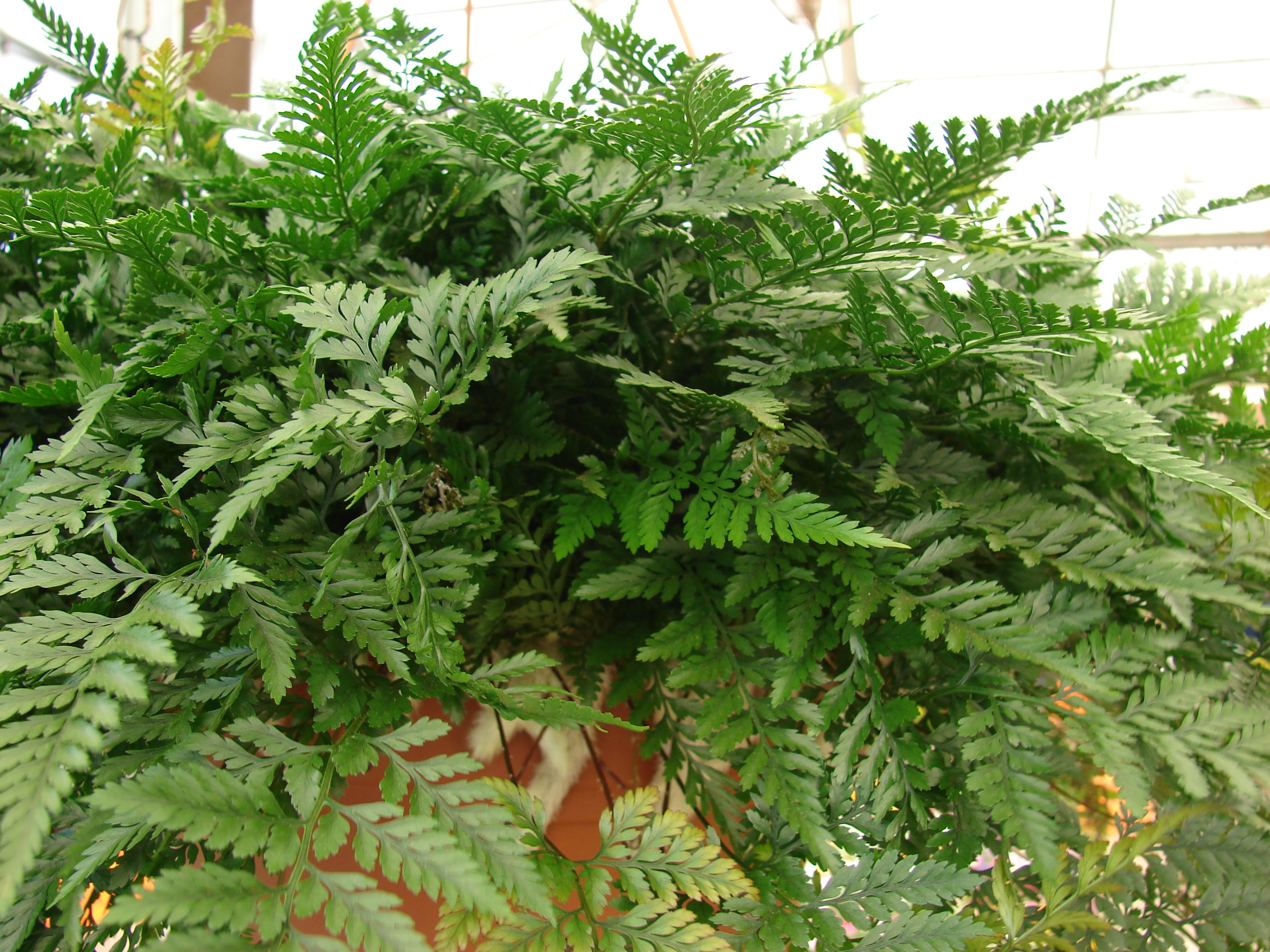
- In a Walmart, Maui

Scientific classification
- Kingdom: Plantae
- Clade: Tracheophytes
- Division: Polypodiophyta
- Class: Polypodiopsida
- Order: Polypodiales
- Suborder: Polypodiineae
- Family: Davalliaceae
- Genus: Davallia
- Species: D. tyermanii

Binomial name
- Davallia tyermanii (T.Moore) H.J.Veitch

Synonyms
- Humata tyermanii T.Moore

= Davallia tyermanii =

Species of plant

Davallia tyermanii, (Note: Many authorities use the spelling Davallia tyermannii, and D. tyermanni, D. teyermannii and D. teyermanii are also seen.) the bear's foot fern or white rabbit's foot fern, is a species of fern in the family Davalliaceae, native to northern Myanmar, southern China, and Taiwan. A rhizomatous epiphyte or lithophyte reaching 0.5 m (1 ft 8 in), it is typically found in the subtropics. Under its synonym Humata tyermanii it has gained the Royal Horticultural Society's Award of Garden Merit. It is available from commercial suppliers, and requires full sun.

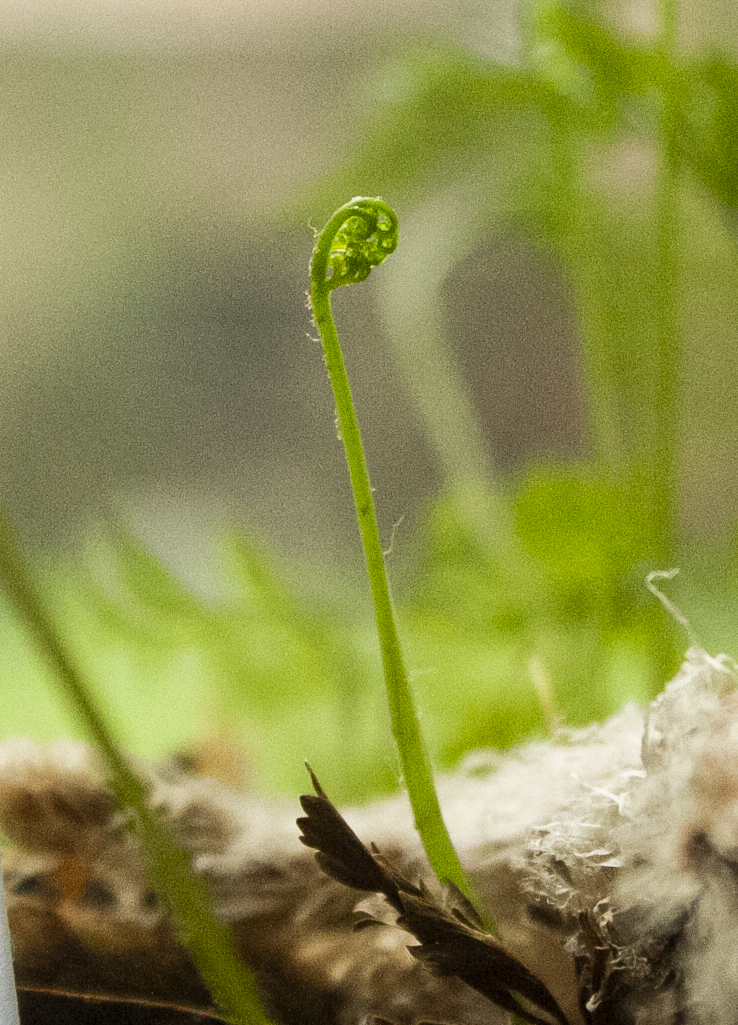
Fiddlehead
