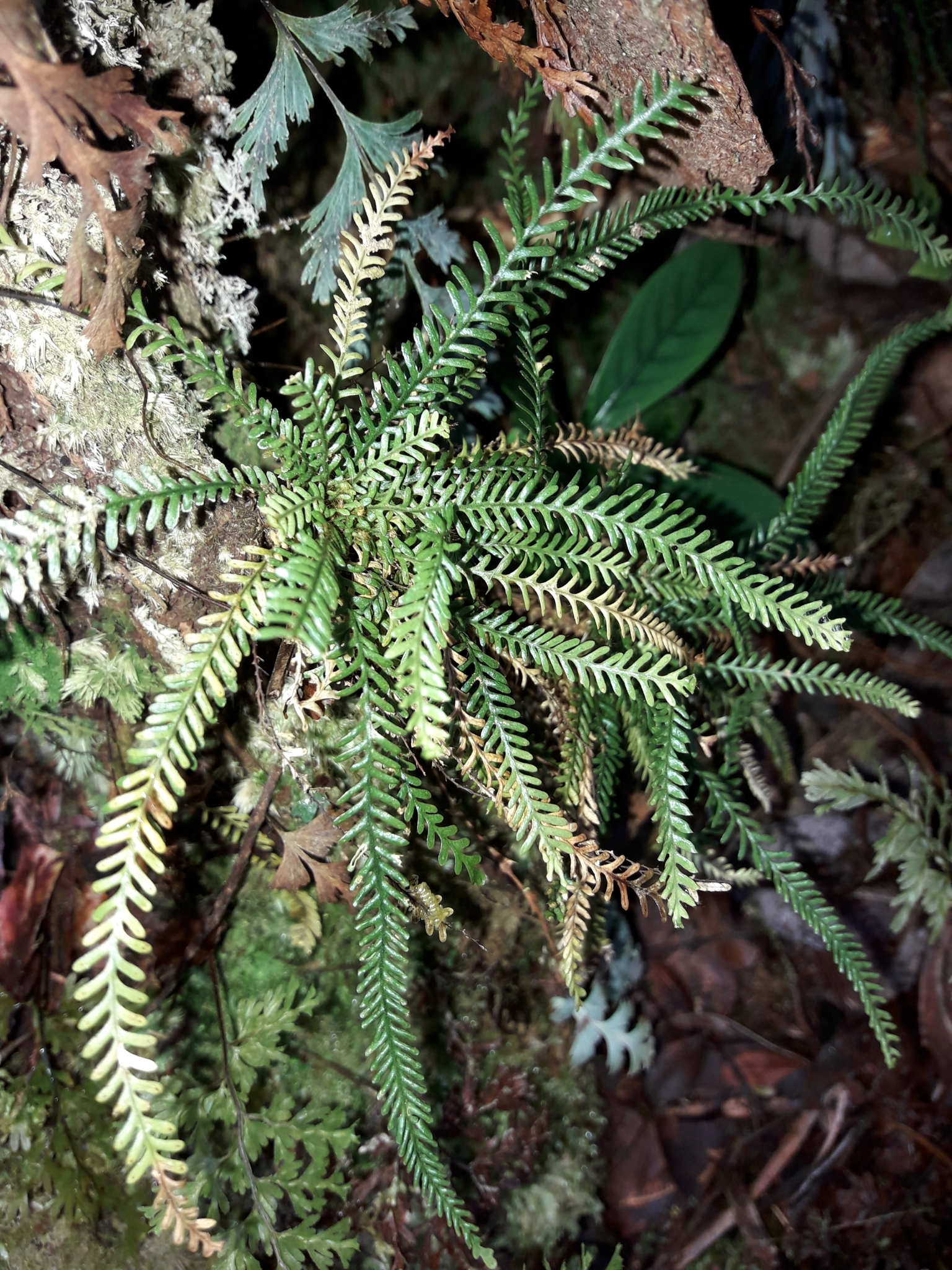

Conservation status
- Endangered (IUCN 3.1)

Scientific classification
- Kingdom: Plantae
- Clade: Tracheophytes
- Division: Polypodiophyta
- Class: Polypodiopsida
- Order: Polypodiales
- Suborder: Polypodiineae
- Family: Polypodiaceae
- Genus: Calymmodon
- Species: C. cucullatus

Binomial name
- Calymmodon cucullatus (Nees & Blume) C.Presl

= Calymmodon cucullatus =

Species of fern

Calymmodon cucullatus is a species of grammitid fern. It is endemic to China. Its natural habitat is subtropical or tropical moist lowland forests. It is threatened by habitat loss.
