= Frond =

Collection of leaflets on a plant

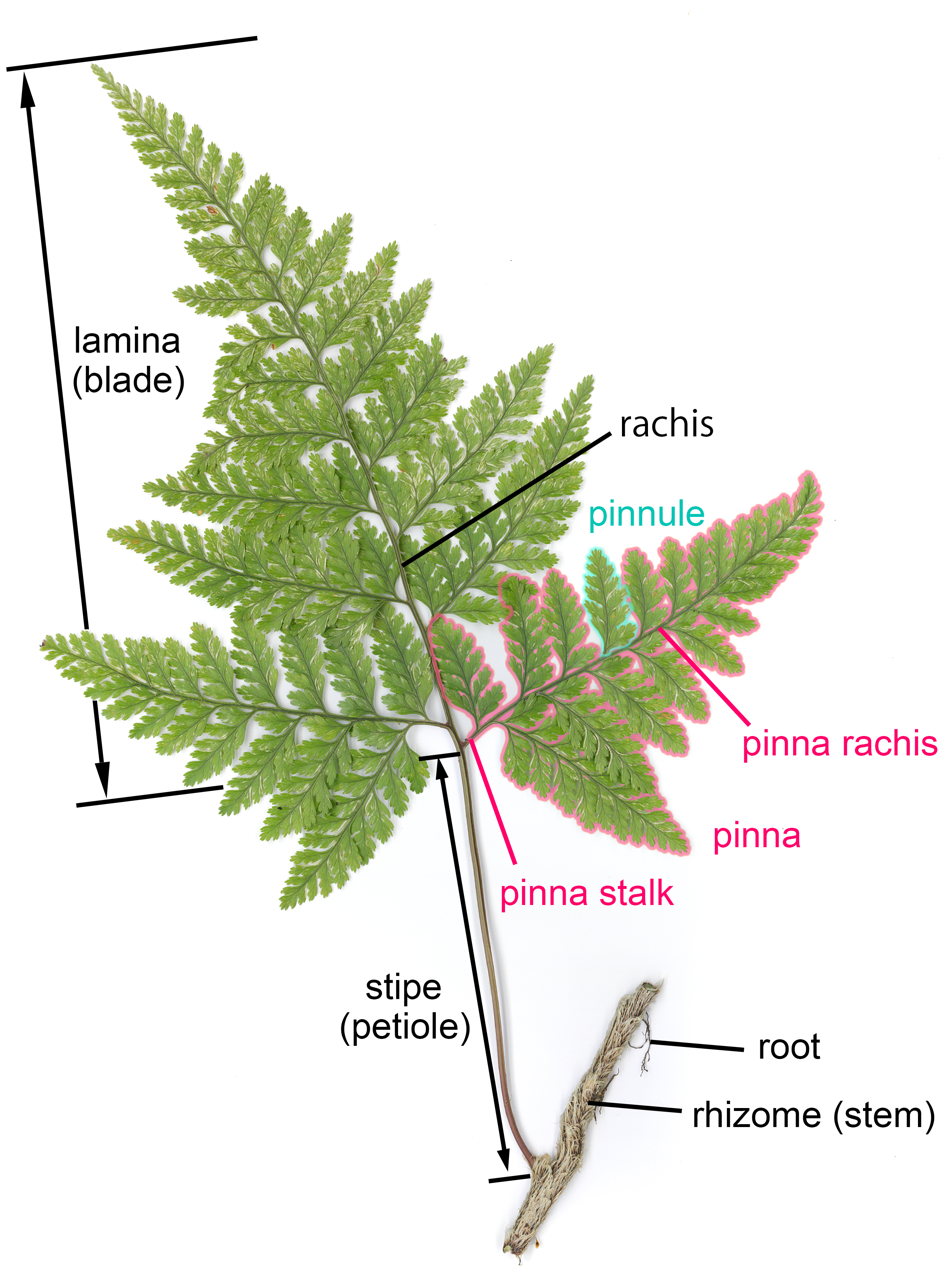
The names of fern frond parts (Davallia tyermanii)

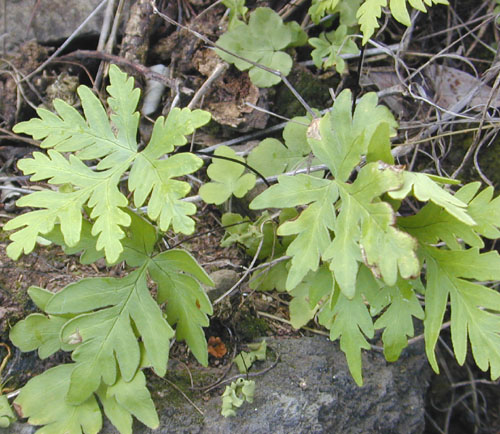
A fern (Dryopteris decipiens) with simple (lobed or pinnatifid) blades, the dissection of each blade not quite reaching to the rachis.

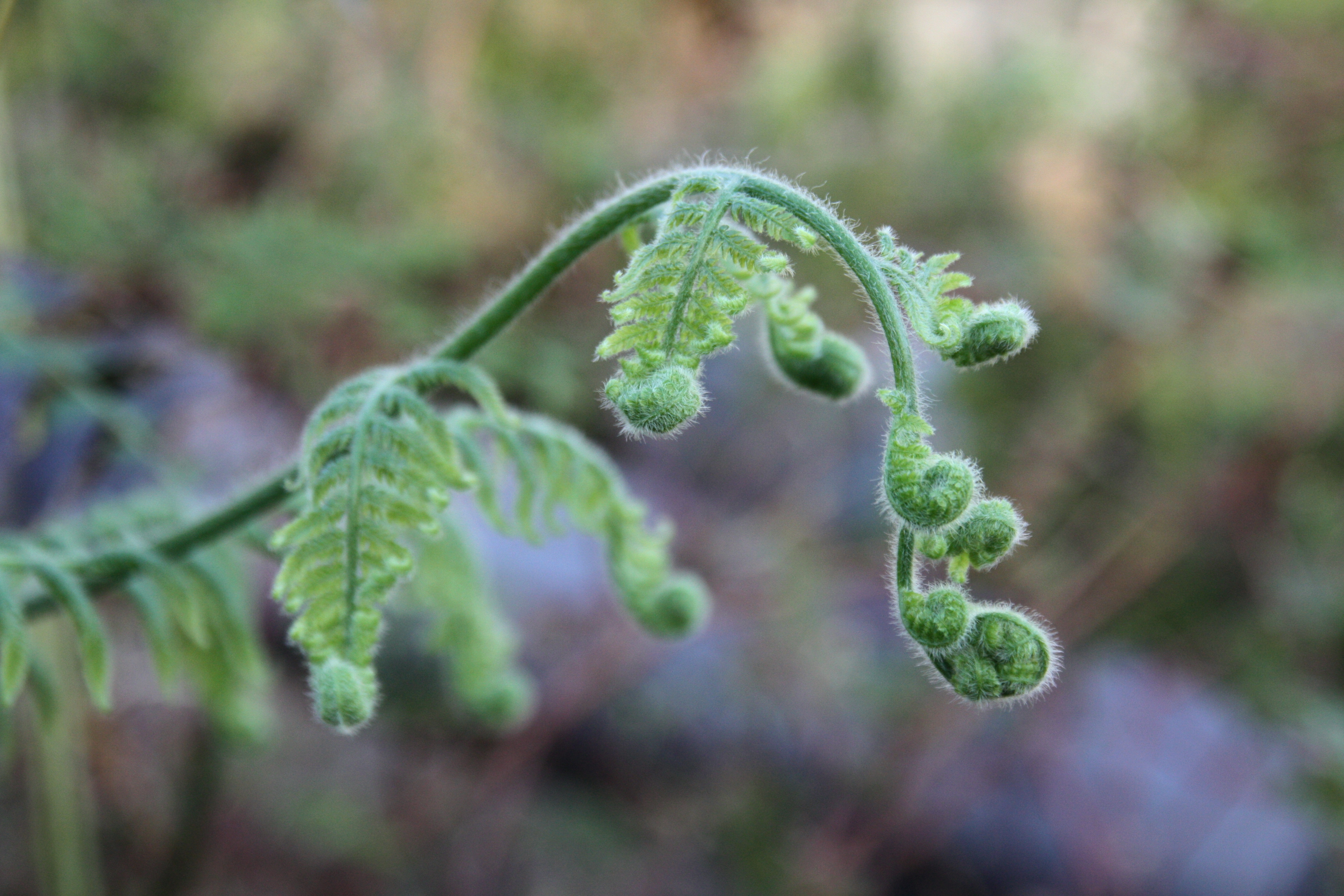
A growing fern frond unfurling.

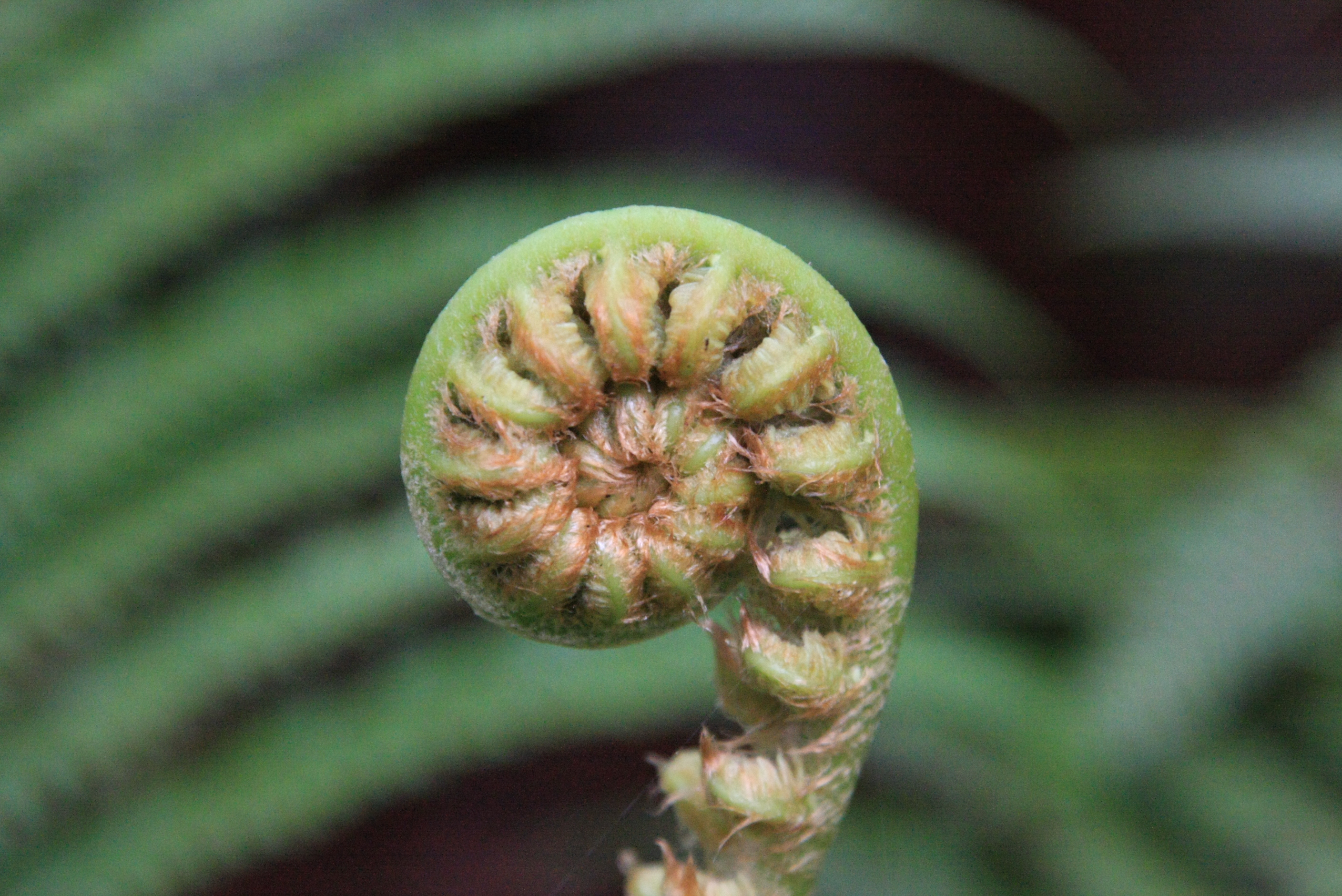
Unfurling fiddlehead fern frond

A frond is a large, divided leaf. In both common usage and botanical nomenclature, the leaves of ferns are referred to as fronds and some botanists restrict the term to this group. Other botanists allow the term frond to also apply to the large leaves of cycads, as well as palms (Arecaceae) and various other flowering plants, such as mimosa or sumac. "Frond" is commonly used to identify a large, compound leaf, but if the term is used botanically to refer to the leaves of ferns and algae it may be applied to smaller and undivided leaves. Whatever the term frond can also refer to structures or organisms of ediacaran lifeforms called Frondomorphs, which may be related to primitive animals.

Fronds have particular terms describing their components. Like all leaves, fronds usually have a stalk connecting them to the main stem. In botany, this leaf stalk is generally called a petiole, but in regard to fronds specifically it is called a stipe, and it supports a flattened blade (which may be called a lamina), and the continuation of the stipe into this portion is called the rachis. The blades may be simple (undivided), pinnatifid (deeply incised, but not truly compound), pinnate (compound with the leaflets arranged along a rachis to resemble a feather), or further compound (subdivided). If compound, a frond may be compound once, twice, or more.

== Pinnate fronds ==
In a frond which is pinnate (feather-shaped), each leafy segment of the blade is called a pinna (plural pinnae), the stalk bearing the pinna is termed a petiolule, and the main vein or mid-rib of the pinna is referred to as a costa (plural costae).

If a frond is divided once into pinnae, the frond is called once pinnate. In some fronds the pinnae are further divided into segments, creating a bipinnate frond. The segments into which each pinna are divided are called pinnules, and the extensions of the rachis that support these pinnules, are called rachillae. Rarely, a frond may even be tripinnate, in which case the pinnule divisions are known as ultimate segments.

Pinnae may be arranged along the rachis either directly opposite one another or alternating up the stem. The arrangement may change from the base of a blade to the tip, as in the example of Blechnum shown below (from base to tip: pinnae opposite to alternate, and pinnatisect to pinnatifid).

== Non-pinnate fronds ==
Some fronds are not pinnately compound (or simple), but may be palmate, costapalmate, or bifurcate.

There is a spectrum from costapalmate to palmate. Costapalmate fronds are shaped like the palm of a hand and have a short midrib or costa. Palmate fronds are also shaped like the palm of the hand, but all ribs or leaflets arise from a central area. A hastula is a flap of tissue borne at the insertion of the blade on the petiole on the upper, lower, or both leaf surfaces

Bifurcate fronds may also develop. The extinct Devonian seed plant Cosmosperma polyloba demonstrated the early evolutionary diversification of frond branching patterns, presenting both bifurcate and trifurcate types.

Some ferns, like members of the group Ophioglossales have a unique arrangement -- such as a single fleshy or amorphous leaf.

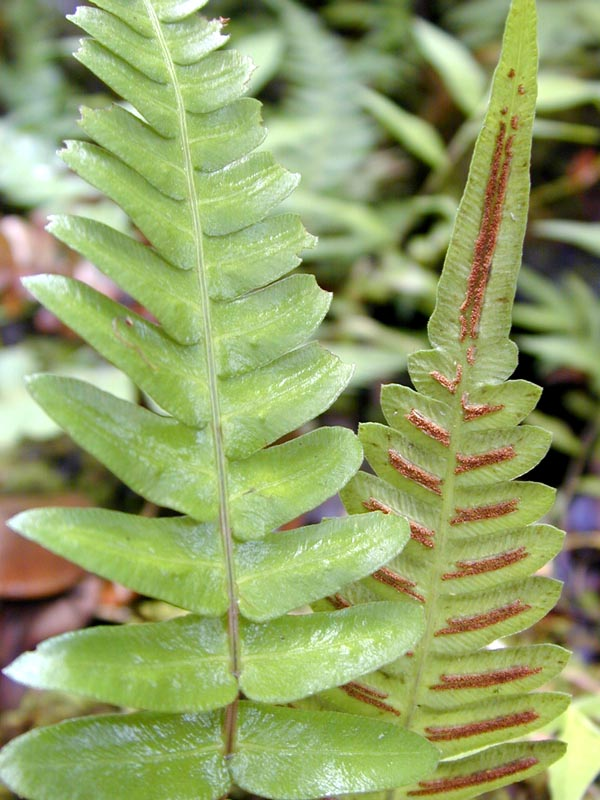
Adaxial (left) and abaxial (right) surfaces of a pinnate fern frond (Blechnum appendiculatum). Sori are evident on the abaxial surface.

== Sporangia ==
Fern fronds often bear sporangia, where the plant's spores are formed, usually on the underside (abaxial surface) of the pinnae, but sometimes marginally or scattered over the frond. The sporangia are typically clustered into a sorus (pl., sori). Associated with each sorus in many species is a membranous protective structure called an indusium, which is an outgrowth of the blade surface that may partly cover the sporangia. Some fern species feature frond dimorphism, in which fertile and sterile fronds differ in appearance and structure.

== Fern fronds ==
Fern fronds, as with all leaves, arise from the stem, either directly, or on an outgrowth from the stem termed a phyllopodium. The stem of a typical (leptosporangiate) fern is subterranean or horizontal on the surface of the ground. These stems are called rhizomes. Many fern fronds are initially coiled into a fiddle-head or crozier (see circinate vernation), although cycad and palm fronds do not have this pattern of new leaf growth.

Fronds may bear hairs, scales, glands, and, in some species, bulblets for vegetative reproduction.

== Related concepts ==
Fronds may describe several "frondose" structures in non-plant organisms -- such as the entire bodies of thalloid organisms, or the superficially leaf-like structures developed by some animals and fungi. Examples include frondose colonial bryozoans, extinct Ediacaran biota such as rangeomorphs, and some macroalgae and lichens.

In paleontology of Ediacaran marine organisms, a frond may be defined as "a rangeomorph unit with a growth tip that can generate primary branches". A frond may also refer to the entire frondose organism, including any stem or basal disc. To classify rangeomorph taxa, the frond is generally subdivided into segments as are those of a fern, and categorized by six factors: polarity, rows of branches, inflation, display/furling, alignment of branches, and presence of a basal disc.

Frondescence is the production of leaves; it can also refer to the abnormal development of floral parts into leafy structures, though this is usually called phyllody.

== Cultural significance ==
The palm frond has been a symbol of victory, triumph, peace, and eternal life originating in the ancient Mediterranean world. For example, in some Christian traditions, during Palm Sunday, Jesus’ entrance into Jerusalem is celebrated by carrying palm leaves.

During the Victorian phenomenon of Pteridomania or "fern craze", fern fronds became wildly popular symbols. Because fronds are somewhat flat, they could be used for decoration in ways that many other plants could not be. They were glued into collectors' albums, affixed to three dimensional objects, used as stencils for "spatter-work", inked and pressed into surfaces for nature printing, and so forth.

The fern flower is a magic flower in Polish folklore. As ferns are non-flowering plants, this technically refers to "fertile fronds". Certain true ferns, e.g., Osmunda regalis have sporangia in tight clusters which may appear flower-like.

== See also ==
- Fern sports – fronds that show marked change from the normal type as a result of mutation
- Acacia filicifolia – a tree whose compound leaves resemble fern fronds
