= Pseudopedate =

Pseudopedate is a term used in botany to describe the leaf architecture of certain ferns in the genus Adiantum (maidenhair ferns).

== Plants ==
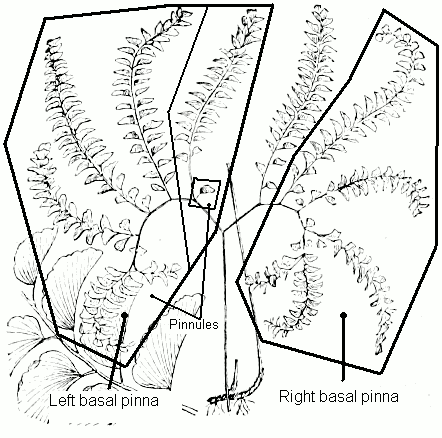
Adiantum pedatum showing the extent of the two enlarged basal pinnae, and the extent of the basiscopic and acroscopic pinnules of one of those pinnae.

Historically, certain of the maidenhair ferns, such as Adiantum pedatum, have been described as having a pedate leaf architecture, with a forked rachis which bears subdivided pinnae along the outer edge of its two outward- and backward-curving branches. However, a forking (dichotomizing) rachis is not characteristic of any other members of the Polypodiaceae. A more accurate description of such leaves was put forth by Margaret Slosson in 1906, and improved upon by Herb Wagner in the 1950s.

Slosson and Wagner showed that, in fact, the central one of the apparent "pinnae" contains the rachis of the blade; the "pinnules" adorning it are the medial and terminal pinnae. The two basal pinnae not only form the "pinnae" flanking the first "pinna" (containing the rachis), but their basal basiscopic pinnules are enlarged into another set of apparent "pinnae". In a sufficiently large specimen, the basal basiscopic segments of these are also so enlarged into another set, and so forth.

Within the genus, this architecture is shared by A. aleuticum, A. patens, A. pedatum, A. viridimontanum, and sometimes A. hispidulum.
