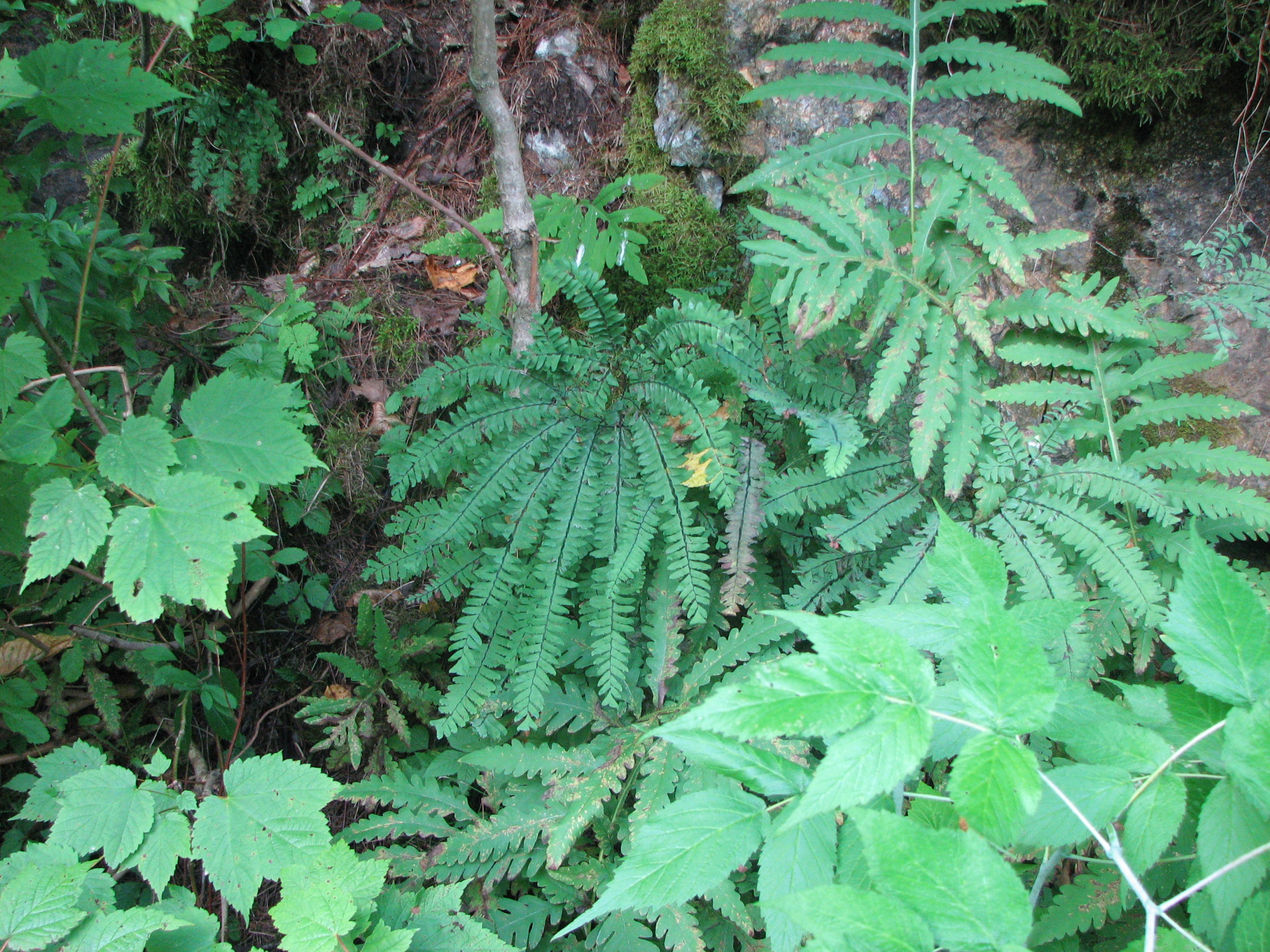
- Adiantum viridimontanum growing in a dunite roadcut

Conservation status
- Vulnerable (NatureServe)

Scientific classification
- Kingdom: Plantae
- Clade: Tracheophytes
- Division: Polypodiophyta
- Class: Polypodiopsida
- Order: Polypodiales
- Family: Pteridaceae
- Genus: Adiantum
- Species: A. viridimontanum

Binomial name
- Adiantum viridimontanum C.A.Paris

Synonyms
- Adiantum pedatum subsp. viridimontanum (C.A.Paris) Fraser-Jenk.

= Adiantum viridimontanum =

Green Mountain maidenhair

Species of fern

Adiantum viridimontanum, commonly known as Green Mountain maidenhair fern, is a fern found only in outcrops of serpentine rock in New England and Eastern Canada. The leaf blade is cut into finger-like segments, themselves once-divided, which are borne on the outer side of a curved, dark, glossy rachis. These finger-like segments are not individual leaves, but parts of a single compound leaf. The "fingers" may be drooping or erect, depending on whether the individual fern grows in shade or sunlight. Spores are borne under false indusia at the edge of the subdivisions of the leaf, a characteristic unique to the genus Adiantum.

Until 1991, A. viridimontanum was grouped with the western maidenhair fern, A. aleuticum, which grows both in western North America and as a disjunct on serpentine outcrops in eastern North America. At one time, A. aleuticum itself was classified as a variety (A. pedatum var. aleuticum) of the northern maidenhair fern, A. pedatum. However, after several years of study, botanist Cathy Paris recognized that A. aleuticum was a distinct species, and that some of the specimens that had been attributed to that taxon (group of organisms) were a third, hybrid species intermediate between A. pedatum and A. aleuticum. She named the new species A. viridimontanum for the site of its discovery in the Green Mountains in Vermont; it has since been located in Quebec and in one site in coastal Maine.

A. viridimontanum is difficult to distinguish from its parent species in the field. It can generally be separated from A. pedatum by the shape of the ultimate segments (the smallest divisions of the leaf), and by its habitat on thin, exposed serpentine soils rather than in rich woodlands. It more closely resembles A. aleuticum; but the stalks of the ultimate segments and the false indusia are longer and the spores larger.

Due to its limited distribution and similarity to other Adiantum species within its range, little is known of its ecology. It thrives on sunny, disturbed areas where ultramafic rock is covered with thin soil, such as road cuts, talus slopes, and asbestos mines. Individual plants seem long-lived, and new individuals only infrequently reach maturity. It is one of four species endemic to serpentine in eastern North America and is considered globally threatened due to its habitat restrictions.

== Description ==
Adiantum viridimontanum is a medium-sized, deciduous, terrestrial fern, about 2 feet (60 cm) wide and 1 to 2 feet (30 to 60 cm) high. Its fronds range from 30 to 75 cm (12 to 30 in) in length from the base of the leaf stalk to the tip. Like many ferns, the frond of A. viridimontanum is divided into a series of leaflets, known as pinnae, and the pinnae are further divided into pinnules. The shape of the frond in A. pedatum, A. aleuticum, and A. viridimontanum is very similar. They are usually described as having a rachis that forks into two branches, which curve outwards and backwards. Several pinnae grow from the outer side of the curve of each rachis branch, with the longest pinnae located closest to the fork of the rachis. The fingerlike pinnae are pinnately divided into short-stalked pinnules.

However, this interpretation of the frond architecture (pedately divided into pinnae, then pinnately divided into pinnules) presents a problem: no other species of Adiantum, nor any other member of the Polypodiaceae sensu lato (the family in which Adiantum was once included) has a forking rachis. In fact, these species are not pedate, but pseudopedate. What appears to be a fork in the rachis is in fact the junction between the rachis and a basal pinna. That basal pinna makes up one of the two curving branches; the rachis runs straight up the first fingerlike segment on the other branch, while the remainder of that curving branch is made up of the other basal pinna. Both basal pinnae are further divided and subdivided to create the other fingerlike segments. Therefore, even though they appear structurally similar, the longest and most central fingerlike segment represents the tip of the frond, pinnately divided into pinnae (the first level of division of the frond), while the two shorter fingerlike segments immediately on either side of it are pinnae, pinnately divided into pinnules (the second level of division). Each fingerlike segment thereafter represents a level of division one greater than the one that precedes it. Therefore, the final, pinnate subdivisions of each fingerlike segment may be referred to as "ultimate segments" to avoid the technical inaccuracy of calling them pinnules.

The rhizome shows little branching, with intervals of 4.0 to 7.5 mm between nodes. It measures 2.0 to 3.5 mm in diameter. The rhizome and the stipe (the stalk of the leaf, below the blade) have bronze-colored scales. The stipe and rachis range from chestnut brown to dark purple in color and are glabrous; the stipe is about 2 to 3 mm in diameter while the rachis is smaller, 1 to 2 mm. The basal pinnae are from three to seven times pinnate (due to the pseudopedate structure of the blade), while the apical parts of the blade (and the corresponding segments of the basal pinnae) are once-pinnate. The penultimate segments of the blade (the apparent "pinnae", or fingerlike segments) are typically lanceolate in shape. The overall arrangement of the penultimate segments ranges from drooping and fan-shaped on plants growing in the shade to funnel-shaped on plants growing in full sun; under the latter conditions, the segments stand stiffly erect.

The ultimate segments of the divided blade (the apparent "pinnules") are borne on short, dark stalks of 0.6 to 1.5 mm, with the dark color often spreading into the base of each segment. They are long and obliquely triangular, the basiscopic margin forming the hypotenuse. The tip of the segments is typically acute, but entire (not pointed). They measure from 9.5 to 22.5 mm in length and 4.2 to 7.5 mm in breadth, the average length being about 2.5 times the breadth. Their tissue is herbaceous (firmly leafy) to chartaceous (parchment-like) in texture, and bright green to bluish-green in color. As in other members of Adiantum, the glabrous leaves shed water when young. Under shady conditions, the ultimate segments lie within the plane of the blade, but tend to twist out of the plane when grown in the sun. The acroscopic margins of these segments are lobed, with narrow (less than 1.0 mm) incisions lying between lobes. In fertile segments, these lobes are recurved to form false indusia beneath the leaf. These are transversely oblong, from 2 to 5 mm in length and from 0.6 to 1.4 mm in width.

The sporangia (the fern's spore-bearing structures) are borne on the underside of the leaf beneath the false indusium, a trait found in all members of Adiantum and not in any species outside it. The sori are round, and are found on veins ending in the false indusium, below the veins' ends. The spores are tetrahedral to globose, yellow in color, and measure 41 to 58 micrometers (μm) in diameter (averaging 51.4 μm), on average larger than other species in the A. pedatum complex. Spores appear in the summer and fall. The species has a chromosome number of 116 in the sporophyte.

=== Identification ===
Adiantum viridimontanum closely resembles the other species in the A. pedatum complex (A. pedatum and A. aleuticum), and distinguishing the three in the field is difficult. Paris and Windham, in their study of the complex, noted that while each species, collectively, can be distinguished from the others, no single morphological character was absolutely distinctive among species. Sterile triploid hybrids between A. viridimontanum and the other two species may occur, further complicating field identification.

One potentially distinguishing character is the shape of the ultimate segments in the middle part of the leaf blade, which are oblong in A. pedatum and long-triangular or reniform (kidney-shaped) in A. viridimontanum and some specimens of A. aleuticum. Furthermore, A. viridimontanum can grow in both shade and sun, while A. pedatum grows in shade only.

Adiantum viridimontanum can be separated from the morphologically similar individuals of A. aleuticum by the greater length of the stalks on the medial ultimate segments and of the false indusia, measuring greater than 0.9 mm and greater than 3.5 mm, respectively, in A. viridimontanum. Spore size is also a useful character (although not easily measured in the field); the average A. viridimontanum spore measures 51.4 μm in diameter. While A. aleuticum spores can reach up to 53 μm, they average about 43 μm. In A. aleuticum growing as a disjunct on eastern serpentine (the specimens most likely to be confused with A. viridimontanum), the rhizome is much more frequently branched, with intervals of 1.0 to 2.0 mm between nodes.

== Taxonomy ==
The work which led to the recognition of Adiantum viridimontanum as a distinct taxon began in the early 20th century. Following the discovery of disjunct specimens of western maidenhair fern, then classified as A. pedatum var. aleuticum, on the serpentine tableland of Mount Albert by Merritt Lyndon Fernald in 1905, botanists began to search for western maidenhair on ultramafic outcrops elsewhere in Quebec and Vermont. It was first identified in Vermont by L. Frances Jolley in 1922 at Belvidere Mountain in Eden. In 1983, William J. Cody transferred A. pedatum growing on serpentine, both in eastern and western North America, to A. pedatum subsp. calderi instead. Many of the stations for the fern in Vermont were described in 1985, in a survey of ultramafic outcrops in that state.

From 1983 to 1985, Cathy A. Paris, then a graduate student, gathered specimens of A. pedatum from non-serpentine soils in the Midwest and Vermont, and from serpentine soils in New England and Canada, for biosystematic analysis. In 1988, Paris and Michael D. Windham published the results of this analysis, revealing A. pedatum in North America to be a cryptic species complex. They showed that A. pedatum sensu lato included two well-distinguished diploid taxa, one found in the Eastern woodlands, and the other found both in the Western mountains and as a disjunct on serpentine in the East. However, not all of the serpentine disjuncts proved to belong to the Western taxon. Several of them, including most of the specimens in Vermont, were found to be tetraploid, forming a taxon distinguishable from the two diploids. Isozyme banding patterns suggested that the tetraploid had arisen by hybridization between the eastern subspecies of non-serpentine woodlands and the western and serpentine taxon, followed by a duplication of the hybrid genome through polyploidy (allowing the chromosomes to pair and restoring sexual fertility). This allotetraploid was also morphologically intermediate between the two taxa, although it more closely resembled the serpentine taxon (hence its referral to var. aleuticum before Paris's work). Paris formally described the tetraploid as a new species, A. viridimontanum, in 1991, and also separated the western and serpentine taxon from A. pedatum as the species A. aleuticum. The type specimen of A. viridimontanum was collected from a talus slope at the old asbestos mine on Belvidere Mountain on August 28, 1985. The sequencing of several chloroplast DNA loci has revealed that the A. viridimontanum chloroplast genome most closely resembles that of A. aleuticum, suggesting that A. aleuticum was the maternal parent of A. viridimontanum.

In 2015, Christopher Fraser-Jenkins treated it as a subspecies of a broadly defined A. pedatum as A. pedatum subsp. viridimontanum, arguing that the morphological similarity among members of the complex should outweigh the biological species concept in defining the boundaries of the species.

== Distribution and habitat ==
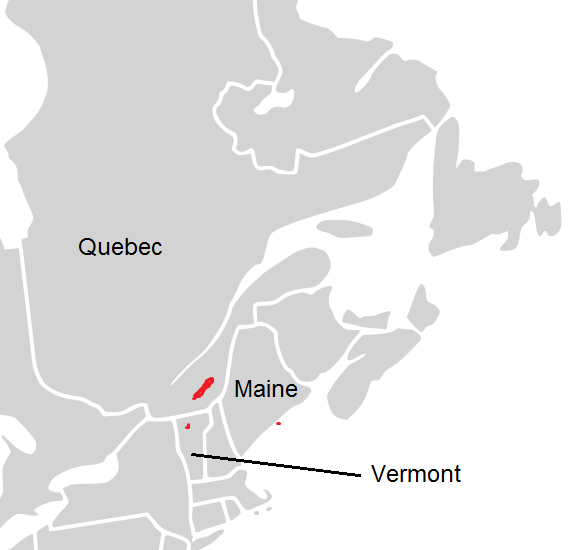
Natural distribution of A. viridimontanum within eastern Canada and the northeastern United States

Adiantum viridimontanum is narrowly distributed in New England and Quebec. At least seven stations in Vermont lie in the Missisquoi Valley, in the northern Green Mountains, giving the fern its common name. The ultramafic rocks of this area extend northwards into Quebec, where as of 2001, eight stations were known in southern Quebec and six in the Thetford Mines area. It is also known from one station on serpentine on Deer Isle, Maine.

The fern thrives in thin serpentine soils on sunny, disturbed habitats such as roadcuts and talus slopes, in dunite and other ultramafic rocks. Anthropogenic disturbance has removed thicker soils and increased sun exposure in many of these sites; for instance, many of the Quebec stations are in asbestos mines, both abandoned and active. In more natural habitats, frost weathering and erosion may promote rock fall and maintain suitable habitat. A detailed quantitative analysis of habitat preferences has shown that while A. viridimontanum occupies similar habitat to A. aleuticum in northeastern North America (ultramafic ledges, mine dumps, etc.), it also occupies serpentine-influenced northern hardwood forests, where the calcium-rich forest habitats preferred by A. pedatum have been altered by magnesium-rich drainage from ultramafic sites. This niche is not generally occupied by either of the two parent species.

The eastern serpentine outcrops where A. viridimontanum thrives have relatively few endemics, compared to serpentine exposures globally. A. viridimontanum is one of only five taxa (four species and a variety) that are strictly endemic to serpentine in eastern North America, and two of these, A. aleuticum and Aspidotis densa, grow on non-serpentine substrates elsewhere in North America.

== Ecology ==
Adiantum viridimontanum largely reproduces asexually by branching rather than sexually through spores. While wind-blown spores can result in sexual reproduction for the species, most spores probably fall within a relatively short radius of the plant. In addition, reproduction through spore dispersal requires the spore to land in suitable conditions for generating a gametophyte, typically in bright sunlight on thin serpentine soils. These requirements allow A. viridimontanum to colonize recently disturbed sites on ultramafic outcrops, where bedrock has been exposed and competing plants have been removed. The populations appear stable, with the long life of individuals compensating for low recruitment rates.

Little is known about the role of A. viridimontanum in the ecosystem. In general, ferns are less susceptible to herbivory than flowering plants due to higher levels of toxic and distasteful compounds in their foliage. A. viridimontanum is not known to be threatened by a particular predator or disease.

== Conservation ==
Under the NatureServe conservation status system, A. viridimontanum is considered globally vulnerable (G3). It is considered critically imperiled (S1) in Maine, imperiled (S2) in Vermont and vulnerable (S3) in Quebec.

Conservation of A. viridimontanum is primarily limited by its restricted habitat on serpentine cliffs and talus slopes which are of little value to humans. The most likely threat to the species is expansion of asbestos mining, which often occurs near populations of the fern, or other reuse of abandoned asbestos mines. Road construction might also threaten some sites, although this is mitigated by the fern's ability to flourish on disturbed serpentine. None of the sites are as yet known to be invaded by non-native plants. The species is considered more difficult to cultivate than either of its parent species.

== Notes and references ==
=== Works cited ===
- Cobb, Boughton; Farnsworth, Elizabeth; Lowe, Cheryl (2004). A Field Guide to Ferns of Northeastern and Central North America. Peterson Field Guides. New York: Houghton Mifflin. ISBN 0-618-39406-0.
- Cody, William J. (January 1983). "Adiantum pedatum ssp. calderi, a new subspecies in northeastern North America". Rhodora. 85 (841): 93–96. JSTOR 23311123.
- Cullina, William (2008). Native Ferns, Moss & Grasses. New York: Houghton Mifflin. ISBN 978-0-618-53118-9.
- Fernald, M.L. (1905). "An alpine Adiantum". Rhodora. 7 (83): 190–192. JSTOR 23293670.
- Fraser-Jenkins, Christopher R.; Kandel, Dhan Raj; Pariyar, Sagun (2015). Ferns and Fern-Allies of Nepal. Kathmandu: National Herbarium and Plant Laboratories, Department of Plant Resources, Ministry of Forests and Soil Conservation. ISBN 978-9937-2-9496-6.
- Gleason, Henry A.; Cronquist, Arthur (2009). Manual of Vascular Plants of Northeastern United States and Adjacent Canada. New York: The New York Botanical Garden Press. ISBN 978-0-89327-365-1.
- Dann, Kevin T. (1988). Traces on the Appalachians: A Natural History of Serpentine in Eastern North America. New Brunswick, New Jersey: Rutgers University Press. OCLC 17383706.
- Harris, Tanner B.; Rajakaruna, Nishanta (2009). "Adiantum viridimontanum, Aspidotis densa, Minuartia marcesens, and Symphyotrichum rhiannon: additional serpentine endemics from eastern North America". Northeastern Naturalist. 16 (special issue 5): 111–120. doi:10.1656/045.016.0509. S2CID 54871497.
- Jolley, L. Frances (October 1922). "A variety of maidenhair fern new to Vermont". Joint Bulletin of the Vermont Botanical and Bird Clubs (8): 40–41.
- Lu, Jin-Mei; Li, De-Zhu; Lutz, Sue; Soejima, Akiko; Yi, Tingshuang; Wen, Jun (2011). "Biogeographic disjunction between eastern Asia and North America in the Adiantum pedatum complex (Pteridaceae)". American Journal of Botany. 98 (10): 1680–1693. doi:10.3732/ajb.1100125. JSTOR 41315651. PMID 21965133.
- "Maine Rare Plant List". Maine Department of Agriculture, Conservation and Forestry. 2021.
- NatureServe (November 1, 2024). "Adiantum viridimontanum". NatureServe Explorer. Arlington, Virginia.
- Paris, Cathy A. (April 1991). "Adiantum viridimontanum, a new maidenhair fern in eastern North America". Rhodora. 93 (874): 105–121. JSTOR 23312786.
- Paris, Cathy A. (1993). "Adiantum". In Flora of North America Editorial Committee (ed.). Flora of North America North of Mexico. Vol. 2: Pteridophytes and Gymnosperms. New York and Oxford: Oxford University Press.
- Paris, Cathy A.; Windham, Michael D. (1988). "A biosystematic investigation of the Adiantum pedatum complex in eastern North America". Systematic Botany. 13 (2): 240–255. doi:10.2307/2419103. JSTOR 2419103.
- Rajakaruna, Nishanta; Boyd, Robert S. (2009). "Advances in serpentine geoecology: a retrospective" (PDF). Northeastern Naturalist. 16 (special issue 5): 3. doi:10.1656/045.016.0501. S2CID 59356565. Archived from the original (PDF) on July 25, 2011.
- Ruesink, Ana (2001). "Adiantum viridimontanum Paris (Green Mountain Maidenhair Fern) Conservation and Research Plan" (PDF). New England Wild Flower Society.
- Southgate, Morgan W.; Patel, Nikisha R.; Barrington, David S. (2019). "Ecological outcome of allopolyploidy in Adiantum (Pteridaceae): niche intermediacy and expansion into novel habitats". Rhodora. 121 (986): 108–135. doi:10.3119/18-09. S2CID 199639192.
- Zika, Peter F.; Dann, Kevin T. (July 1985). "Rare plants on ultramafic soils in Vermont". Rhodora. 87 (851): 293–304. JSTOR 23314548.
