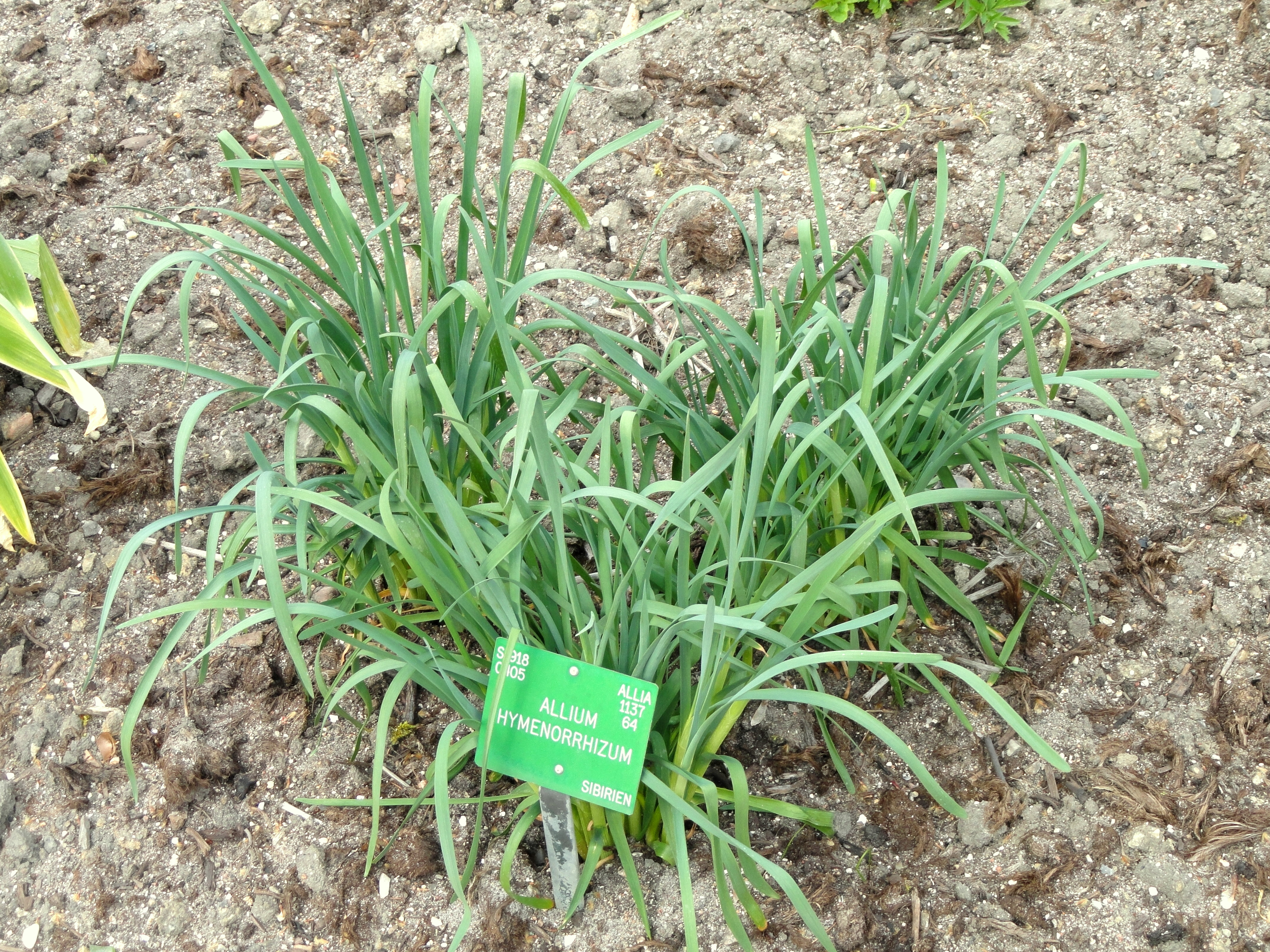
- At the University of Copenhagen Botanical Garden, Denmark

Scientific classification
- Kingdom: Plantae
- Clade: Tracheophytes
- Clade: Angiosperms
- Clade: Monocots
- Order: Asparagales
- Family: Amaryllidaceae
- Subfamily: Allioideae
- Genus: Allium
- Subgenus: A. subg. Polyprason
- Species: A. hymenorhizum

Binomial name
- Allium hymenorhizum Ledeb.

Synonyms
- Allium macrorrhizum Boiss.

= Allium hymenorhizum =

Species of flowering plant

Allium hymenorhizum is a Eurasian species of wild onion in the amaryllis family. It grows at elevations of 1100–2700 m

Allium hymenorhizum has bulbs up to 15 mm in diameter. Scape is up to 90 cm tall. Leaves are flat, narrow, less than 6 mm wide but almost as long as the scape. Umbel is densely packed with many red flowers.

== Varieties ==
Varieties include:

- Allium hymenorhizum var. dentatum J.M.Xu - Xinjiang
- Allium hymenorhizum var. hymenorhizum - European Russia, Altay Krai, Kazakhstan, Kyrgyzstan, Tajikistan, Iran, Afghanistan, Turkey, Xinjiang, Mongolia

Formerly included

Allium hymenorhizum var. tianschanicum (Rupr.) Regel, now called Allium tianschanicum Rupr.
