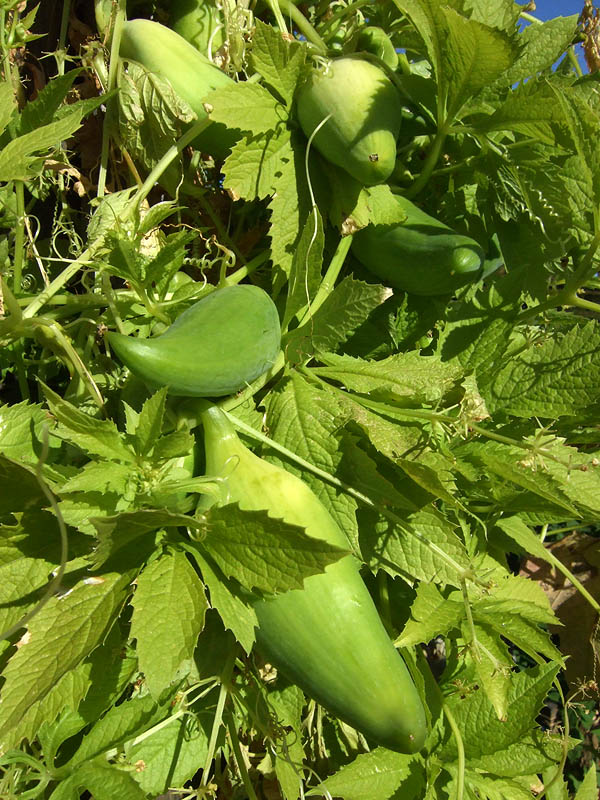

Scientific classification
- Kingdom: Plantae
- Clade: Tracheophytes
- Clade: Angiosperms
- Clade: Eudicots
- Clade: Rosids
- Order: Cucurbitales
- Family: Cucurbitaceae
- Genus: Cyclanthera
- Species: C. pedata

Binomial name
- Cyclanthera pedata (L.) Schrader

Synonyms
- Anguria pedatisecta Nees & Mart. [Spelling variant]; Anguria pedisecta Nees & Mart.; Apodanthera pedisecta (Nees & Mart.) Cogn.; Cyclanthera digitata Arn.; Cyclanthera edulis Naudin ex Huber; Momordica pedata L.

= Cyclanthera pedata =

Caigua

Species of plant

Cyclanthera pedata, known as caigua, is a herbaceous vine grown for its edible fruit, which is predominantly used as a vegetable. It is called Chocha (চোচা) in India and Bangladesh which is known from cultivation only, and its use goes back many centuries as evidenced by ancient phytomorphic ceramics from Peru depicting the fruits.

== Origin and distribution ==
Cyclanthera pedata, presumably native to the Andes, was first domesticated in the mountainous regions of Peru. It then spread to Southeast Asia and Africa. In Africa, it is only cultivated in the highlands of East Africa.

== Biology ==
C. pedata is an annual climbing plant with vines that can reach up to 4.5 meters in height. It has a thin stem and palmate leaves that are 10–12 cm wide. The small, unisexual flowers range from white to light green and are located at the leaf axils. The light green fruits are ovoid, curved, and can grow up to 20 cm in length.

== Description ==
Cyclanthera pedata is a vine that can be 12 m long; the stems are thin; and the leaves can be up to 24 cm long, palmate or pedate in shape. The small flowers can be greenish or white and are borne in racemes. The fruit is light green, ovoid, curved, up to 15 cm long, almost hollow (except for the seeds and a thin flesh layer), with smooth skin or sometimes covered in soft spines; the seeds are black.

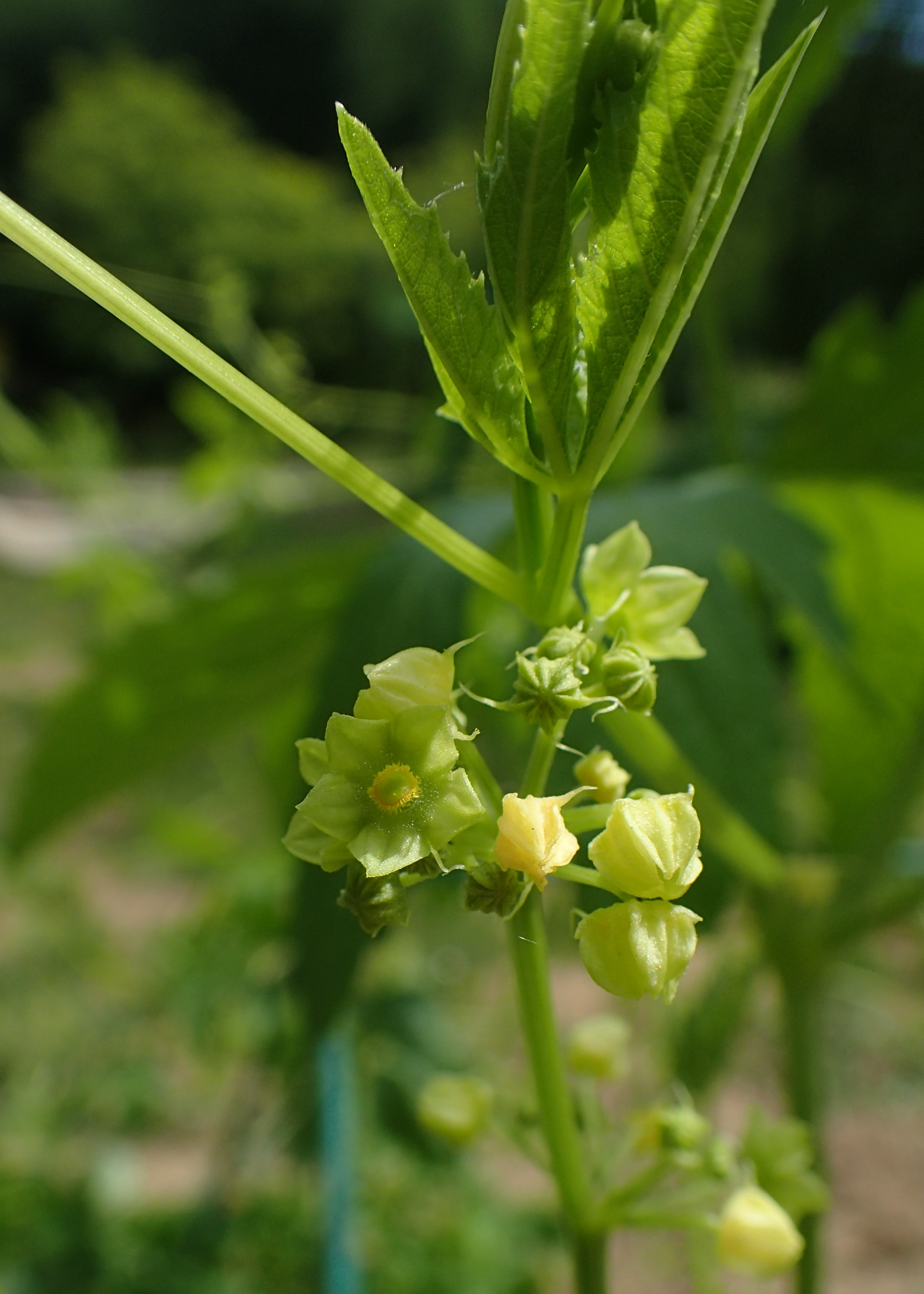
Flowers.

When the leaves are injured, it is said to release a cucumber-like odor. The fruit flesh is soft and spongy, not crunchy, with a thickness of only 0.5 cm, and it is said to taste like cucumbers.

== Cultivation ==
Cyclanthera pedata is grown at small scale farming in mountain areas of Mexico, Central America and South America. It is sometimes cultivated in Asia.

=== Climate & Soil ===
Cyclanthera pedata flourishes in cool to moderate temperatures ranging from 12–27 °C. Though it can be grown at altitudes up to 2000 m.a.s.l., the plant is sensitive to frost. It thrives in direct sunlight (at least 6-8h/day) and similarly to other Cucurbitaceae requires regular irrigation.

The ideal soil pH for C. pedata is between 6.0 and 7.0. Additionally, the plant grows best in deep, well-drained soils and does not tolerate saline soils. Planting time varies depending on regional environmental conditions, but for optimal seed germination, a temperature range of 15-20 °C is recommended.

=== Sowing & Planting ===
As Caigua is a climbing vine, trellising is crucial for support. This can be done either by plastic nets or horizontal wires.

=== Harvest ===
Immature fruits are harvested 70–90 days after sowing (mid June/July), and mature fruits at 100–120 days (August). Harvest is usually done by hand.

=== Pests and Diseases ===
The main insect pests affecting C. pedata are aphids (Aphis gossypii), fruit flies (Bactrocera cucurbitae), and the red pumpkin beetle (Aulacophora foveicollis). Several diseases also impact C. pedata, including anthracnose (Colletotrichum lindemuthianum), fusarium wilt (Fusarium oxysporum), powdery mildew (Golovinomyces tabaci), downy mildew (Peronospora destructor), and mosaic disease (Potyvirus). The fungus Geotrichum candidum may cause post-harvest losses.

== Vernacular names ==
Known in the Andes as caigua or caihua (possibly from Quechua kaywa); also as achocha (possibly from Quechua achuqcha). In English it is named stuffing cucumber or slipper gourd. In Costa Rica it is called Jaiva. In Darjeeling, Nepal, it is called Chuchay Karela. In Chinese, it is known as 小雀瓜. The people of Kashmir, India, name it "Karela".

== Uses ==
=== Food ===
The fruits are eaten after removing the seeds. Young fruits can be eaten fresh, added to salads, sautéed, or served as a side dish. Mature fruits are typically stuffed with meats, fish, or cheese and can be fried, breaded, or baked. Young shoots and leaves can also be eaten as greens. The fruits are a source of potassium, magnesium and phosphorus. Fruit flavor is similar to cucumber crossed with green bean or otherwise tasteless.

Traditionally the people of Kashmir remove its seeds and dry it, to be consumed in winters.

Caigua
Nutritional value per 100 g (3.5 oz)
- Energy: 17 kcal (71 kJ)
- Carbohydrates: 4 g
- Dietary fiber: 0.7 g
- Fat: 0.1 g
- Protein: 0.6 g
Vitamins and minerals
Vitamins	Quantity %DV^{†}
Thiamine (B1)	3% 0.04 mg
Riboflavin (B2)	3% 0.04 mg
Niacin (B3)	2% 0.3 mg
Vitamin C	16% 14 mg
Minerals	Quantity %DV^{†}
Calcium	1% 14 mg
Iron	1% 0.21 mg
Magnesium	2% 8.4 mg
Phosphorus	2% 26 mg
Potassium	5% 152 mg
Sodium	0% 0.91 mg
- Other constituents: Quantity
- Water: 94.1 %
- ^{†}Percentages estimated using US recommendations for adults, except for potassium, which is estimated based on expert recommendation from the National Academies.

== Chemistry ==
The fruits contain flavonoid glycosides of which four show an antioxidant effect.

Caigua fruits generally exhibit high antioxidant activity but a low total phenolic content, which indicates that non-phenolic water-soluble compounds might be involved. Flavonoids are present in this cyclanthera species, which have antioxidant properties as well and were shown that with a high intake are correlated to a decrease in heart disease.

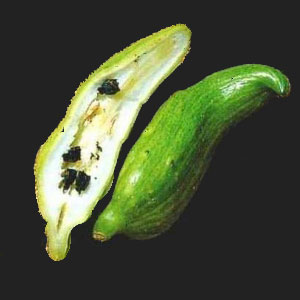
Fruit in half showing seeds.

Dried samples of caigua showed α-amylase inhibition and relevant ACE inhibitory activities. The anticholesterolemic activity of caigua was confirmed, promoting cholesterol metabolism and bile acids synthesis in a hepatic cell model, with the extract showing novel choleretic activity.

A negative aspect of caigua is, that the seeds contain a group of trypsin inhibitors, which negatively affect protein absorption.

Other chemicals in the Caigua include triterpenoid saponins and the seeds have been reported with six cucurbitacin glycosides. as well as 28-30 amino acids.

== Medicinal Applications ==
Caigua (Cyclanthera pedata) has been traditionally used in South American folk medicine for its alleged anti-inflammatory, hypoglycemic, and hypocholesterolemic effects, particularly in the management of blood pressure and cholesterol levels. It is believed to be effective against atherosclerosis, circulation problems, and is used as an analgesic. Infusions made from Caigua are commonly consumed to help control hypertension and improve cholesterol levels. In post-menopausal women, daily oral doses of dehydrated Caigua fruit have been shown to significantly reduce serum cholesterol.

== Archaeology ==
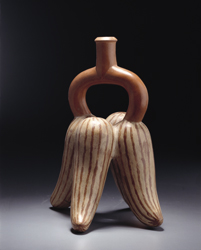
Moche culture ceramic depicting caiguas.

The Moche culture often depicted this species in their ceramics. Remains of this species have also been found buried in archaeological sites on the Peruvian coast.
