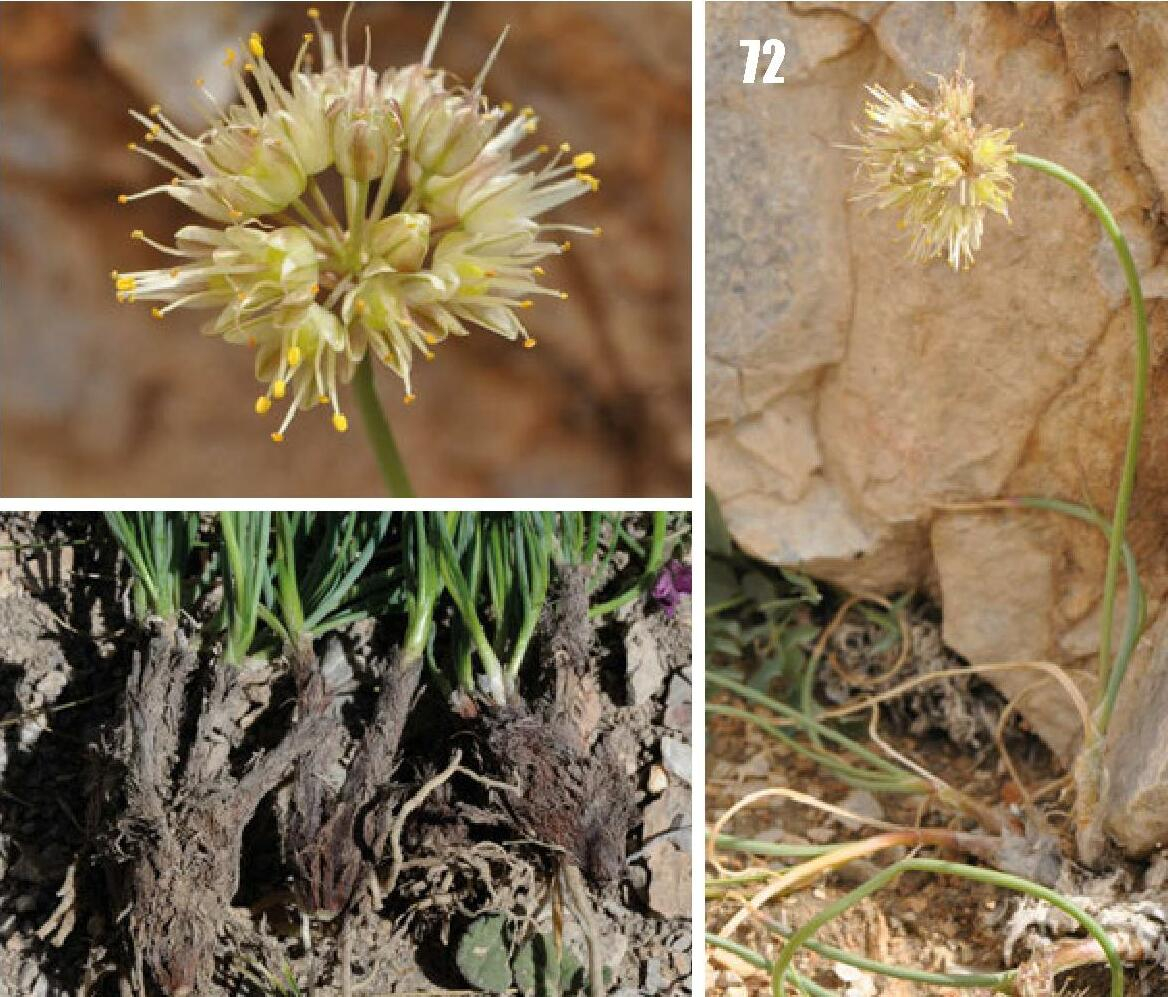

Scientific classification
- Kingdom: Plantae
- Clade: Tracheophytes
- Clade: Angiosperms
- Clade: Monocots
- Order: Asparagales
- Family: Amaryllidaceae
- Subfamily: Allioideae
- Genus: Allium
- Species: A. tianschanicum

Binomial name
- Allium tianschanicum Rupr.

Synonyms
- Allium globosum var. albidum Regel; Allium hymenorhizum var. tianschanicum (Rupr.) Regel; Allium macrorhizon Regel

= Allium tianschanicum =

Species of flowering plant

Allium tianschanicum is a plant species native to Xinjiang, Kazakhstan, Kyrgyzstan and Tajikistan.

Allium tianschanicum has a cluster of bulbs each up to 20 cm in diameter. Scape is up to 25 cm long, round in cross-section. Leaves are channeled, up to 15 mm across, shorter than the scape. Umbel is densely packed with many yellow or white flowers.
