= Cyclanthera tenuisepala =

Scientific classification
- Kingdom: Plantae
- Clade: Tracheophytes
- Clade: Angiosperms
- Clade: Eudicots
- Clade: Rosids
- Order: Cucurbitales
- Family: Cucurbitaceae
- Genus: Cyclanthera
- Species: C. tenuisepala

Binomial name
- Cyclanthera tenuisepala Cogn.

Synonyms
- Cyclanthera elegans Cogn., 1877; Cyclanthera elegans var. elegans; Cyclanthera elegans var. genuina; Cyclanthera elegans var. grandifolia; Cyclanthera elegans var. obtusiloba; Cyclanthera elegans var. warmingii; Cyclanthera tonduzii Cogn. ex T.Durand & Pittier

Species of flowering plant

Cyclanthera tenuisepala is a species of flowering plants in the family Cucurbitaceae found in Costa Rica.
