= Cyclanthera tenuifolia =

Scientific classification
- Kingdom: Plantae
- Clade: Tracheophytes
- Clade: Angiosperms
- Clade: Eudicots
- Clade: Rosids
- Order: Cucurbitales
- Family: Cucurbitaceae
- Genus: Cyclanthera
- Species: C. tenuifolia

Binomial name
- Cyclanthera tenuifolia Cogn., 1877: Cyclanthera tenuisepala var. integerrima Cogn.; Cyclanthera tenuisepala var. tenuisepala

Synonyms
- Cyclanthera elegans Cogn.; Cyclanthera elegans var. genuina Cogn.; Cyclanthera elegans var. grandifolia Cogn.; Cyclanthera elegans var. obtusiloba Cogn.; Cyclanthera elegans var. warmingii Cogn.; Cyclanthera tenuisepala var. integerrima Cogn.; Cyclanthera tonduzii Cogn. ex T.Durand & Pittier

Species of flowering plant

Cyclanthera tenuifolia is a species of flowering plants in the family Cucurbitaceae. It is found in Ecuador.
