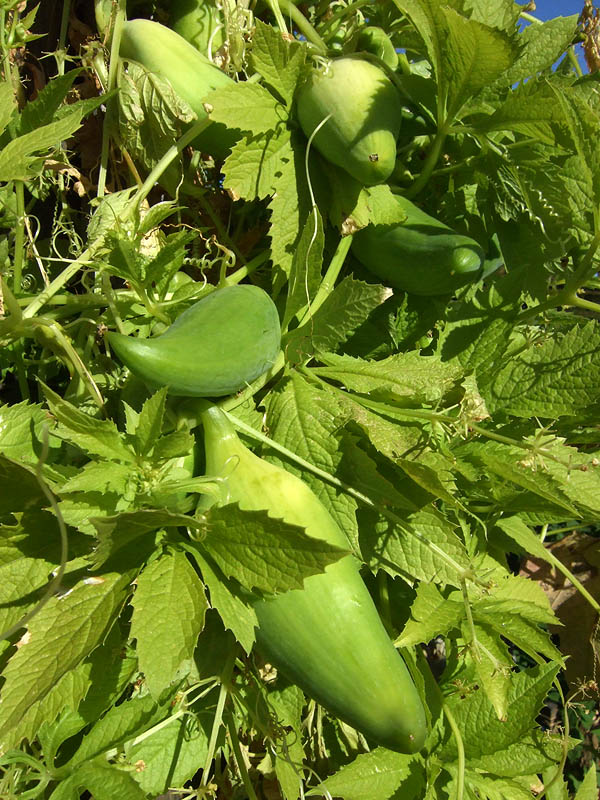
- Cyclanthera pedata

Scientific classification
- Kingdom: Plantae
- Clade: Tracheophytes
- Clade: Angiosperms
- Clade: Eudicots
- Clade: Rosids
- Order: Cucurbitales
- Family: Cucurbitaceae
- Subfamily: Cucurbitoideae
- Tribe: Sicyoeae
- Genus: Cyclanthera; Schrad. 1831

Type species
- Cyclanthera pedata (L.) Schrader

Species
- Several, including: Cyclanthera brachystachya; Cyclanthera carthagenensis; Cyclanthera pedata; Cyclanthera tenuifolia; Cyclanthera tenuisepala

Synonyms
- Cremastopus Paul G.Wilson, Hooker's Icon. Pl. 36: t. 3586. (1962); Discanthera Torr. & A. Gray Syn. Fl. N. Amer. 1: 696. (1840); Heterosicyos (S.Watson) Cockerell, Bot. Gaz. 24: 378. 1897, nom. illeg. non Welw. ex Hook. & Benth. (1867); Sicyos sect. Heterosicyos S.Watson, Proc. Amer. Acad. Arts 23: 274. (1888); Pseudocyclanthera Mart. Crov. Notul. Syst. (Paris) 15: 56. (1954); Rytidostylis Hook. & Arn. Bot. Beechey Voy. 424. (1841)

= Cyclanthera =

Genus of plants

Cyclanthera is a genus of flowering plants in the family Cucurbitaceae. The name comes from the fact that some species show extreme cases of stamen fusion forming a ring around the gynoecium, with a single locule.
