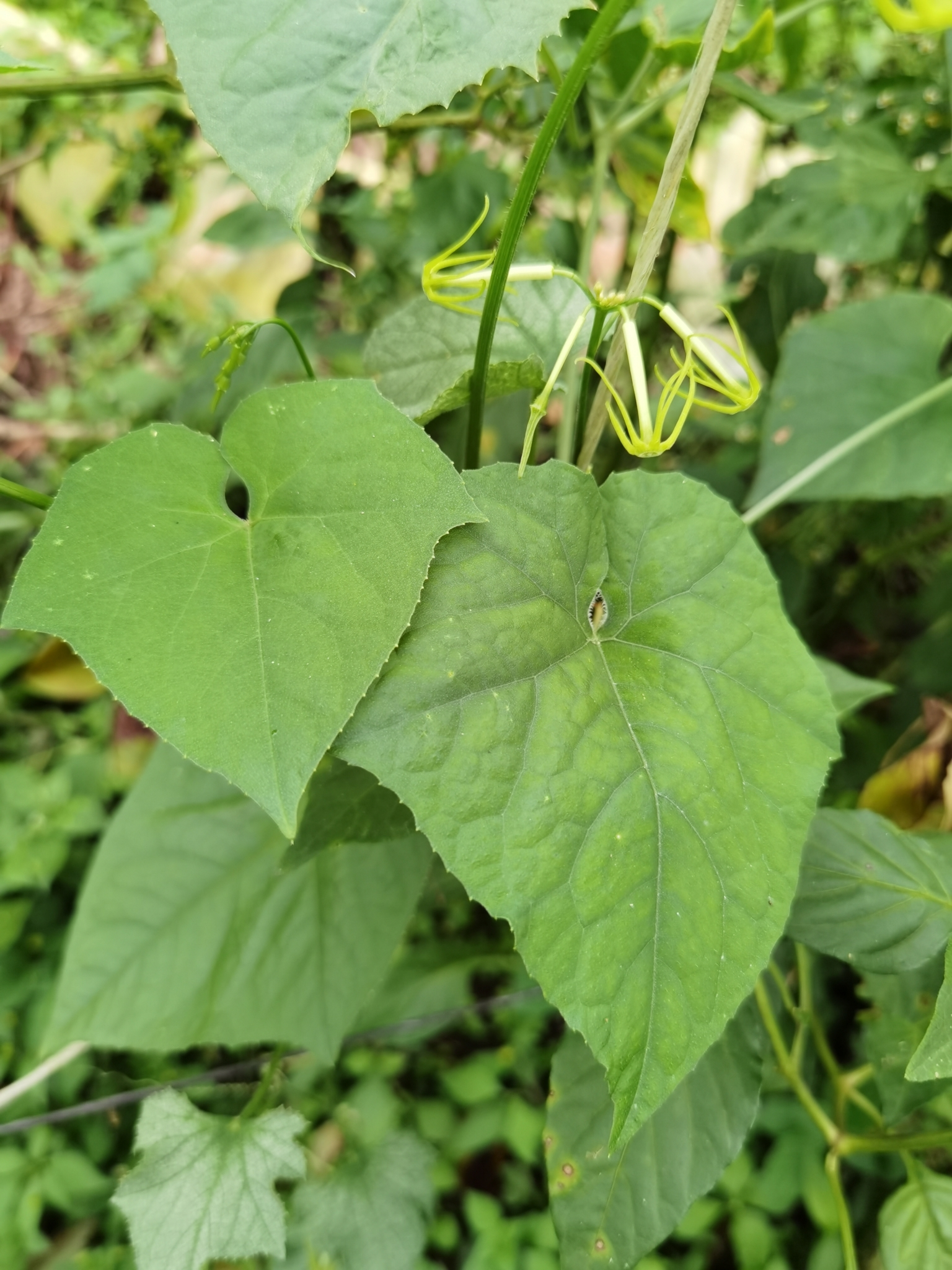

Scientific classification
- Kingdom: Plantae
- Clade: Tracheophytes
- Clade: Angiosperms
- Clade: Eudicots
- Clade: Rosids
- Order: Cucurbitales
- Family: Cucurbitaceae
- Genus: Cyclanthera
- Species: C. carthagenensis

Binomial name
- Cyclanthera carthagenensis (Jacq.) H.Schaef. & S.S.Renner

Synonyms
- Many, including: Elaterium carthagenense Jacq.; Rytidostylis carthagenensis (Jacq.) Kuntze

= Cyclanthera carthagenensis =

Species of flowering plant

Cyclanthera carthagenensis is a species of flowering plants in the family Cucurbitaceae native to Mexico to tropical South America. It is introduced and considered invasive in Cuba. It is often known by the synonym Rytidostylis carthagenensis.
