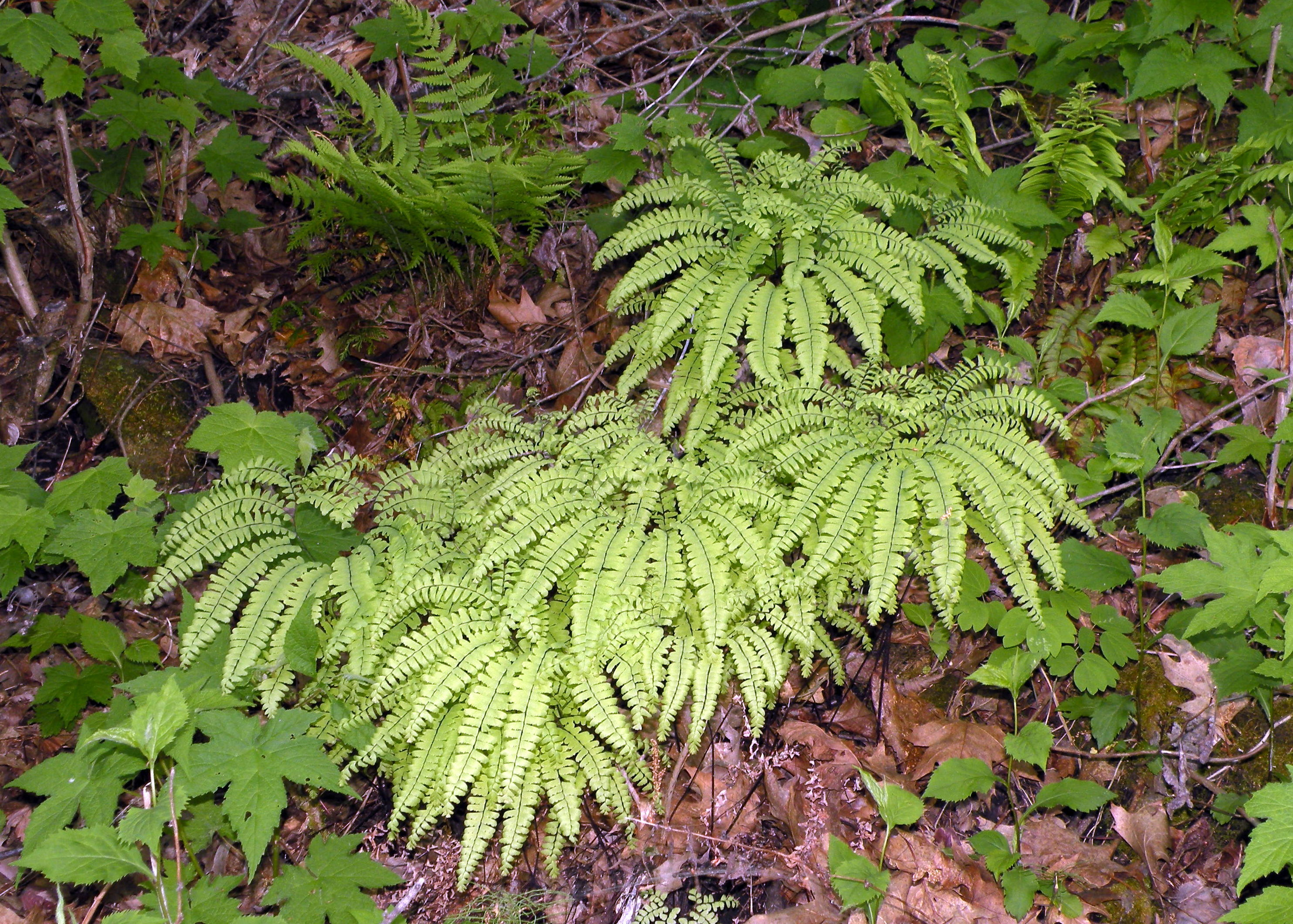
- Northern Maidenhair (Adiantum pedatum) in Willsboro, New York

Conservation status
- Secure (NatureServe)

Scientific classification
- Kingdom: Plantae
- Clade: Embryophytes
- Clade: Tracheophytes
- Division: Polypodiophyta
- Class: Polypodiopsida
- Order: Polypodiales
- Family: Pteridaceae
- Genus: Adiantum
- Species: A. pedatum

Binomial name
- Adiantum pedatum L.

Synonyms
- List: Adiantum americanum Nieuwl.; Adiantum boreale C.Presl, not validly publ.; Adiantum grandifolium Ching; Adiantum pedatum f. billingsae Kittr.; Adiantum pedatum var. glaucinum C.Chr., nom. illeg.; Adiantum pedatum var. kamtschaticum Rupr.; Adiantum pedatum f. laciniatum (Hopkins) Weath.; Adiantum pedatum var. lacinatum Hopkins; Adiantum pedatum var. originarium Wherry; Adiantum pedatum var. praeflexum Copel. ex C.F.Baker; Adiantum pedatum var. rangiferinum E.S.Burgess; Adiantum pedatum f. triangulare (McCord) M.Broun; Adiantum pedatum var. triangulare McCord; Adiantum pedatum var. tripartitum Farw.

= Adiantum pedatum =

Species of fern

Adiantum pedatum, the northern maidenhair fern, is a species of fern in the family Pteridaceae, native to moist forests in eastern North America. Like other ferns in the genus, the name maidenhair refers to the slender, shining black stipes. Taxonomy classification disputes occur due to the distribution of A. Pedatum in both North America and East Asia.

== Description ==
A. pedatum grows 30–75 cm (12–30 in) tall, and is deciduous. A. pedatum has clusters of spores on the underside of the leaf margins of the curved lobes. The key features of the northern maidenhair fern include fine, frilly fronds divided into curved stalks, reddish-brown stems, and crosiers that emerge pink in the spring. A. pedatum is the most northern species within the genus, found in higher latitudes and best grown in drained soil in shaded areas. The greatest issues with classifying the species occur within the A. pedatum group due to the variation of species recognition and large genetic diversity.

== Taxonomy ==
Adiantum pedatum was described by Linnaeus in Species Plantarum in 1753 (the official starting point of modern botanical nomenclature). He referred to earlier descriptions, all based on material from eastern North America. Linnaeus' own herbarium contains one specimen, collected by Pehr Kalm.

Specimens collected in Unalaska and Kodiak Island by Chamisso and Langsdorf were referred to as Adiantum boreale by Presl in 1836, although he did not provide a species description to accompany the name. Ruprecht, in 1845, called the Alaskan material A. pedatum var. aleuticum, and created var. kamtschaticum for material collected in Kamchatka by Carl Merck and Pallas. In 1857, E. J. Lowe noted that Wallich and Cantor had collected the species in northern India, and that material from the western United States ranged as far south as California. It was one of the many species cited by Asa Gray as disjunct between Japan and both the eastern and western United States. By 1874, Hooker & Baker reported it as present in both Japan and Manchuria.

A. pedatum is part of a group of similar species. The greatest issues with classifying the species occur within the group due to the variation of species recognition and large genetic diversity. Species that have been placed in the A. pedatum group include A. aleuticum and A. viridimontanum. A. pedatum also resembles species such as A. myriosorum. These all have fronds distinctively bifurcated and with pinnae on only one side.

Some subspecies have been recognized, but none are accepted by Plants of the World Online.

== Distribution and habitat ==
A. pedatum is the most northern species within the genus, occupying regions in Eastern Asia (EA) and North America (NA), and categorized by a disjunct distribution due to climate and geological occurrence. The EA-NA disjunction of A. pedatum is a focal point for botanists and is speculated to have occurred due to multiple geographic events.

Northern maidenhair fern grows best in shaded areas with humus-rich soil. Its preferred habitats are deciduous forests and at the base of rocky mountains when adequate moisture is present. Fern distribution occurs through spore dispersal via wind, and does not rely on biotic factors, so A. pedatum is more susceptible to abiotic factors such as changes in environmental conditions.

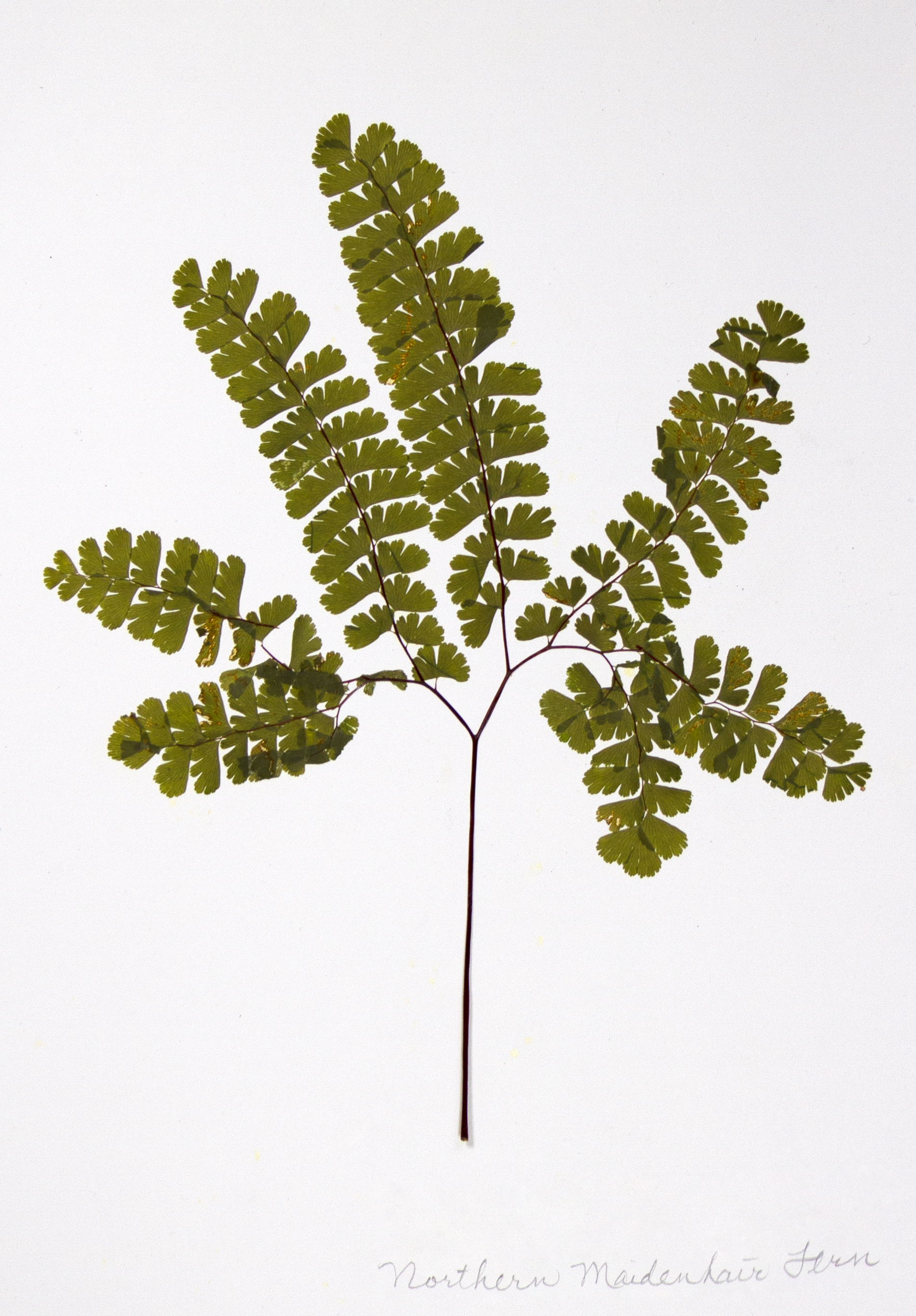
A. pedatum from herbarium.

== Similar species ==
A. pedatum in North America and Eastern Asia have almost no morphological differences. Botanists have begun to distinguish A. pedatum found in North America from A. japonica and Chinese A. pedatum found in Eastern Asia because of differences in genetic makeup. The North American Adiantum includes chromosome base number 29, while the East Asian species include base number 29 and base number 30.

The classification of A. pedatum affects whether the species is interpreted as a disjunct distribution, so there is currently conflicting research. The species included in the Adiantum complex include A. pedatum, A. aleuticum, A. viridimontanum, and A. myriosorum.

== Life history ==
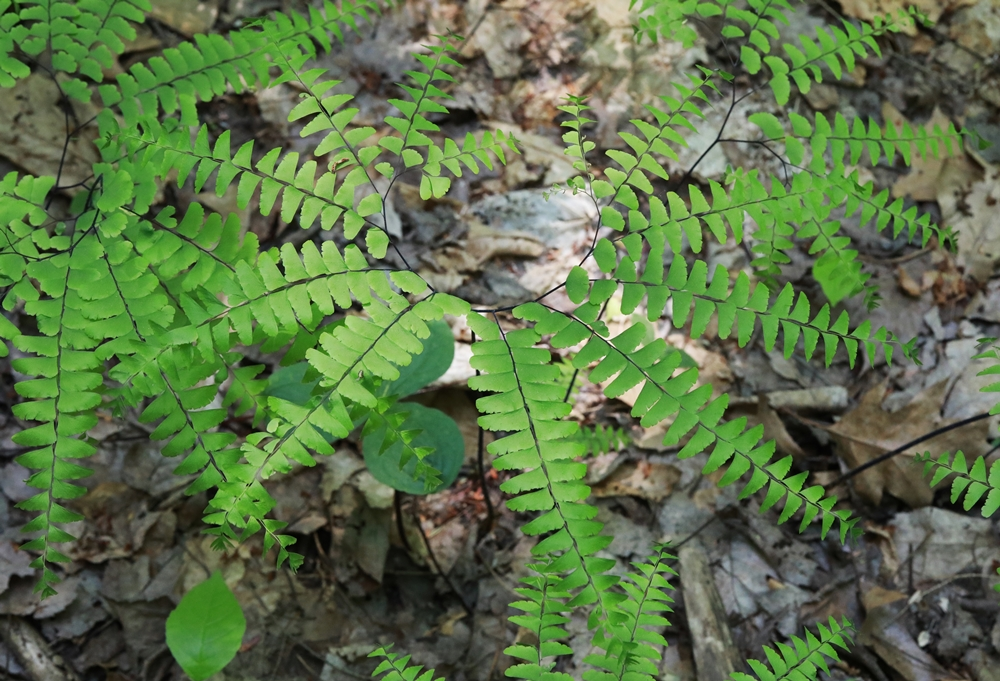
Northern maidenhair fern.

A. pedatum is a spore-producing, woody flowering plant. The reproductive stages of ferns include the spore, gametophyte, sporeling, and sporophyte stages. Compared to other species of ferns, A. pedatumcontains a high amount of fertile plants and produces a significant amount of spores for dispersal. Long-distance dispersal is inferred to have occurred in the past.

Limitations in A. pedatum include spore production, retention and release. There are continuing life history traits that affect reproduction including gametophyte establishment, persistence, sexual status, selecting for self-fertilization or outcrossing, and new sporophyte establishment.

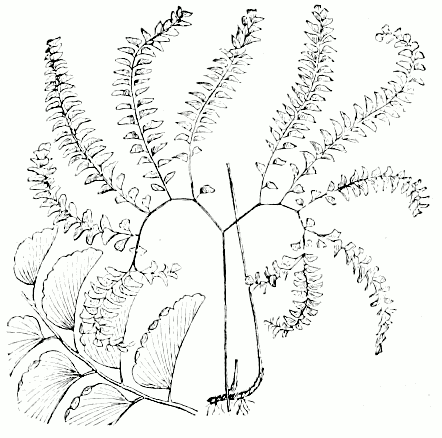
Artistic rendering of northern maidenhair fern.

Evolutionary changes including the duplication of gene loci, the occurrence of multivalence in meiotic sporocytes, and a limited geographic distribution all contribute toward the recent origin of the tetraploid in A. pedatum.

== Research focus ==
Research on A. pedatum focuses on the potential as anti-cancer, anti-oxidant and anti-inflammatory agents. There have been studies that found potential protective effects against colon cancer in A. pedatum.

== Bibliography ==
- Linnaeus, C. (1753). Species Plantarum. Vol. II. Stockholm: Laurentii Salvii.
