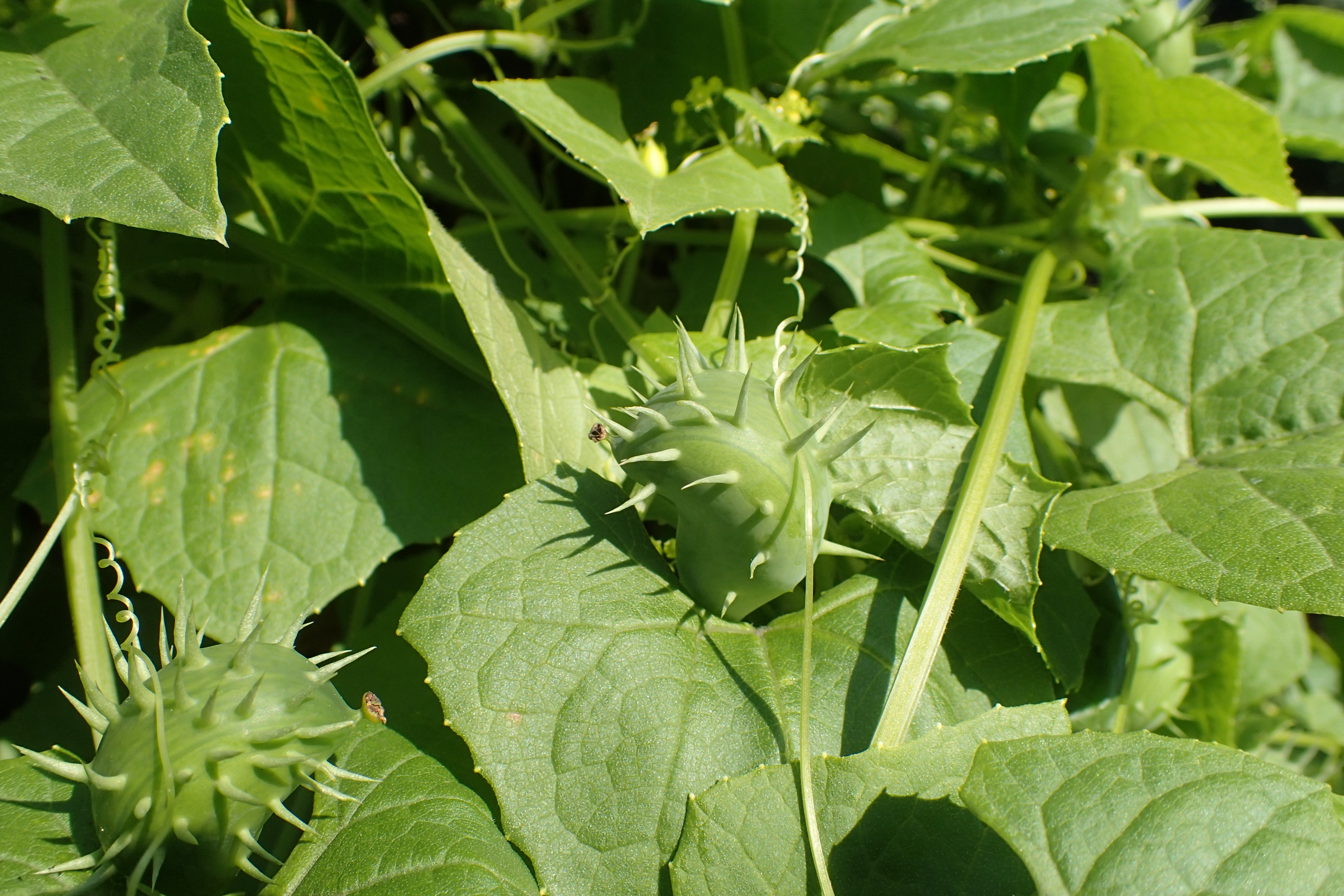
- Foliage and fruit (cultivated)

Scientific classification
- Kingdom: Plantae
- Clade: Tracheophytes
- Clade: Angiosperms
- Clade: Eudicots
- Clade: Rosids
- Order: Cucurbitales
- Family: Cucurbitaceae
- Genus: Cyclanthera
- Species: C. brachystachya

Binomial name
- Cyclanthera brachystachya (DC.) Cogn.

Synonyms
- Cyclanthera explodens Naudin

= Cyclanthera brachystachya =

Exploding cucumber

Species of flowering plant

Cyclanthera brachystachya, the exploding cucumber (but not to be confused with Ecballium elaterium), in the cucurbit or gourd family (Cucurbitaceae), is a herbaceous vine usually grown for its curiosity value, but the fruit is also edible.

Exploding cucumber (Cyclanthera explodens) in slow motion

== Distribution ==
It is native from Guatemala south to Venezuela, Colombia and Ecuador.

== Description ==
It is a scrambling or trailing annual plant growing up to 3 m long, with hairless stems. The leaves are 5–10 cm diameter, with three or five lobes, and a 3 cm petiole. The unusual fruit are 2–4 cm long, curved but bilaterally symmetrical, bulbous and spiny; they explode when ripe to disperse the 7–9 mm wide seeds. The plant is monoecious, producing both male and female flowers on the same plant in mid-summer.

== Cultivation ==
It is propagated by its puzzle-piece-shaped seed, and grown in conditions similar to other cucurbits like cucumbers and melons. It prefers warm to hot climates with regular watering. Once established the vine can grow quickly up to 3–5 m. Although preferably grown over some kind of support, it can also be grown along the ground.

=== Food uses ===
The fruit can be used raw when small (less than 2 cm) in salads, or cooked when mature (2.5 cm, exploded).

== Photos ==
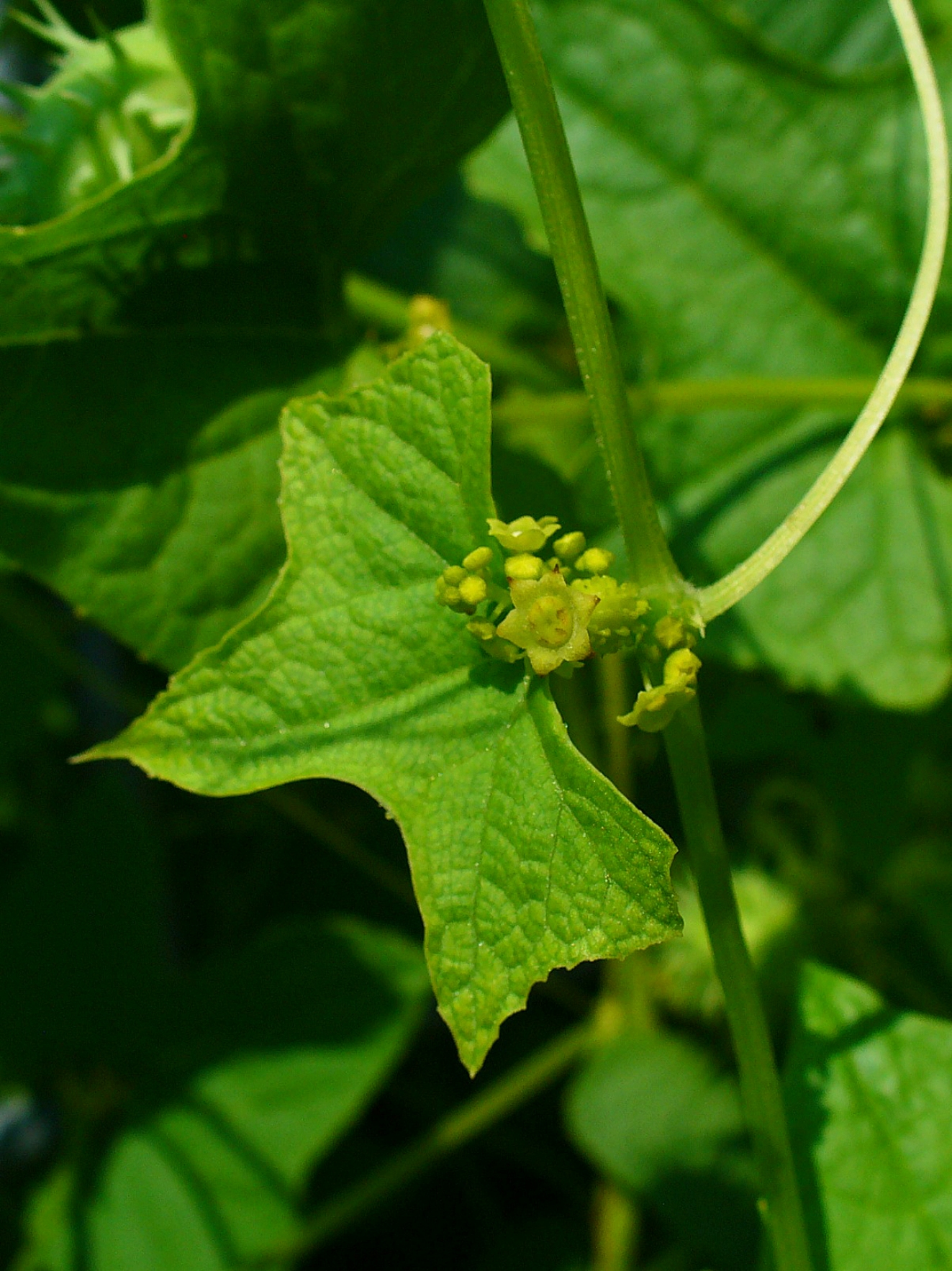

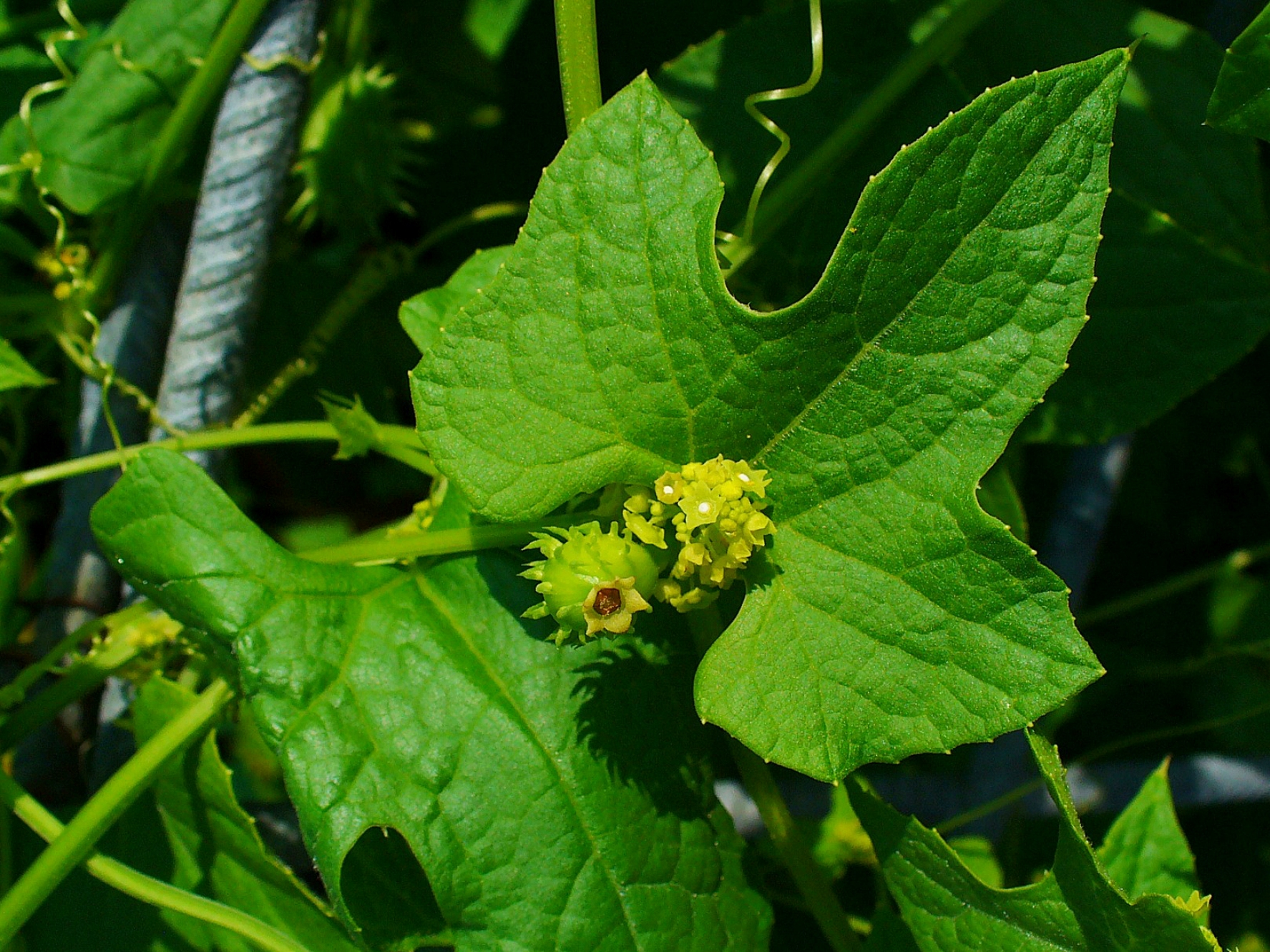

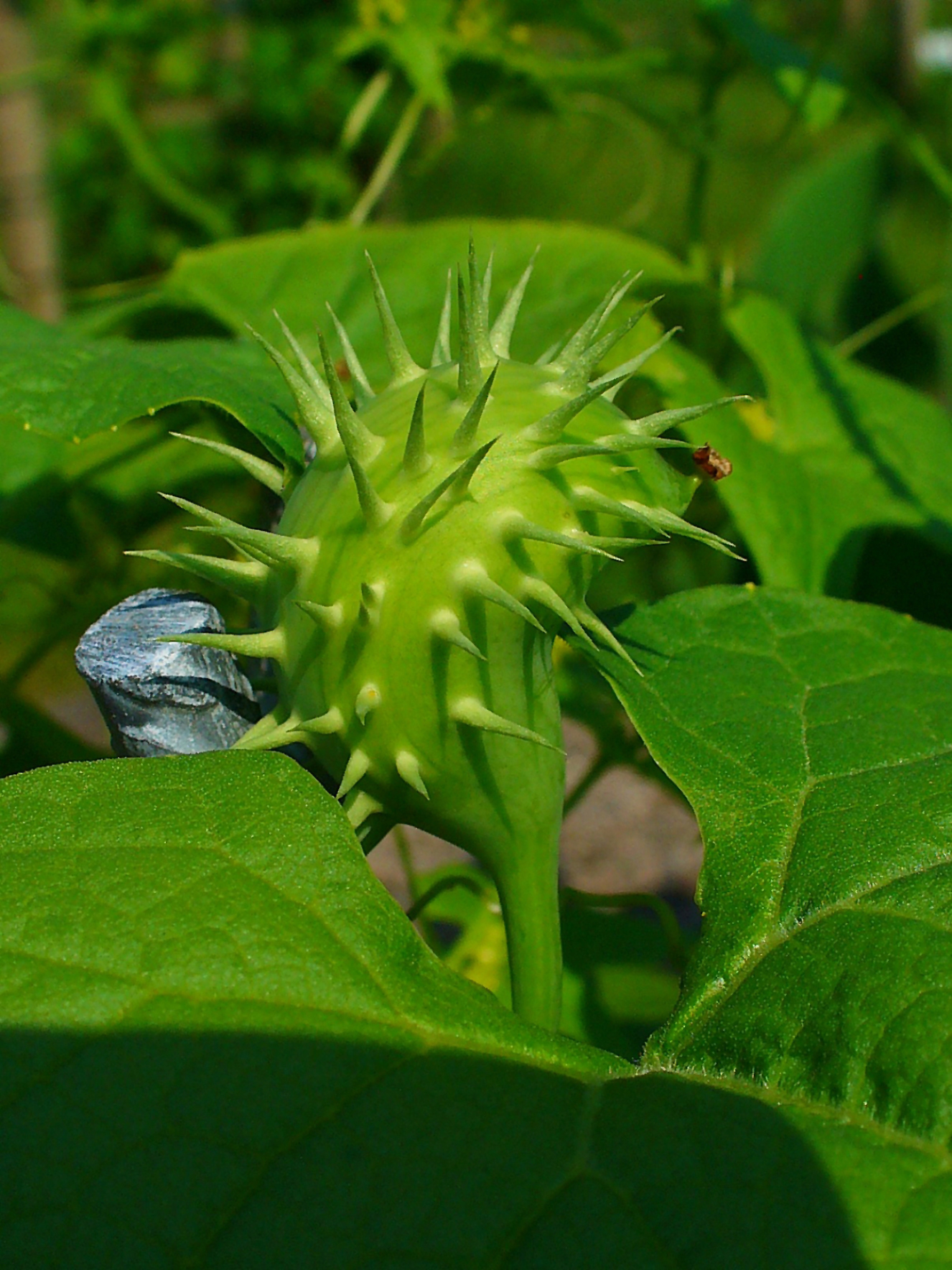

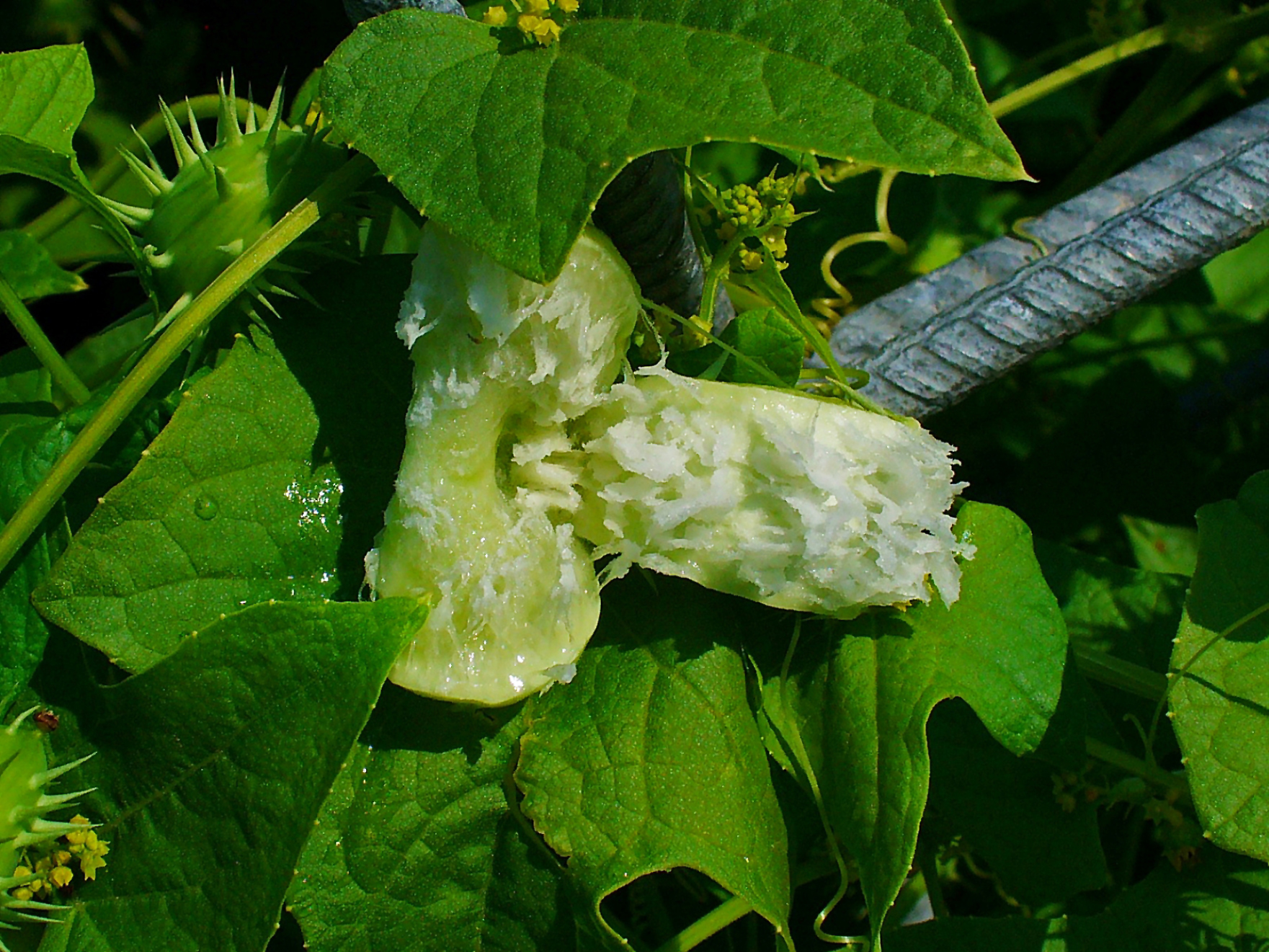

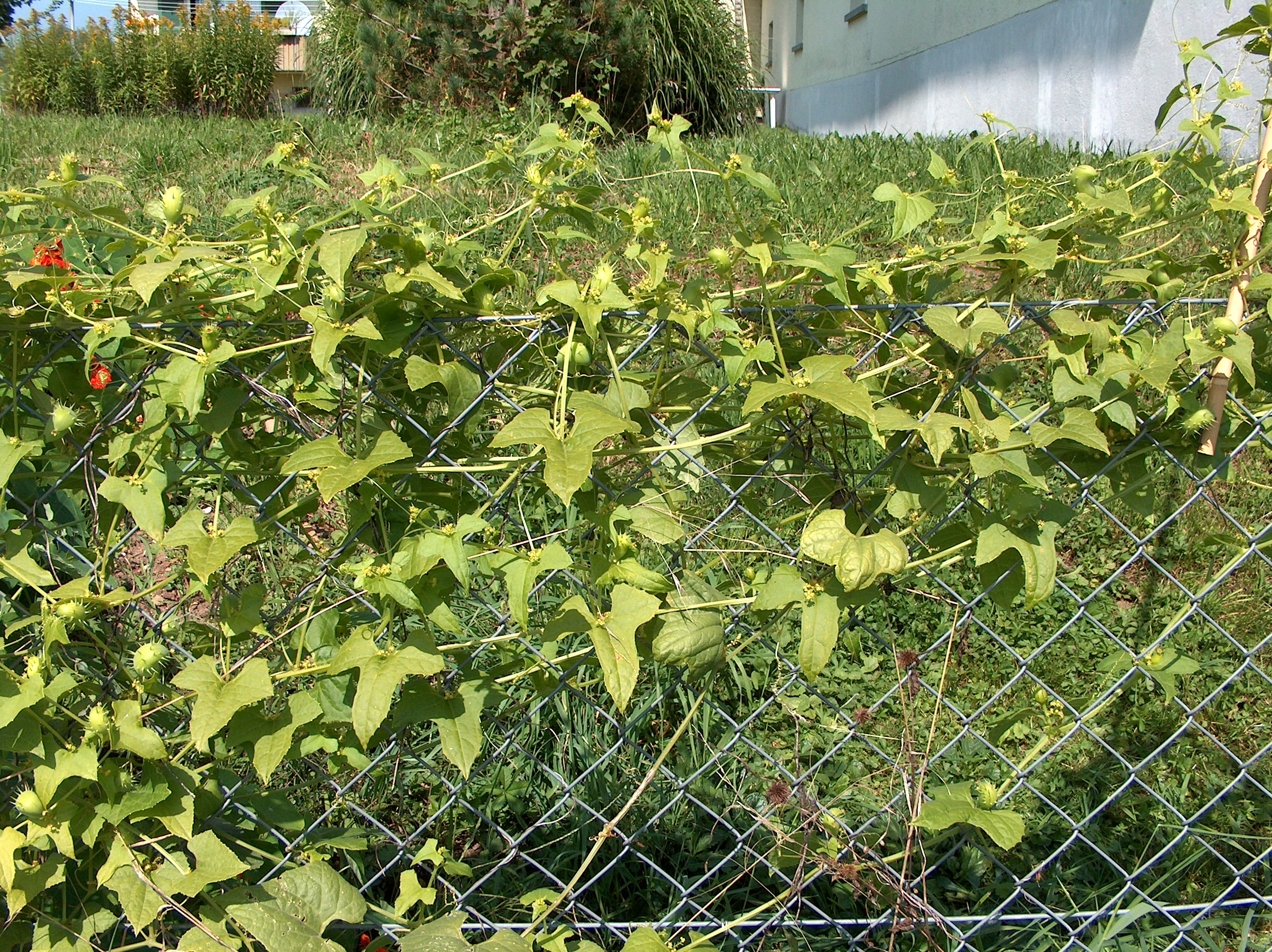
Plant

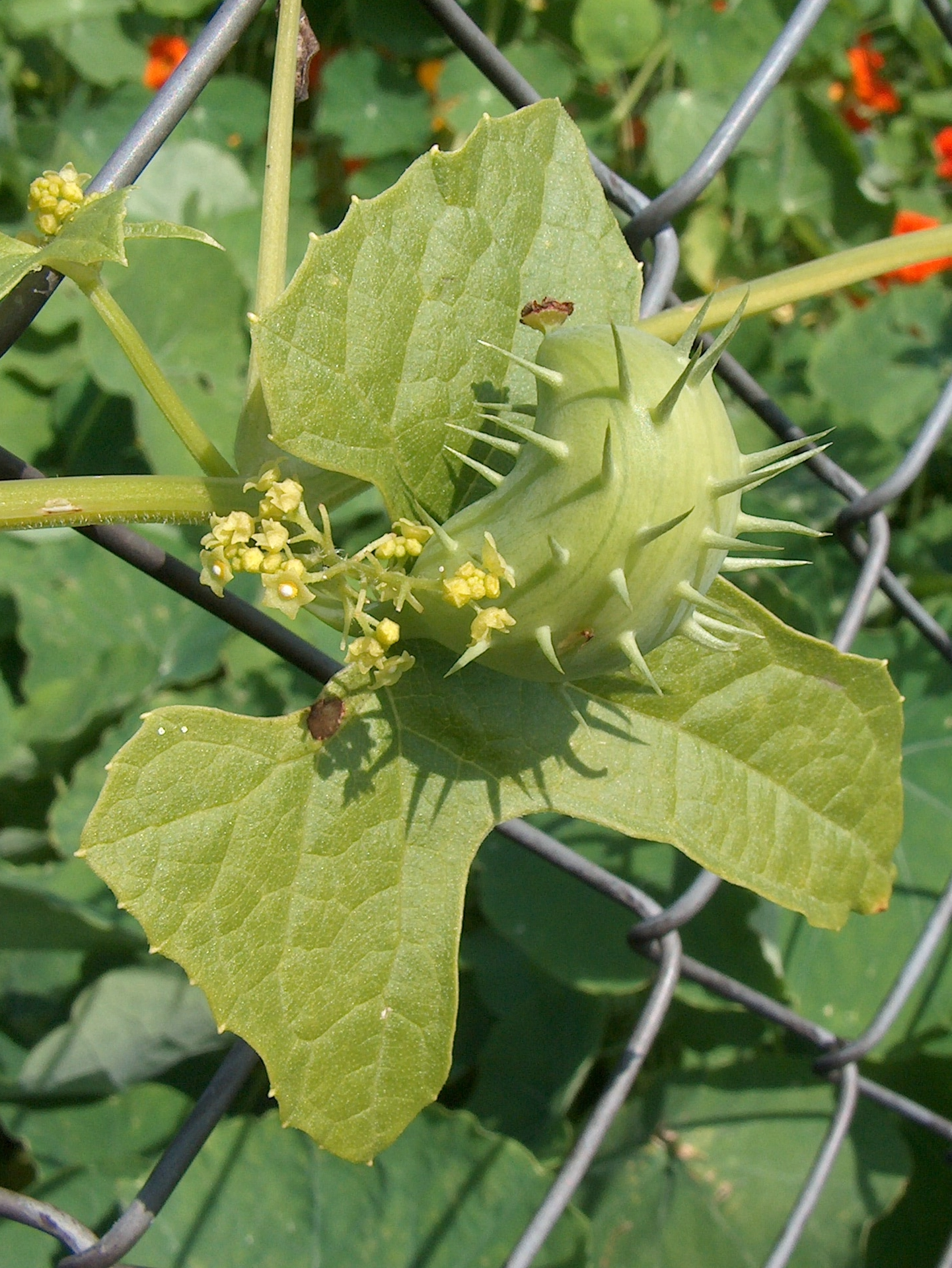
Fruit

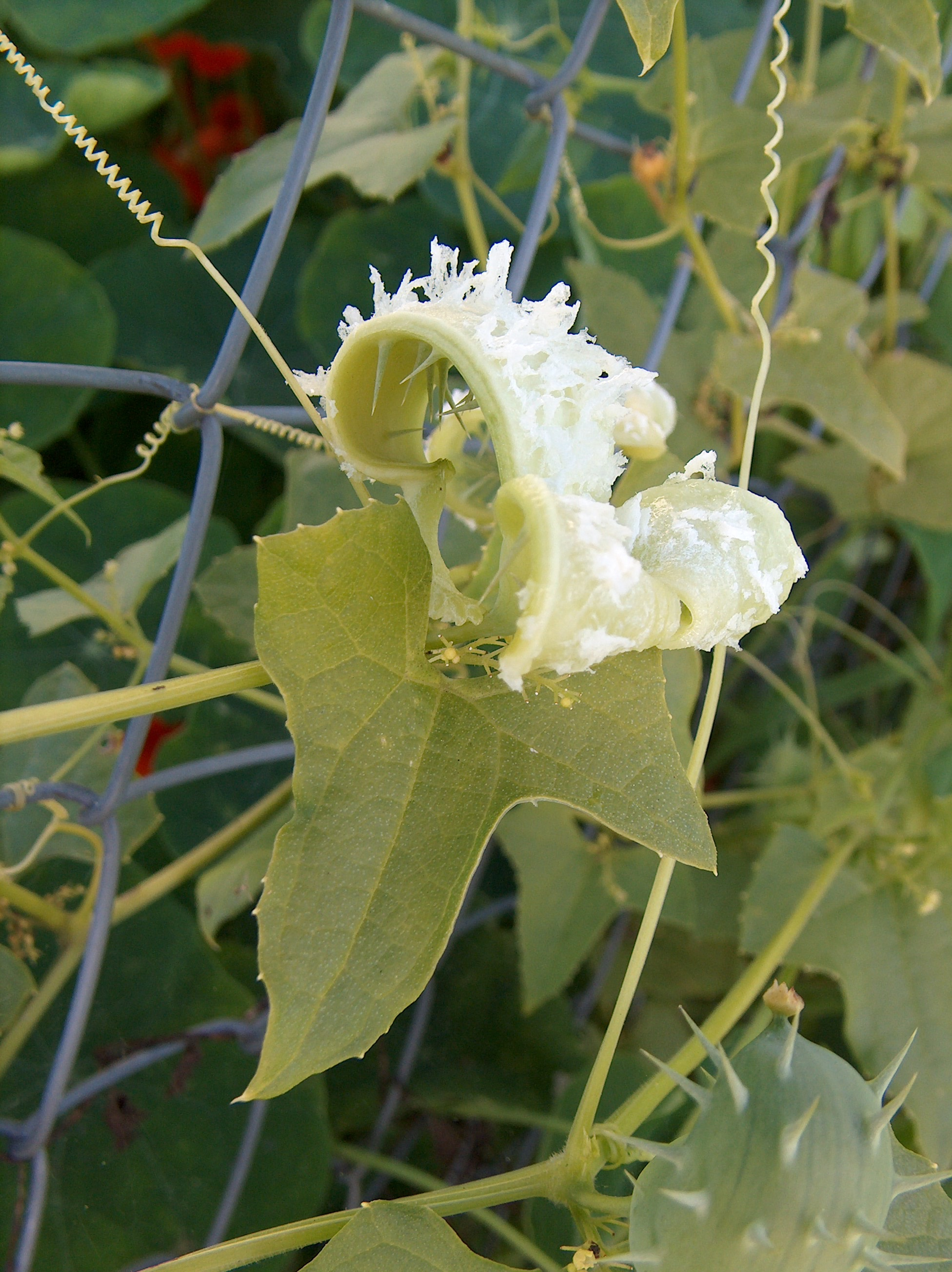
exploded fruit

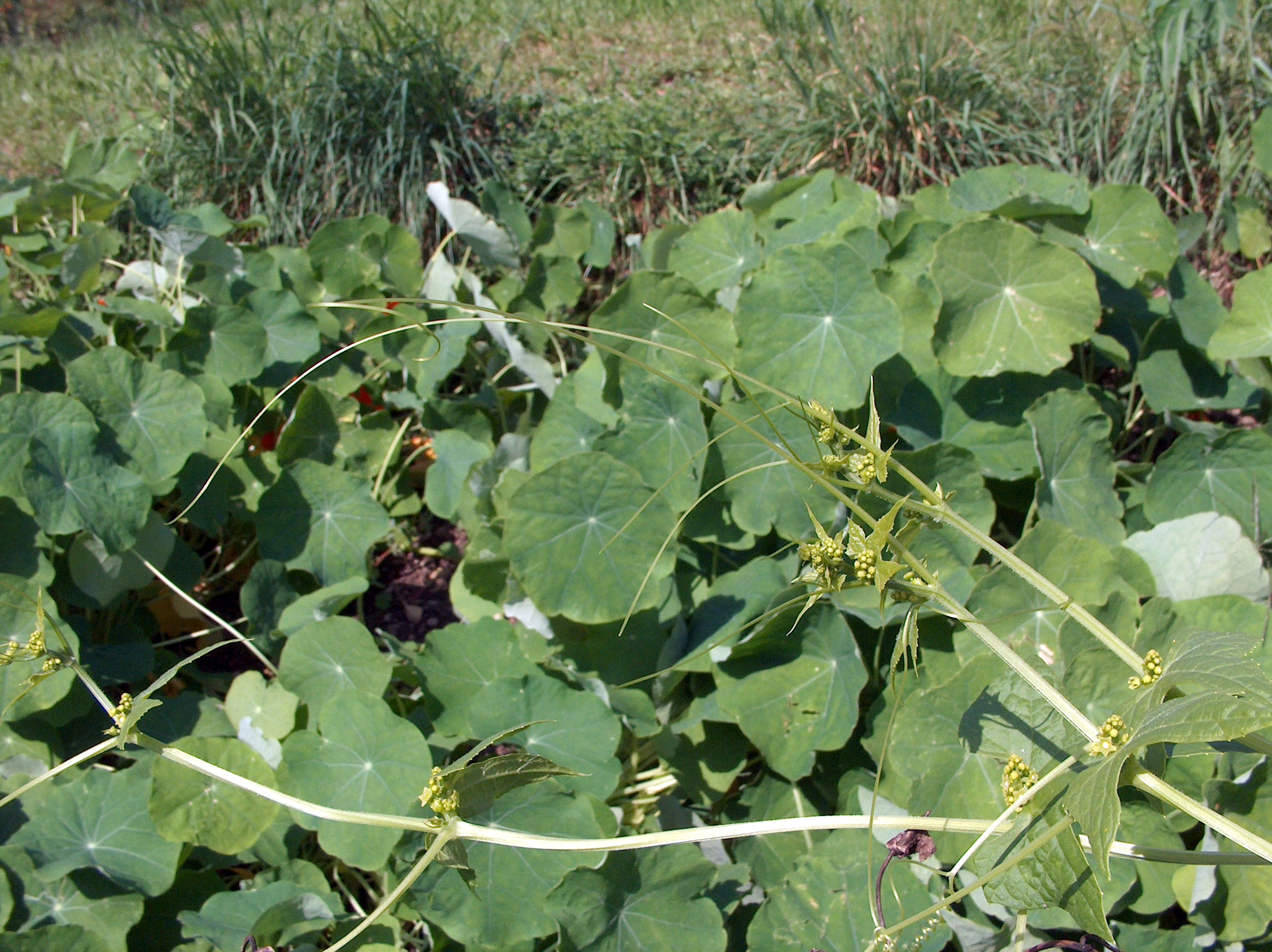
Shoot

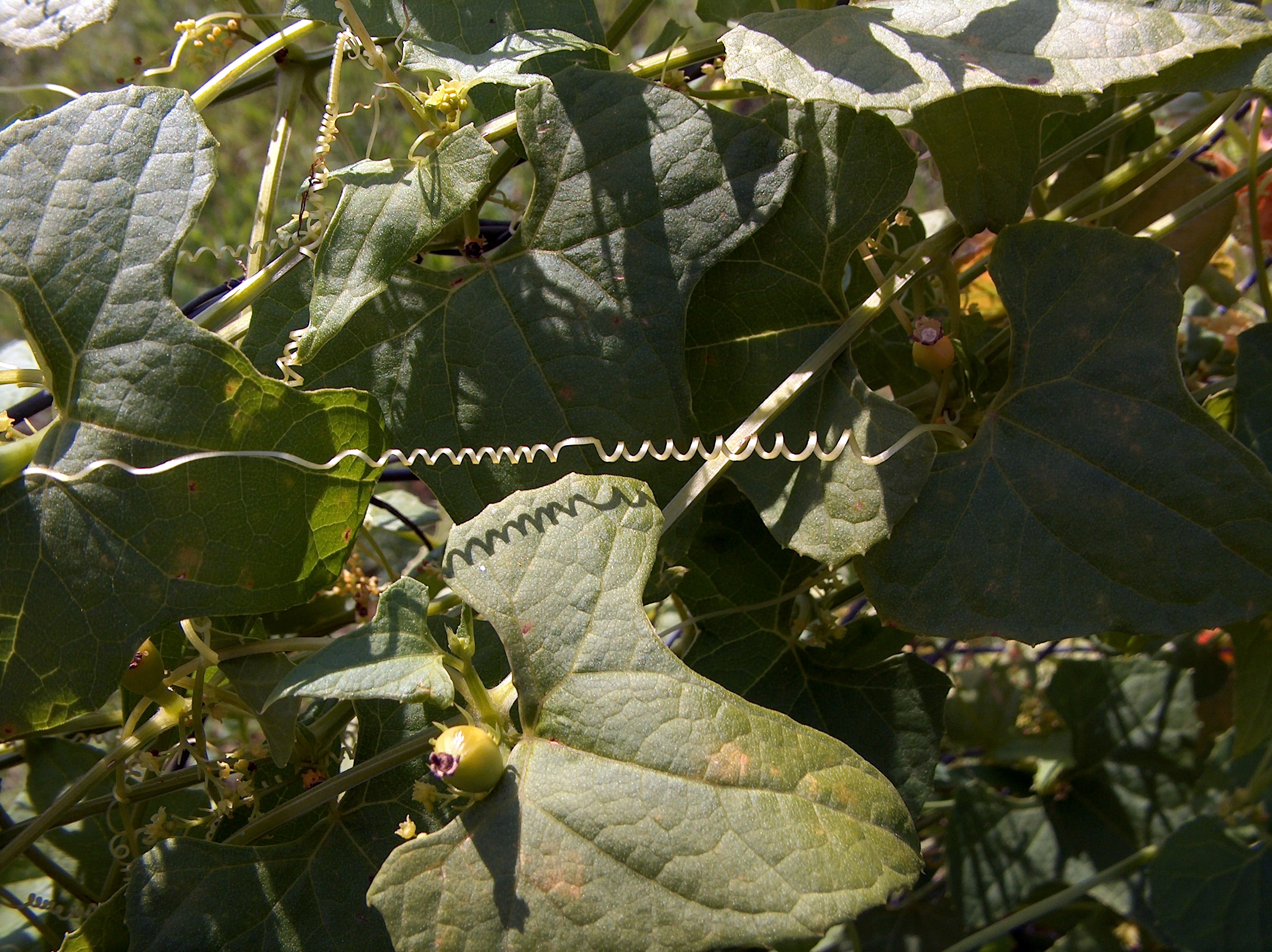
Tendril

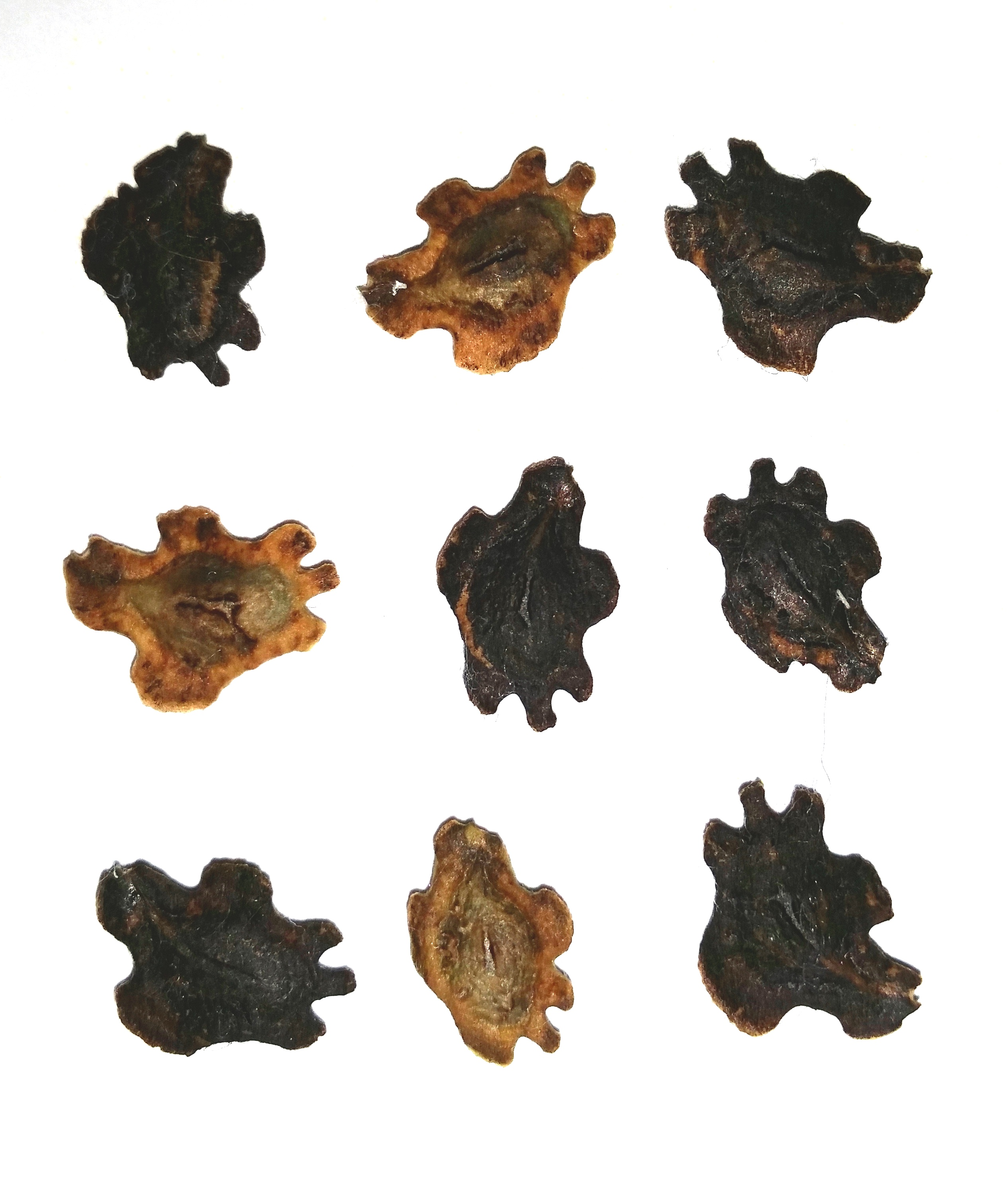
Seeds

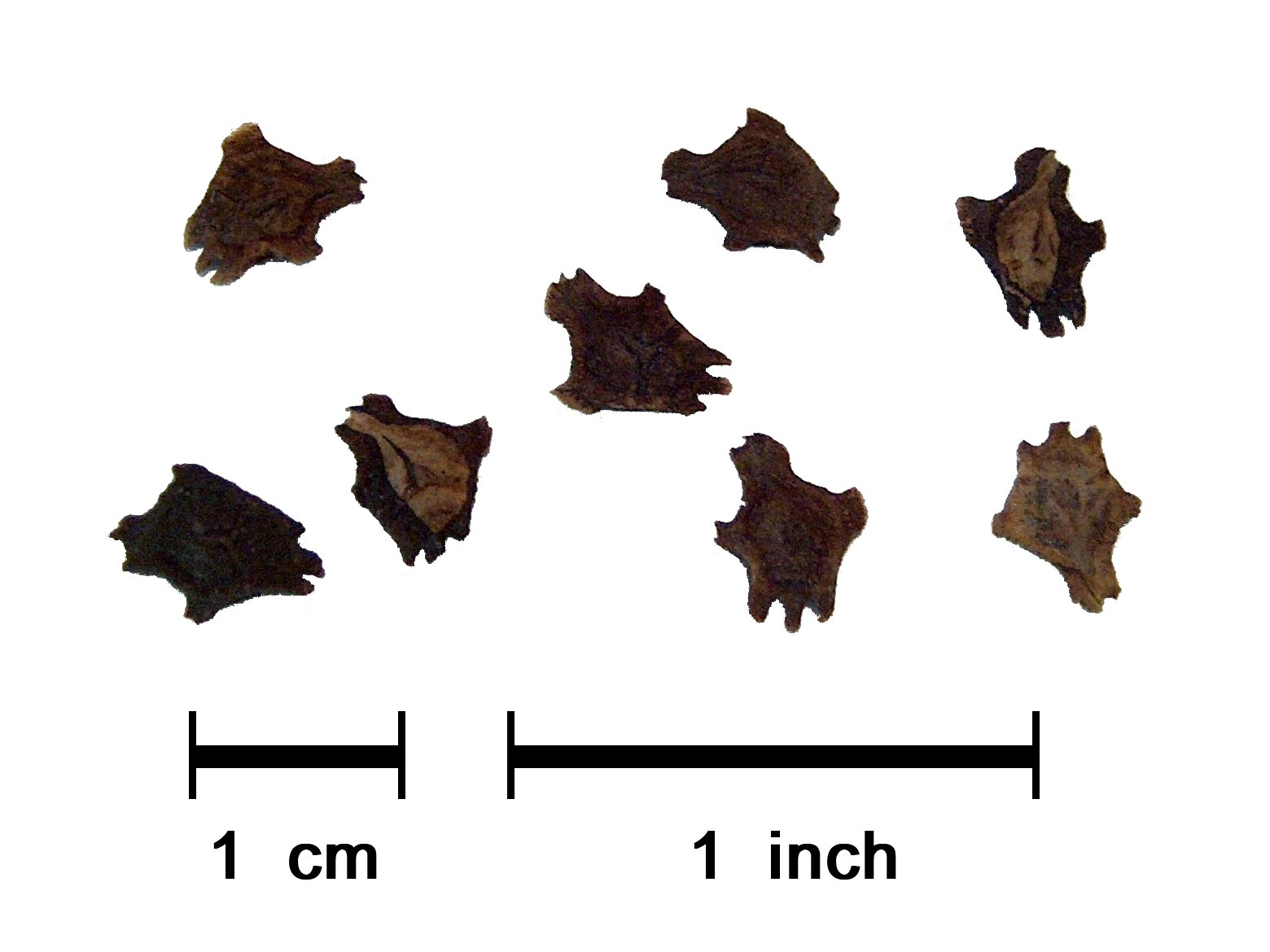
Seeds
