= Franz Josef Ruprecht =

Austrian-Russian medical doctors and botanist (1814–1870)

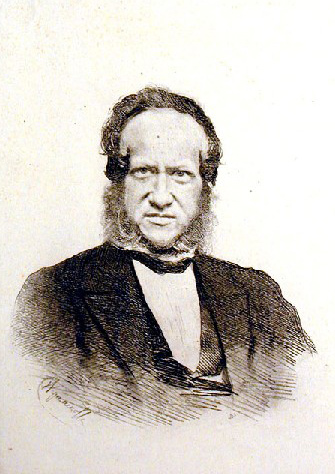
- Born: 1 November 1814; Freiburg im Breisgau
- Died: 4 April 1870 (aged 55); Saint Petersburg, Russian Empire
- Scientific career
- Author abbrev. (botany): Rupr.

Franz Josef Ruprecht (1 November 1814 – 4 April 1870) was an Austrian-born medical doctors and botanist active in the Russian Empire, where he was known as Frants Ivanovič Ruprekht (Russian: Франц Ива́нович Ру́прехт).

== Life ==
He was born in Freiburg im Breisgau, and grew up in Prague, where he studied, and graduated as Doctor of Medicine in 1836. After a short period in medical practice in Prague, he was appointed curator of the herbarium of the Russian Academy of Sciences in Saint Petersburg in 1839.

In July and August 1841, together with a colleague, professor Sawelhaw of the Russian Academy, he organised and accompanied an expedition to the island to Kolguyev Island in the Barents Sea.

He served as assistant director of the Saint Petersburg Botanical Garden between 1851 and 1855, and professor of botany in 1855 at the University of Saint Petersburg. He died in Saint Petersburg in 1870.

He described many new plants collected in the Russian Far East, including Alaska, then under Russian rule; examples include Adiantum aleuticum, Lonicera maackii, and Phellodendron amurense.

== Memorials ==
The genus Ruprechtia is named after him.

== Publications ==
- Ruprecht, F. J. Symbolae ad historiam et geographiam plantarum Rossicarum, Saint Petersburg in 1846
- Ruprecht, F. J. Flora Caucasi, P. 1. Saint Petersburg 1869
- Postels, A., Ruprecht, F.J. Illustrationes algarum, Weinheim, J. Cramer 1963
- Ruprecht, F. J. Flora ingrica (flora of the Leningrad region).

== Sources ==
- "Рупрехт, Франц" . Brockhaus and Efron Encyclopedic Dictionary (in Russian). 1906.
- Extensive biography on Allg. Deutsche Biographie
- Fedotova A.A. The Origins of the Russian Chernozem Soil (Black Earth): Franz Joseph Ruprecht's ‘Geo-Botanical Researches into the Chernozem’ of 1866]], Environment and History, 16 (2010): 271–293
