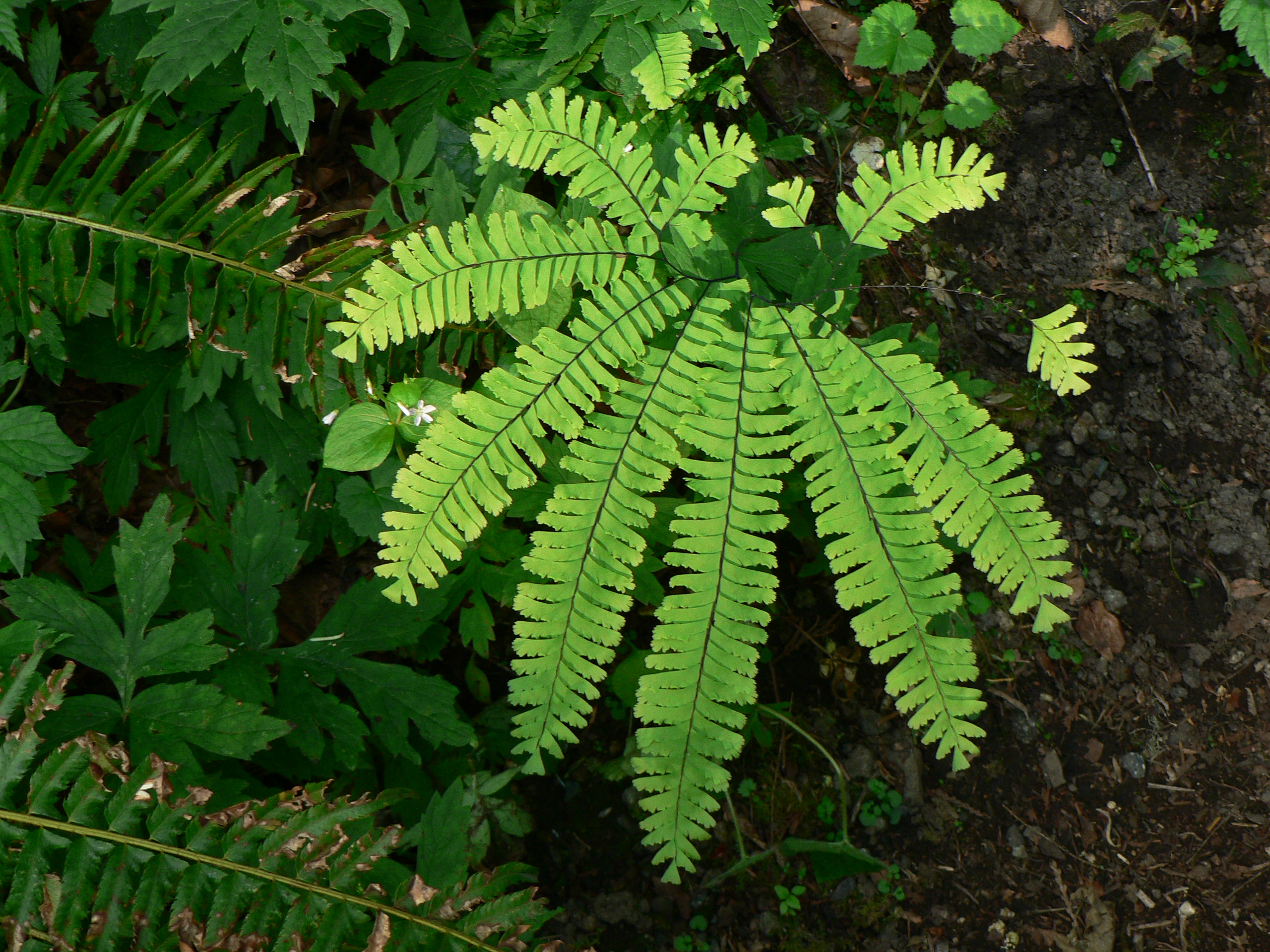
- Western maidenhair (Adiantum aleuticum)

Conservation status
- Secure (NatureServe)

Scientific classification
- Kingdom: Plantae
- Clade: Tracheophytes
- Division: Polypodiophyta
- Class: Polypodiopsida
- Order: Polypodiales
- Family: Pteridaceae
- Genus: Adiantum
- Species: A. aleuticum

Binomial name
- Adiantum aleuticum (Rupr.) C.A.Paris

Subspecies
- Adiantum aleuticum subsp. aleuticum; Adiantum aleuticum subsp. subpumilum (W.H.Wagner) Lellinger

Synonyms
- Adiantum pedatum L. subsp. aleuticum (Rupr.) Piper & Beattie; Adiantum pedatum L. subsp. aleuticum (Rupr.) Calder & Roy L.Taylor, nom. illeg. superfl.; Adiantum pedatum L. var. aleuticum Rupr.; Adiantum pedatum L. subsp. calderi Cody; Adiantum pedatum L. var. praeflexum Copel. ex C.F.Baker, nom. nud.; Adiantum pedatum L. var. rangiferinum E.S.Burgess

= Adiantum aleuticum =

Western maidenhair fern

Species of fern

Adiantum aleuticum, the western maidenhair fern or Aleutian maidenhair, is a species of deciduous fern in the genus Adiantum.

== Description ==
A. aleuticum typically grows about 18-30 inches tall and wide. The fronds grow 6–10 in (15–25 cm) tall, and are fan-shaped, light to medium green with dark brown to black stems. When growing in relative shade, fronds are held horizontally, but it also can grow in high mountains in full sun (often on serpentine rock) with fronds held vertically. New fronds unfurl from a tight coil (circinate vernation) held on a tall stalk. Oblong sori (masses of spores) form beneath a curled-under leaflet edge (false indusium).

== Taxonomy ==
Formerly classified as A. pedatum var. aleuticum, it was shown to be a separate species in 1991.

Other common names include serpentine maidenhair and five-fingered fern.

== Distribution and habitat ==
Adiantum aleuticum is native mainly to western North America from the Aleutian Islands of Alaska, south to Chihuahua, and also locally in northeastern North America from Newfoundland south to Vermont. It prefers fertile, moist soil in rock crevices near streams, from sea level in the north of its range, up to 3,200 m altitude in the south of its range. It tolerates serpentinite rock well, and is confined to this mineral-rich rock in some areas. When growing on sunny serpentine talus and bedrock, the fronds are held vertically, giving the fern a rather different general appearance.

== Cultivation ==
The species and its cultivar 'Subpumilum' have gained the Royal Horticultural Society's Award of Garden Merit. Though hardy they may also be grown as houseplants. They prefer low to medium light, and will grow in moist potting mix. They may prove difficult to keep alive in dry climates.

== Etymology ==
Adiantum is derived from Greek and means 'unwetted'. This name is in reference to the fact that its leaves do not become saturated, even when they are submerged in water. In the US, they are suitable for USDA hardiness zones 3–8.

Aleuticum means 'from the Aleutian Islands'.

== Cultivars ==
Cultivars include:

- 'Japonicum'
- 'Imbricatum'
- 'Subpumilum'

== Gallery ==
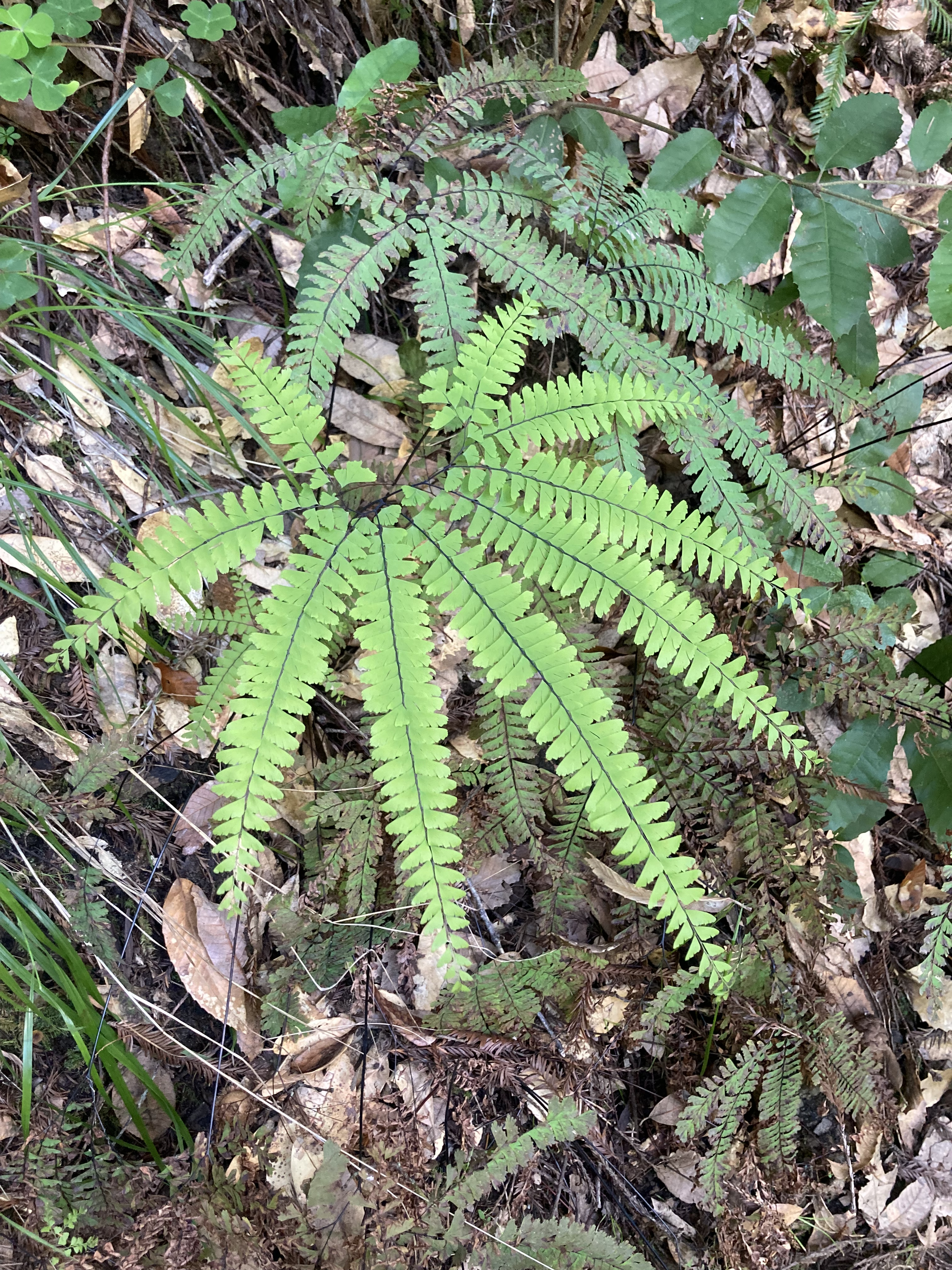
Palmate, not typical pinnate leaf shape common to many ferns

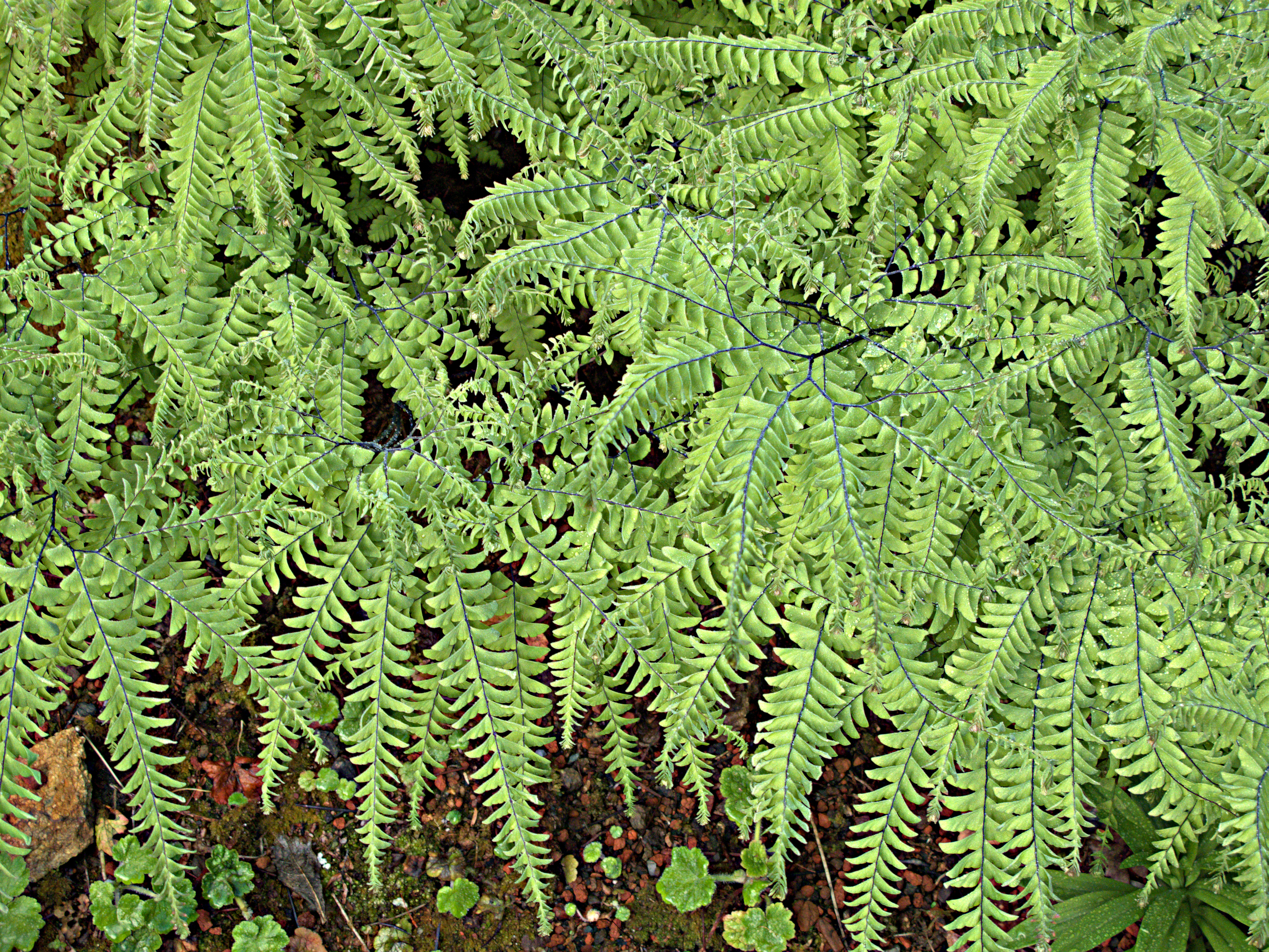
Tilden Regional Park California

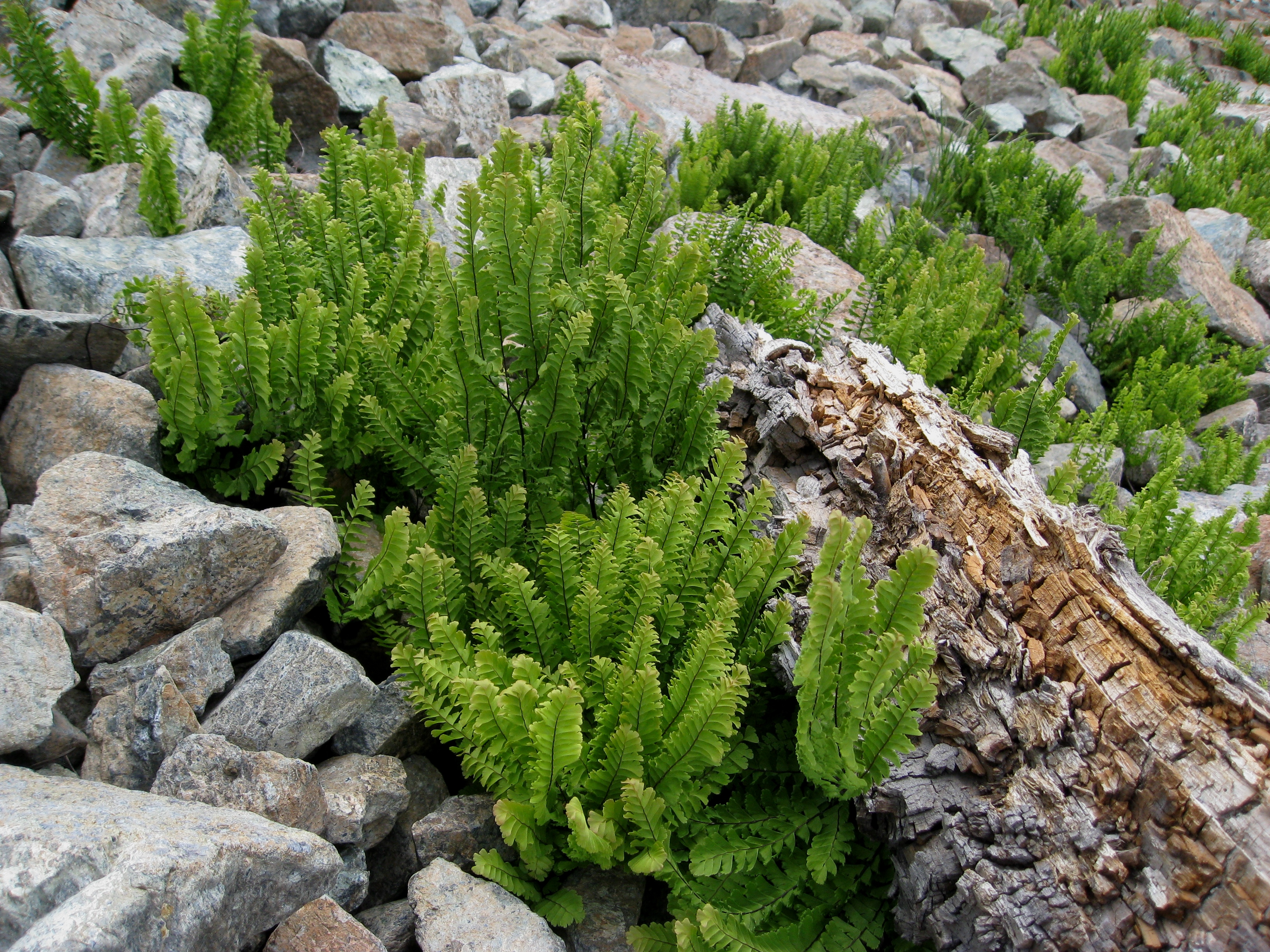
growing on serpentine rock

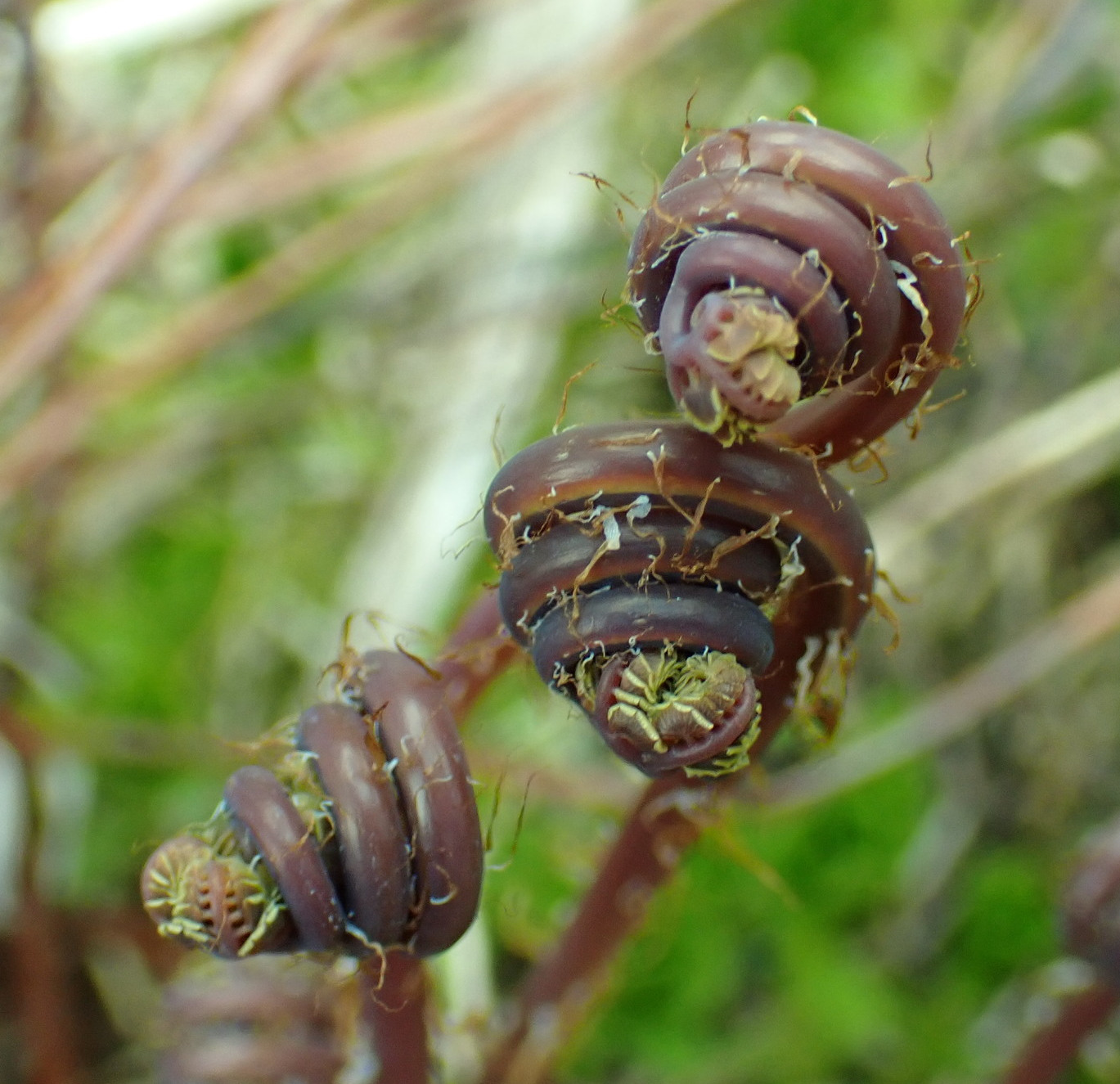
new fronds unfolding

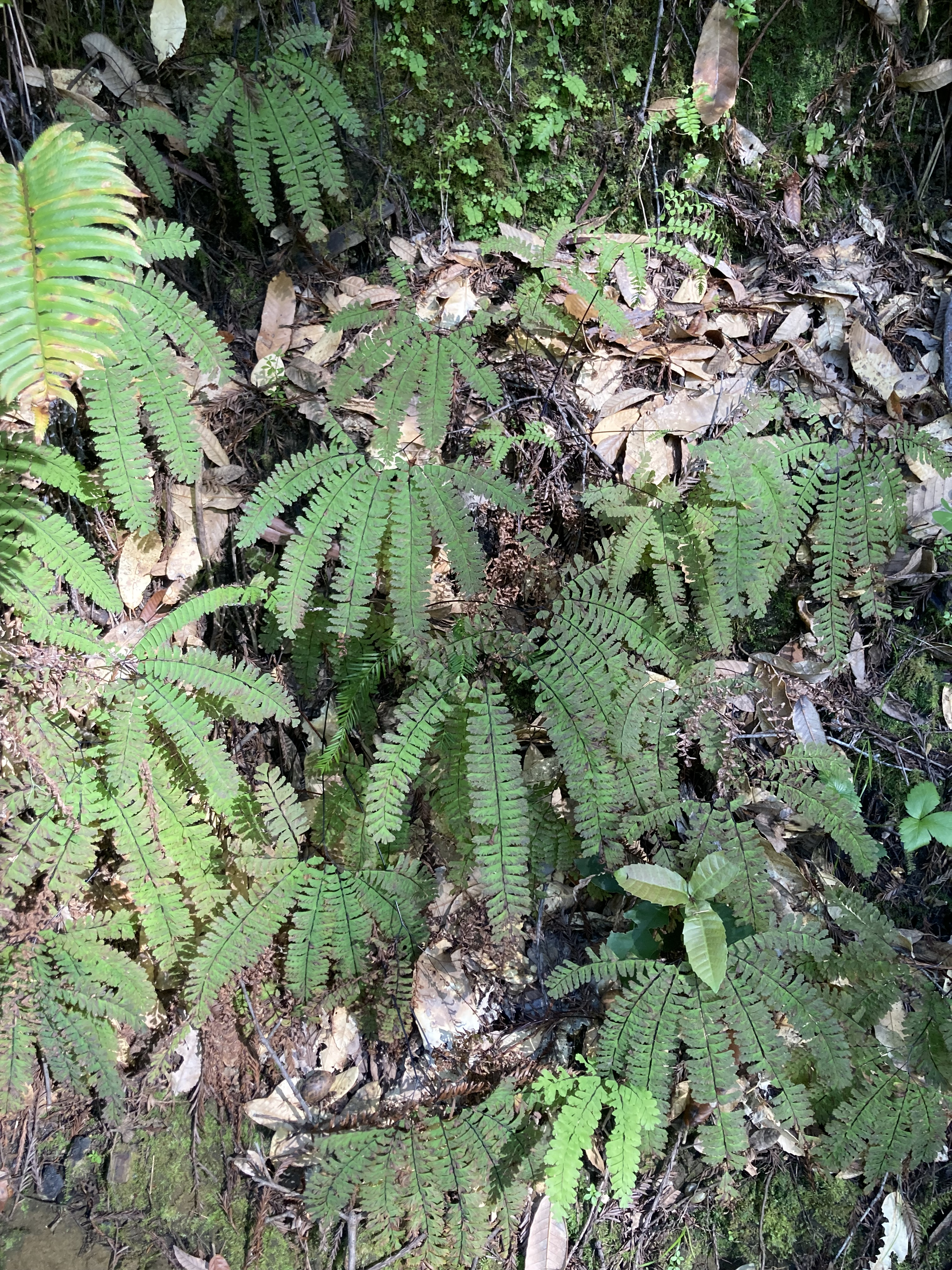
In the undergrowth at the Forest of Nisene Marks Regional park.

== See also ==
- Adiantum pedatum (five-fingered fern)
