= Pedate =

Biological structure that resembles feet

In biology, a pedate structure is a structure that resembles feet, or has a quality of feet. It derives from the Latin verb "pedo", meaning "to furnish with feet".

== Plants ==
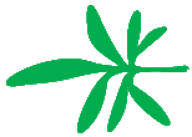
A pedately divided leaf.

Botanically, the term is used to describe compound leaves, veins, or other structures, where the divisions of that structure arise from a central point (as in a palmate structure), but the lateral divisions are further cleft in two. More broadly, it can be used to describe a compound leaf with a terminal leaflet and branching axes to either side which curve outward and backward, to which leaflets are attached on the outer side of the curve.

== Animals ==
In animals, the term "pedate" is used to mean "having feet," a sense that includes the tube feet of echinoderms as well as the vertebrate foot.
