= Ecology of Bermuda =

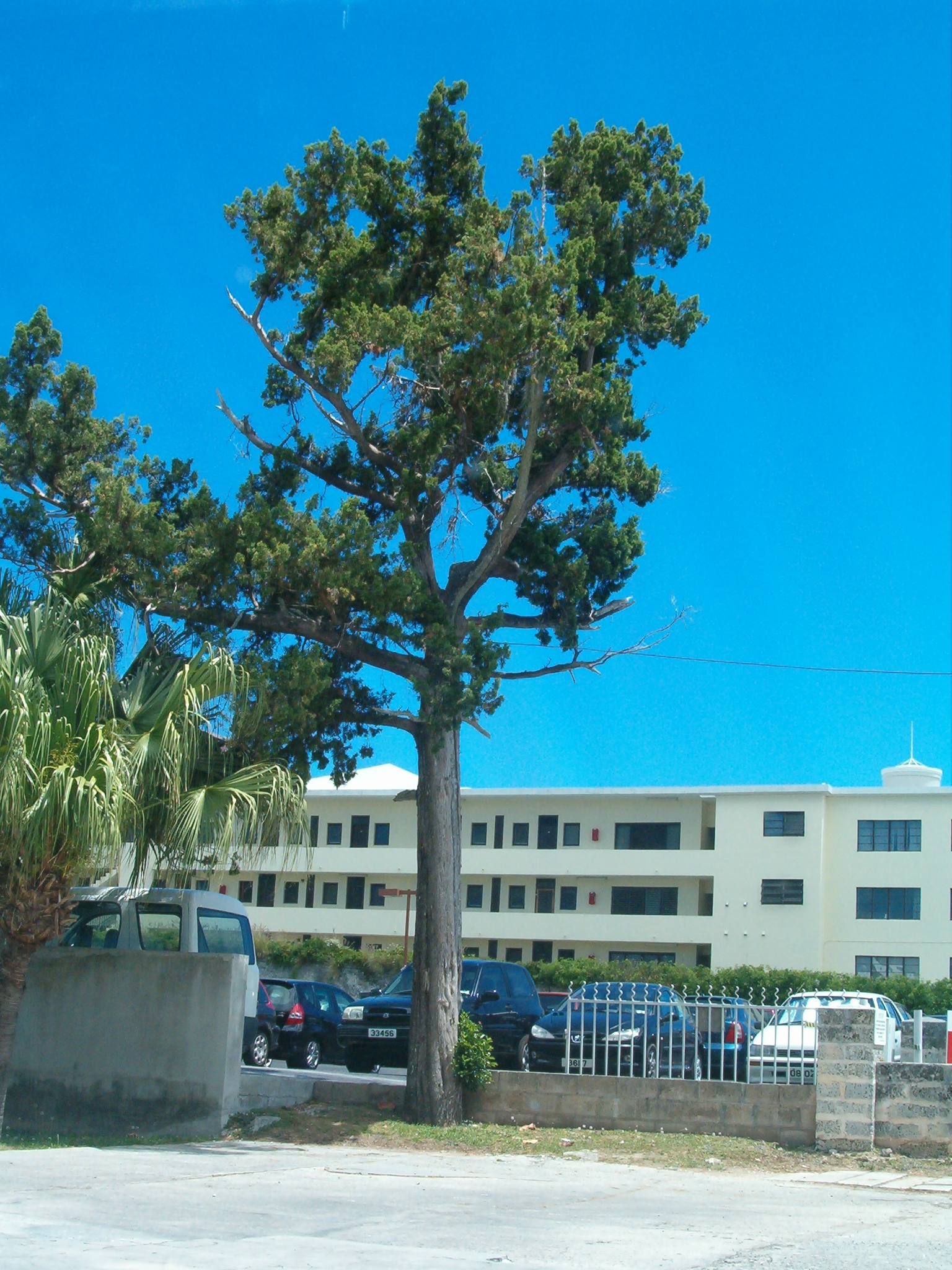
Bermuda cedar on the outskirts of Hamilton.

Bermuda's ecology has an abundance of unique flora and fauna due to the island's isolation from the mainland of North America. The wide range of endemic species and the islands form a distinct ecoregion, the Bermuda subtropical conifer forests. The variety of species found both on land and in the waters surrounding Bermuda have varying positive and negative impacts on the ecosystem of the island, depending on the species. There are varying biotic and abiotic factors that have threatened and continue to threaten the island's ecology. There are, however, also means of conservation that can be used to mitigate these threats.

== Setting ==
Located 1,040 km (645 mi.) off the American East Coast, Bermuda is a crescent-shaped chain of 184 islands and islets that were once the rim of a volcano. The islands are slightly hilly rather than having steep cliffs, with the highest point being 79 m. The coast has many bays and inlets, with sandy beaches especially on the south coasts. Bermuda has a semi-tropical climate, warmed by the Gulf Stream current. Bermuda is very densely populated. Twenty of the islands are inhabited.

Wildlife that could fly to the island or were carried there by winds and currents formed the species. There are no native mammals other than bats, and only two reptiles, but there are large numbers of birds, plants, and insects. Once on the island, organisms had to adapt to local conditions, such as the humid climate, lack of fresh water, frequent storms, and salt spray. The area of the islands shrank as water levels rose at the end of the Pleistocene epoch, and fewer species were able to survive in the reduced land-area. Nearly 8,000 different species of flora and fauna are known from the islands of Bermuda. The number is likely to be considerably higher if microorganisms, cave-dwellers and deep-sea species were counted.

Today the variety of species on Bermuda has been greatly increased by introductions, both deliberate and accidental. Many of these introduced species have posed a threat to the native flora and fauna because of competition and interference with habitat.

== Plants ==
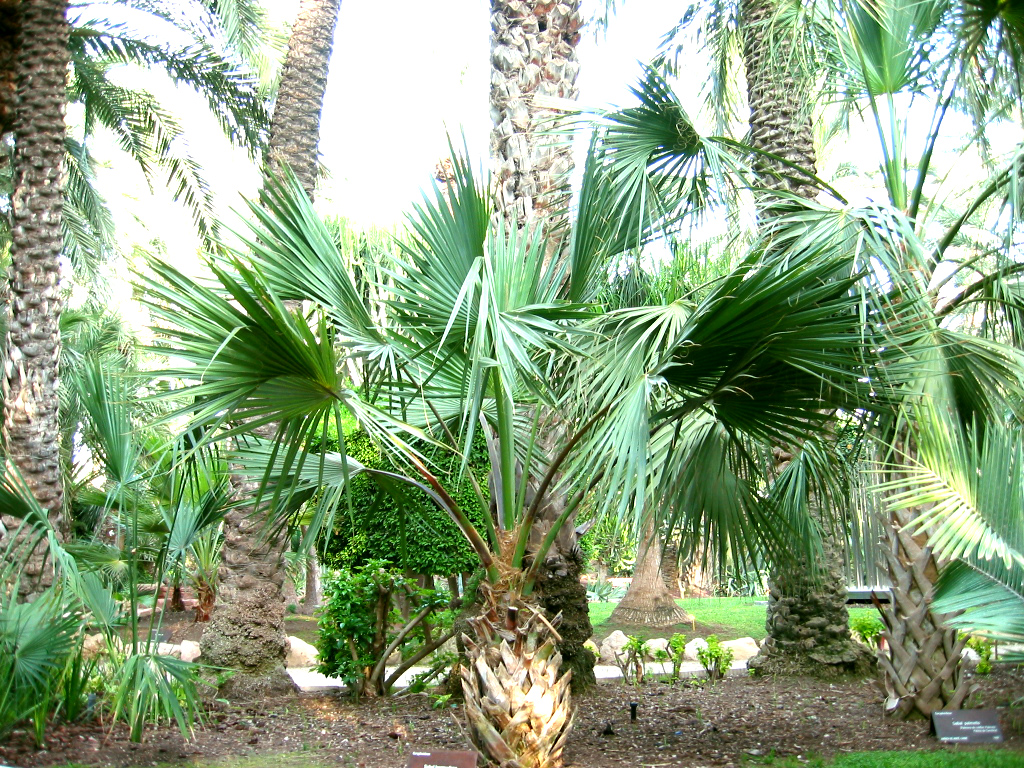
Bermuda palmetto

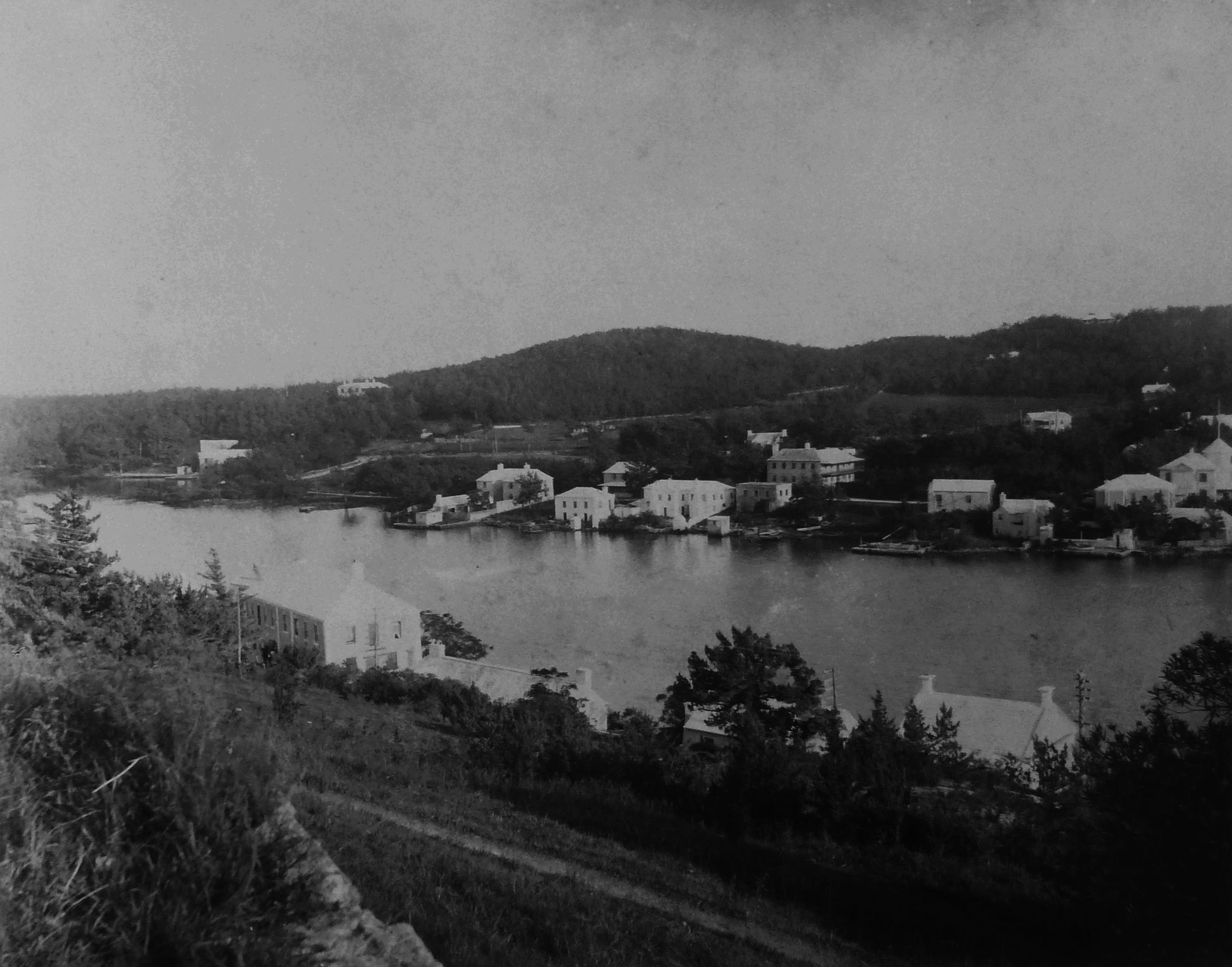
1904 view across Hamilton Harbour from Fort Hamilton of cedar-cloaked hills in Paget Parish

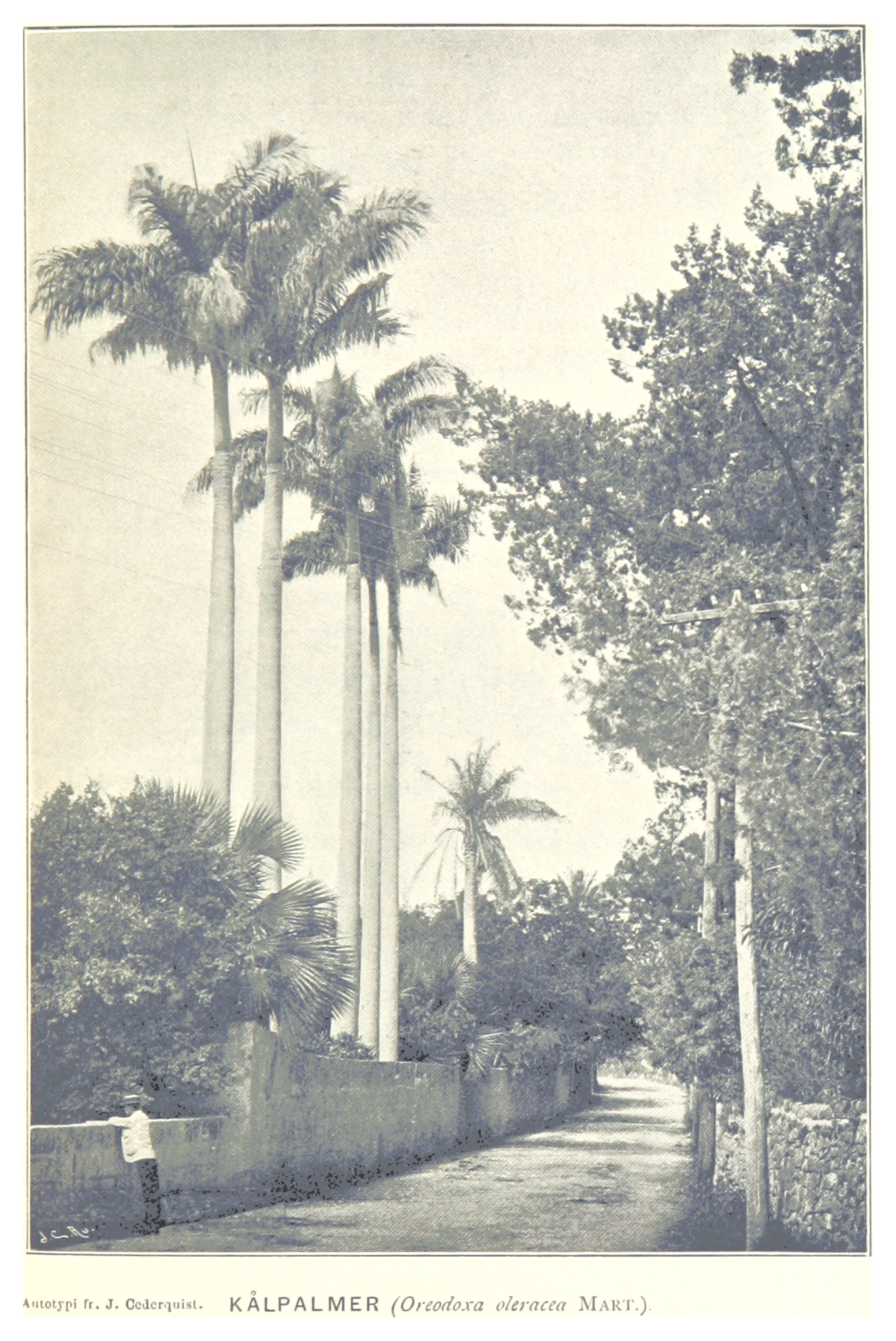
Caribbean royal palm in an 1895 photo

Over 1000 species of vascular plants are found on the islands, the majority of which were introduced. Of the 165 native species, 17 are endemic. Forest cover is around 20% of the total land area, equivalent to 1,000 hectares of forest in 2020, which was unchanged from 1990.

At the time of the first human settlement by shipwrecked English sailors in 1593, Bermuda was dominated by forests of Bermuda cedar (Juniperus bermudiana) with mangrove swamps on the coast. More deliberate settlement began after 1609, and colonists began clearing forests to use for building and shipmaking, and to develop agricultural cultivation. By the 1830s, the demands of the shipbuilding industry had denuded the forests, but these recovered in many areas.

In the 1940s the cedar forests were devastated by introduced scale insects, which killed roughly eight million trees. Replanting using resistant trees has taken place since then, but the area covered by cedar is only 10% of what it used to be. Another important component of the original forest was Bermuda palmetto (Sabal bermudana), a small palm tree. It now grows in a few small patches, notably at Paget Marsh. Other trees and shrubs include Bermuda olivewood (Elaeodendron laneanum) and Bermuda snowberry (Chiococca alba). The climate allows for the growth of other introduced palms such as royal palm (Roystonea spp.) and coconut palm (Cocos nucifera), although the coconuts seldom fruit properly, due to the relatively moderate temperatures on the island. Bermuda is the farthest north location where coconut palms grow naturally.

Remnant patches of mangrove swamp can be found around the coast and at some inland sites, including Hungry Bay Nature Reserve and Mangrove Lake. These are important for moderating the effects of storms and providing transitional habitats. Here black mangrove (Avicennia germinans) and red mangrove (Rhizophora mangle) are the northernmost mangroves in the Atlantic. The inland swamps are particularly interesting as mangroves thrive in salty water; in this case, the saltwater arrives through underground channels rather than the usual tidal wash of coastal mangrove swamps. Areas of peat marsh include Devonshire, Pembroke, and Paget marshes.

Bermuda has four endemic ferns: Bermuda maidenhair fern (Adiantum bellum), Bermuda shield fern (Thelypteris bermudiana), Bermuda cave fern (Ctenitis sloanei) and Governor Laffan's fern (Diplazium laffanianum). The latter is extinct in the wild but is grown at Bermuda Botanical Gardens. The endemic flora of the island also include two mosses, ten lichens and forty fungi.

Among the many introduced species are the casuarina (Casuarina equisetifolia) and Suriname cherry (Eugenia uniflora).

=== Endemic ===
Trees and palms

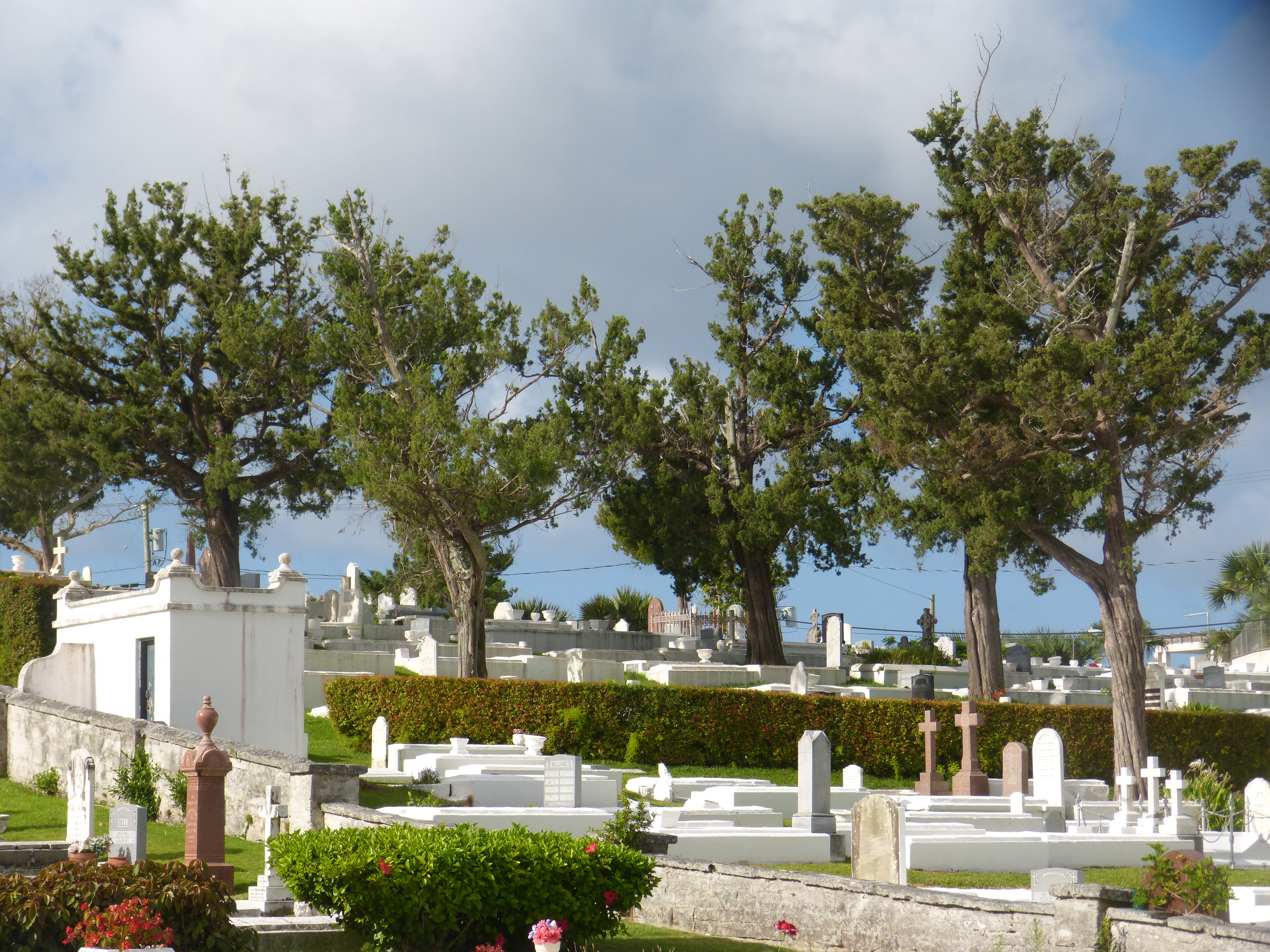
Bermuda cedars (Juniperus bermudiana) in the cemetery of St. John's Church (Church of England), Pembroke, Bermuda 2016

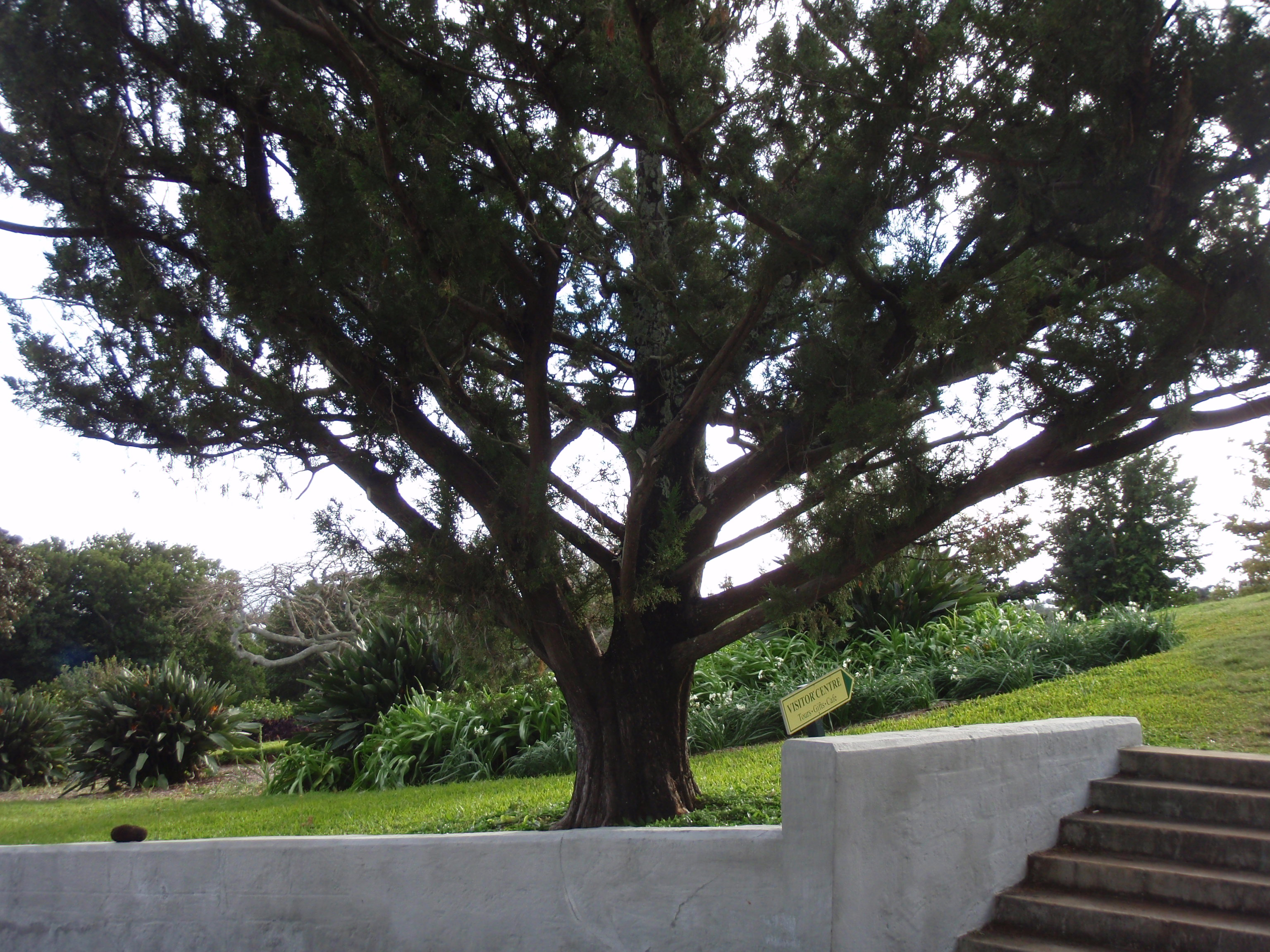
Bermuda cedar (Juniperus bermudiana)

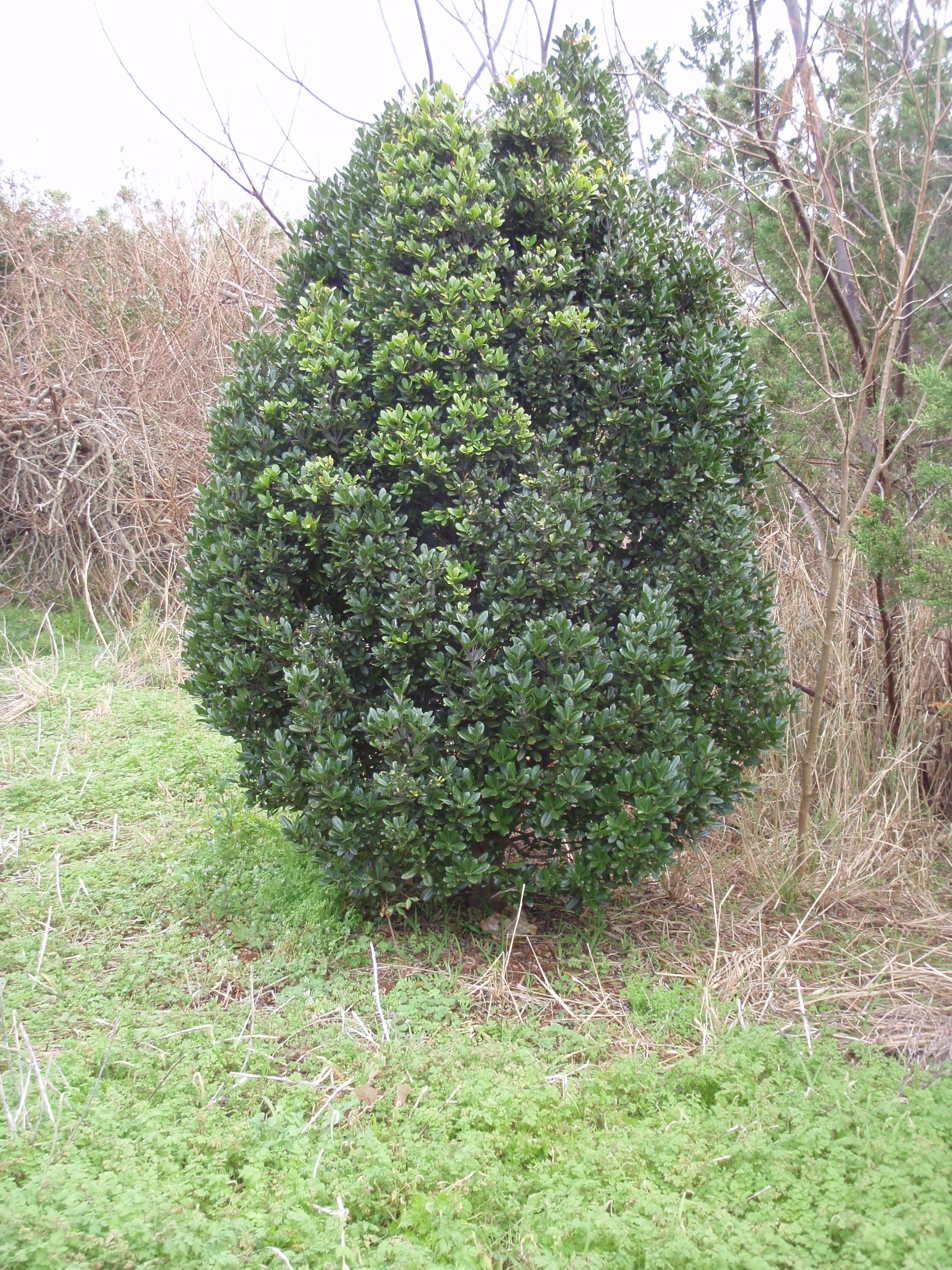
Bermuda olivewood (Elaeodendron laneanum)

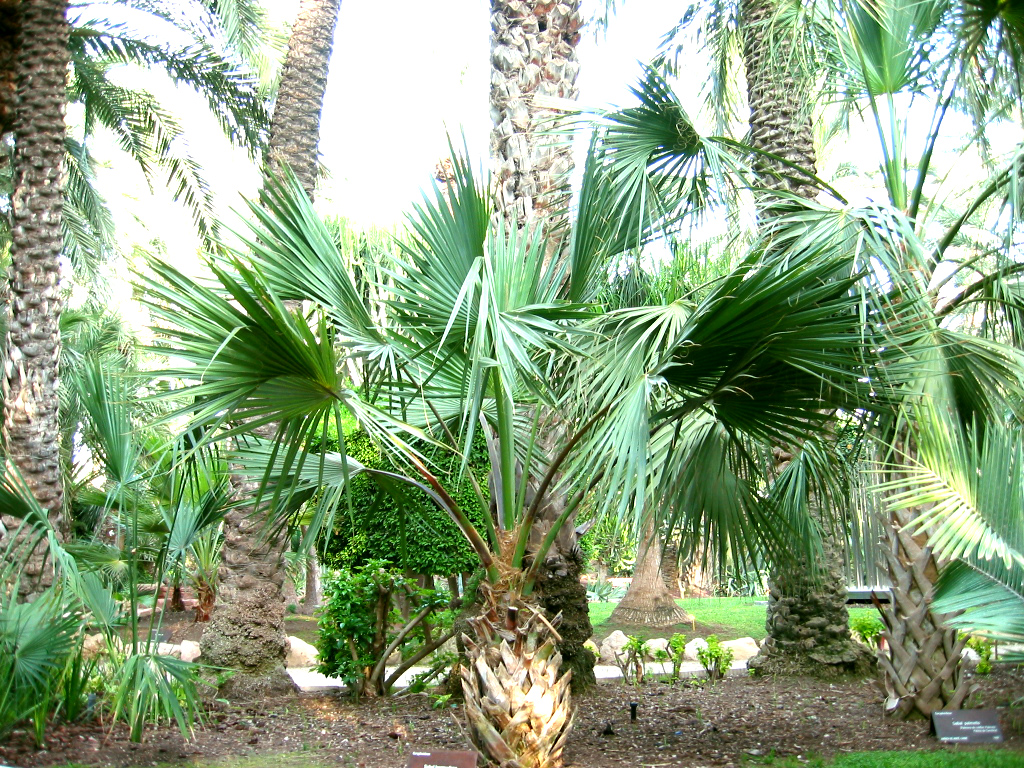
Bermuda palmetto (Sabal bermudana)
Shrubs

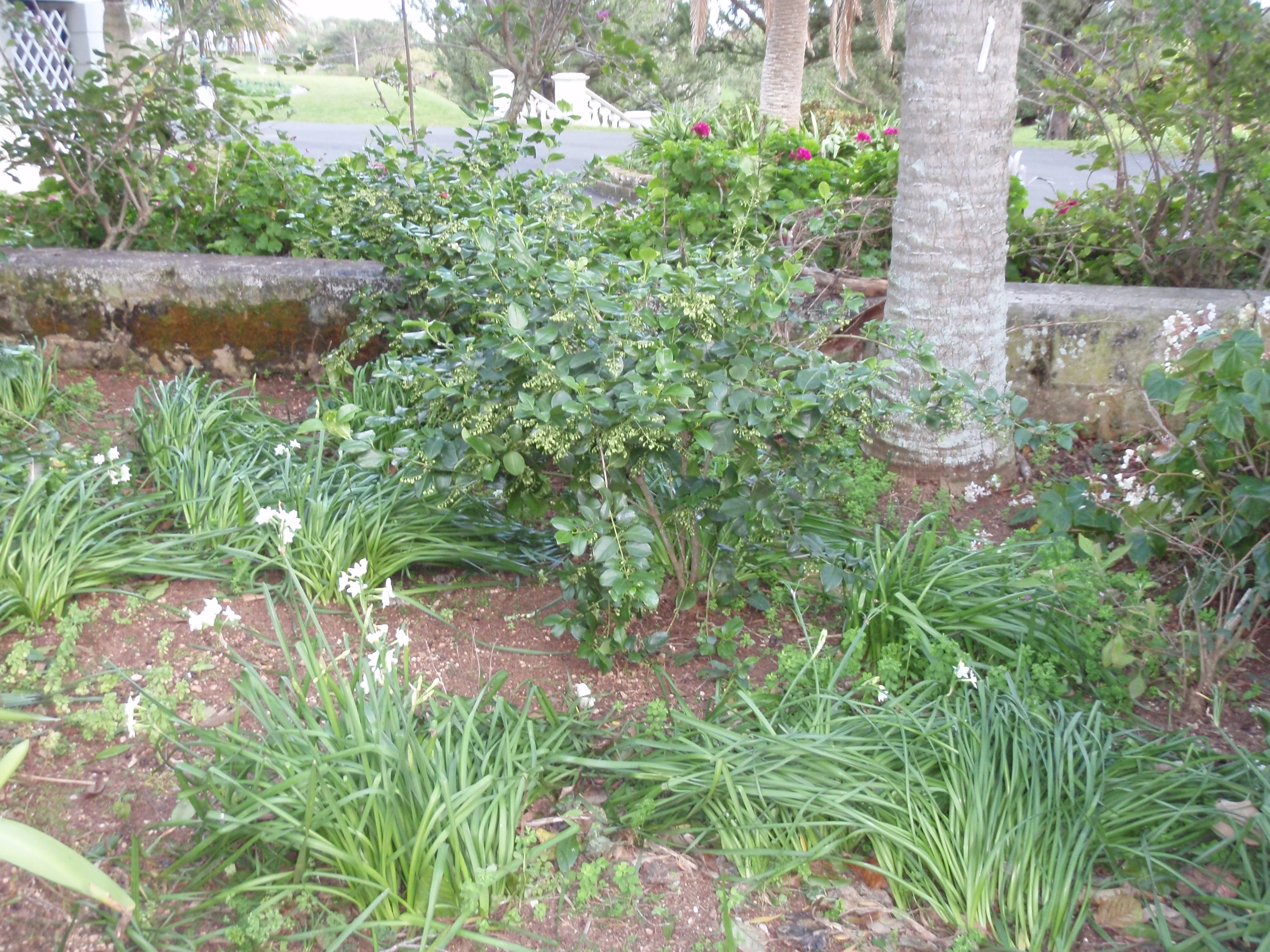
Bermuda snowberry (Chiococca alba)

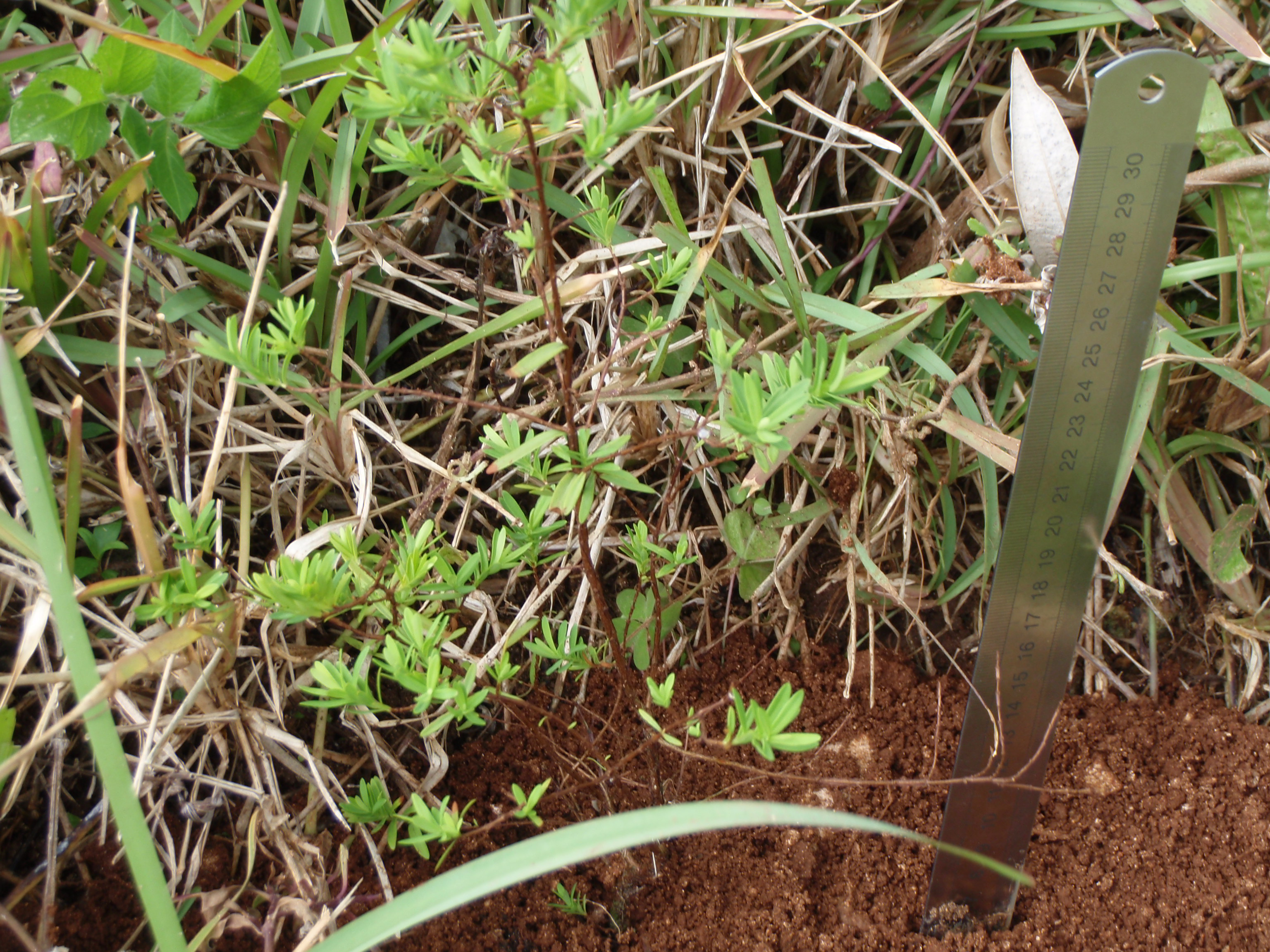
St. Andrew's cross (Hypericum macrosepalum)

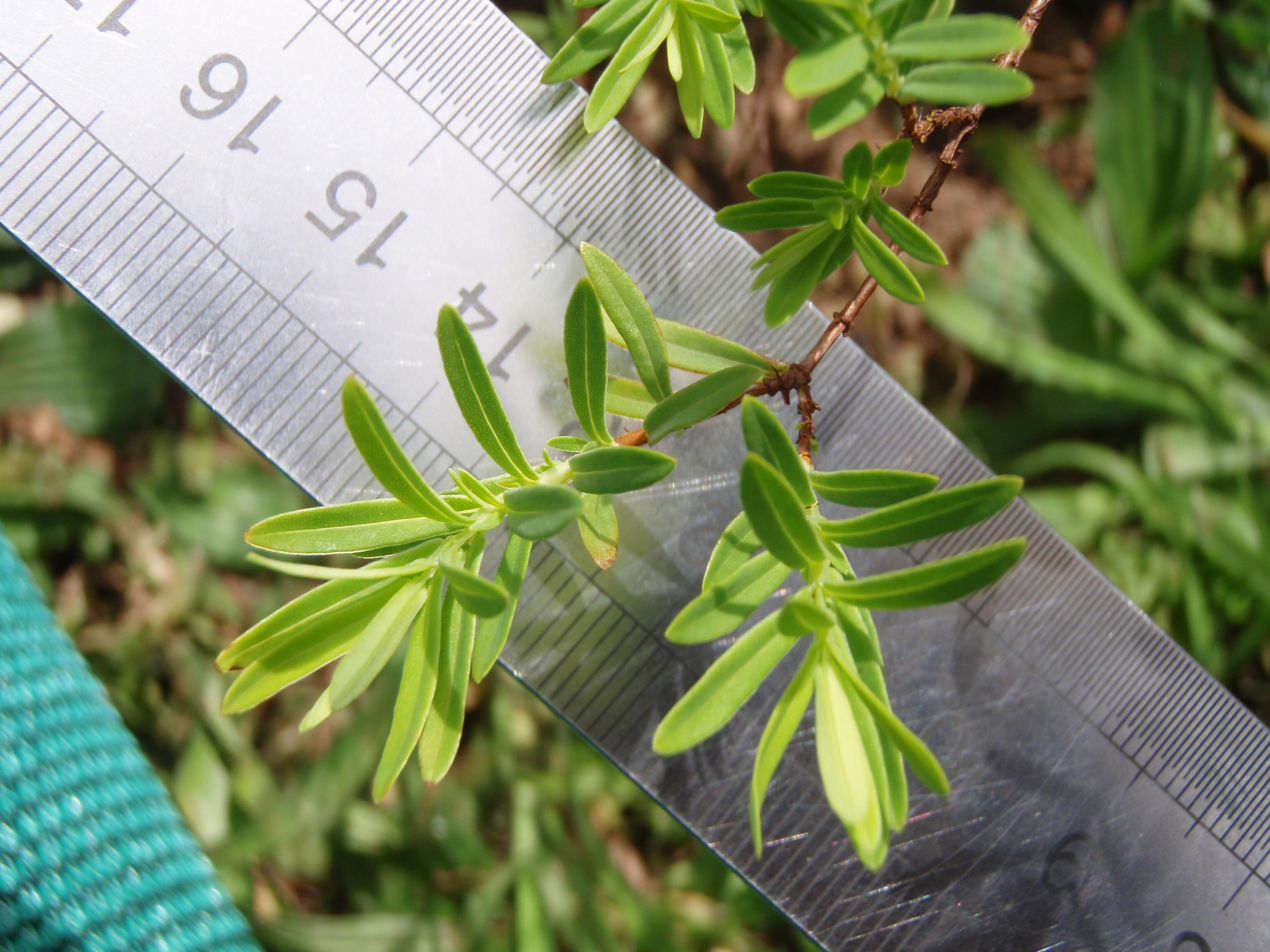
St. Andrew's cross leaf
Flowers, grasses, ferns and others

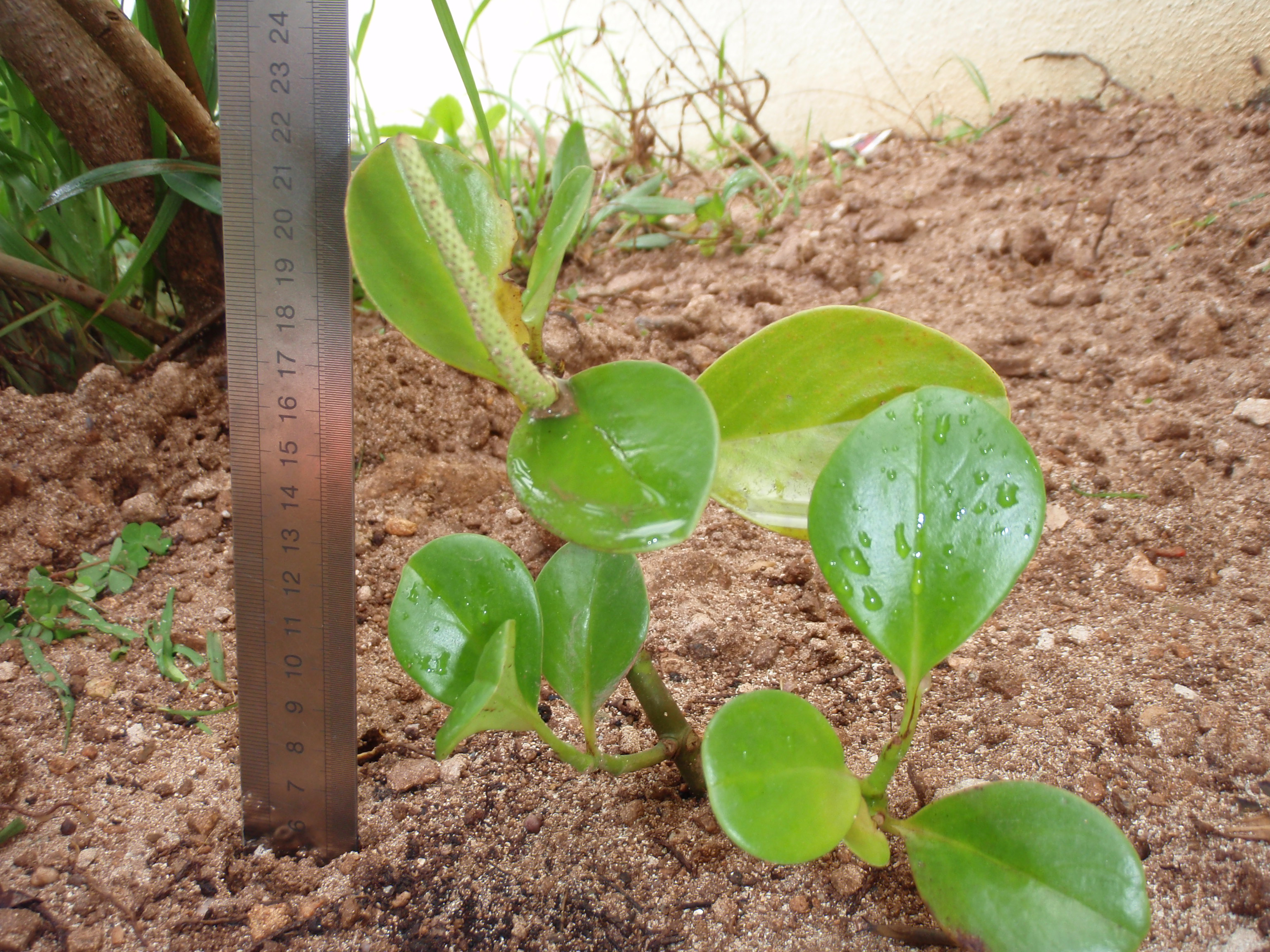
Wild Bermuda pepper (Peperomia septentrionalis)

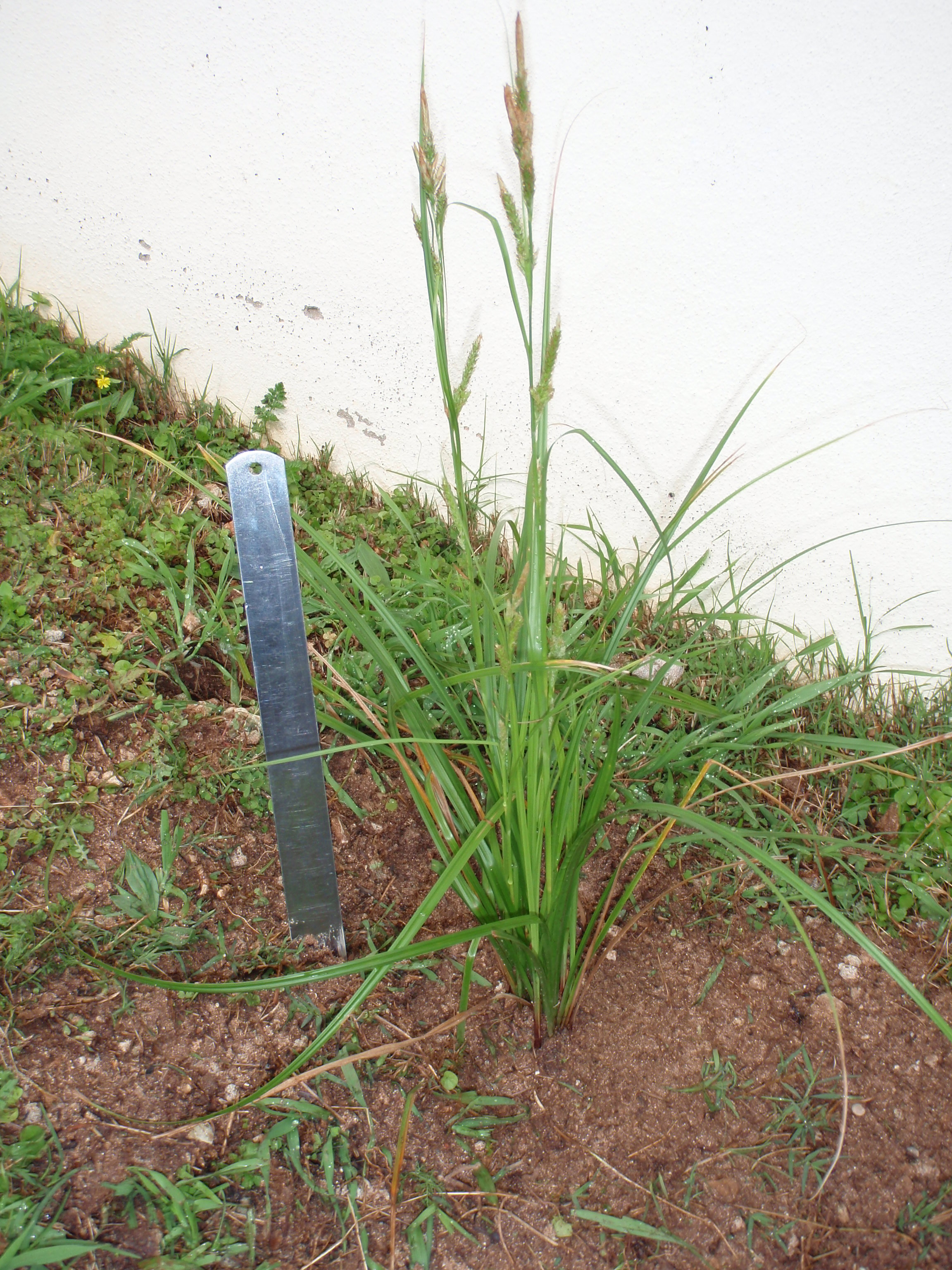
Bermuda sedge (Carex bermudiana)

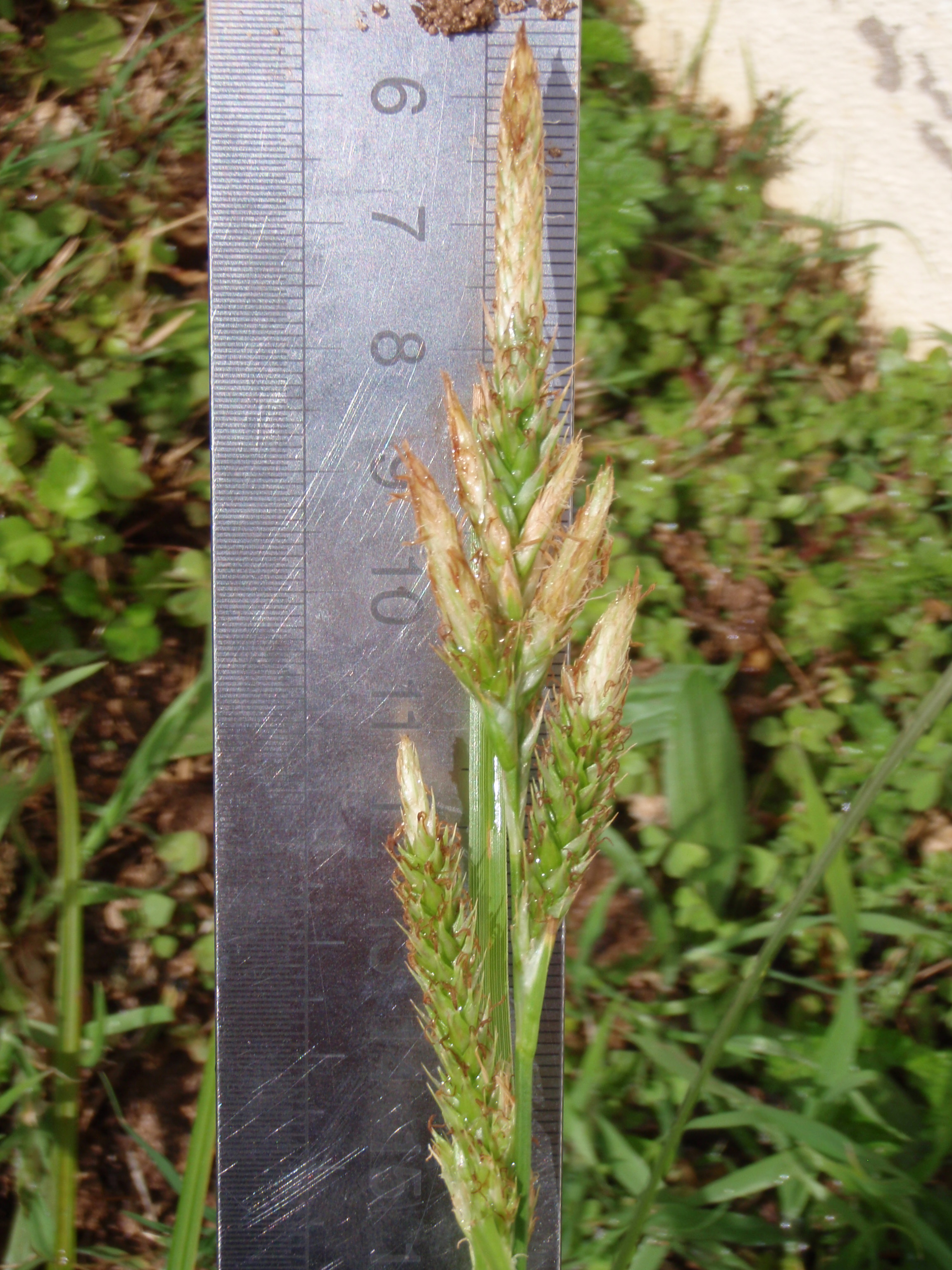
Bermuda sedge (Carex bermudiana) flower

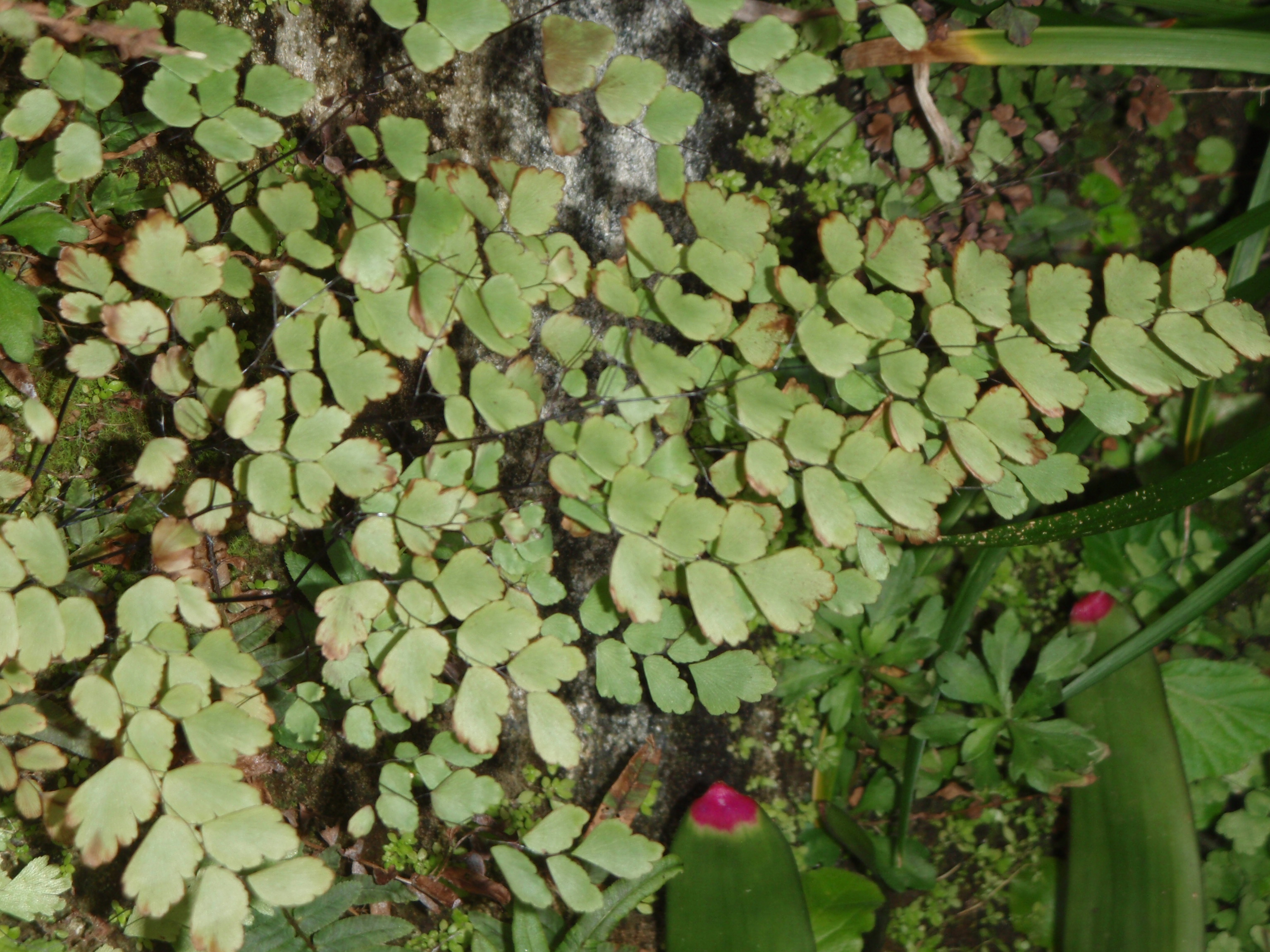
Bermuda maidenhair fern (Adiantum bellum)
- Bermudiana (Sisyrinchium bermudiana)
- Darrell's fleabane (Erigeron darrellianus)
- Bermuda campylopus (moss) (Campylopus bermudianus)
- Bermuda bean (Phaseolus lignosus)
- Bermuda spike rush (Eleocharis bermudiana)
- Bermuda trichostomum (moss) (Trichostomum bermudanum)
- Governor Laffan's fern (Diplazium laffanianum)

=== Native ===
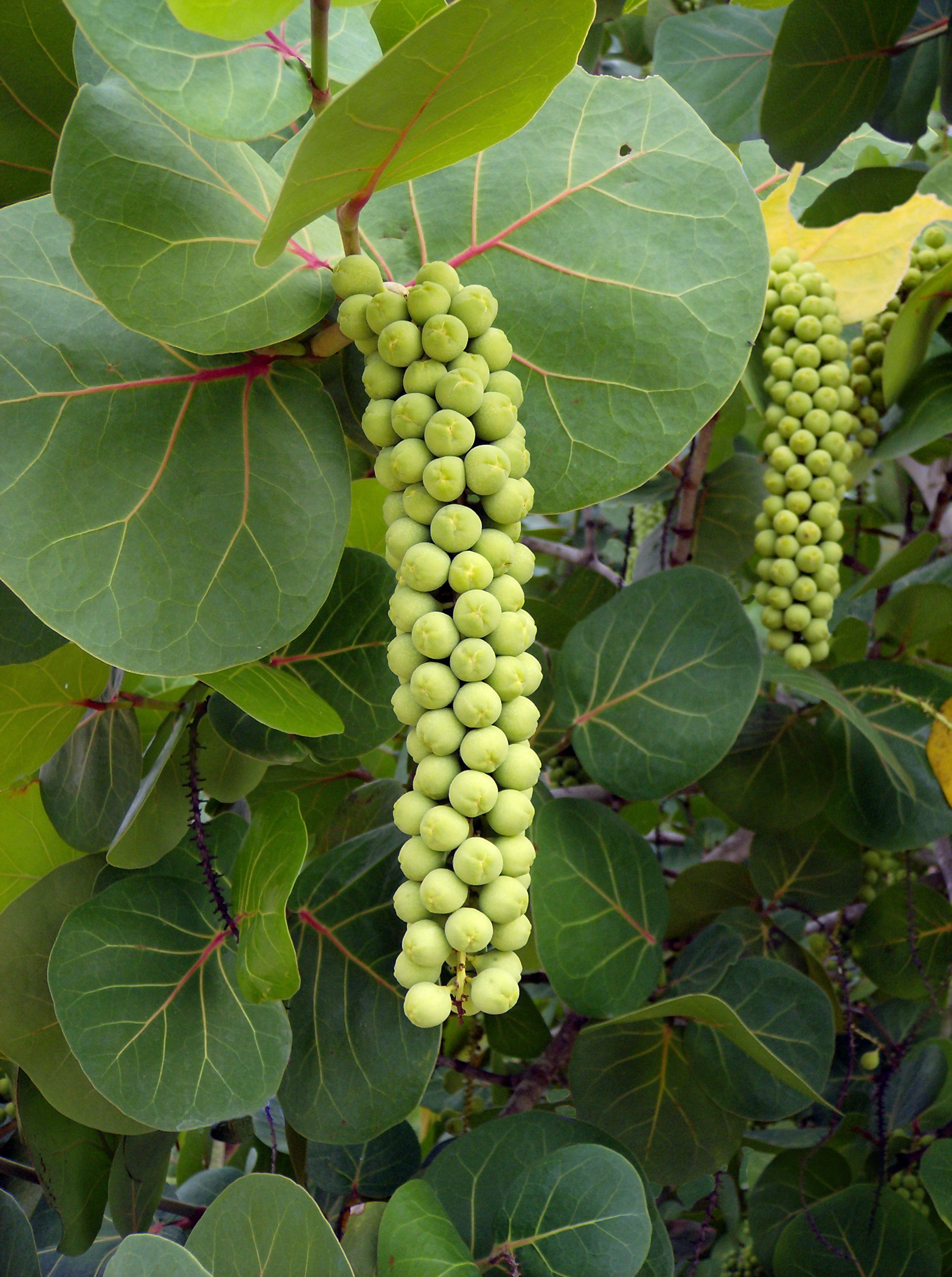
Bay grape (Coccoloba uvifera)

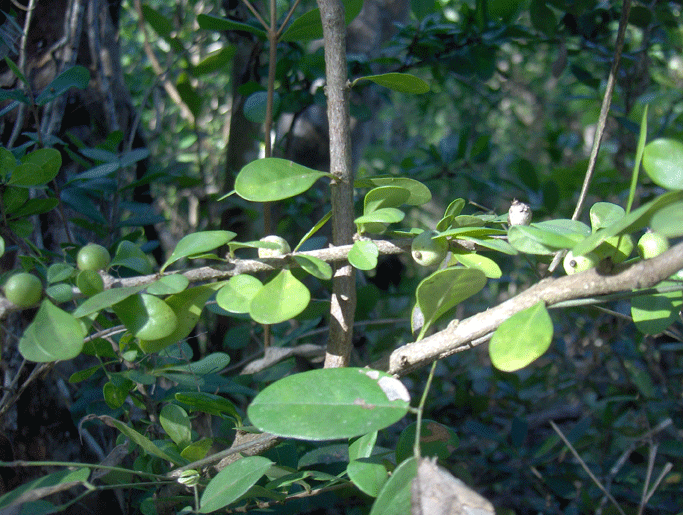
Box briar (Randia aculeata)

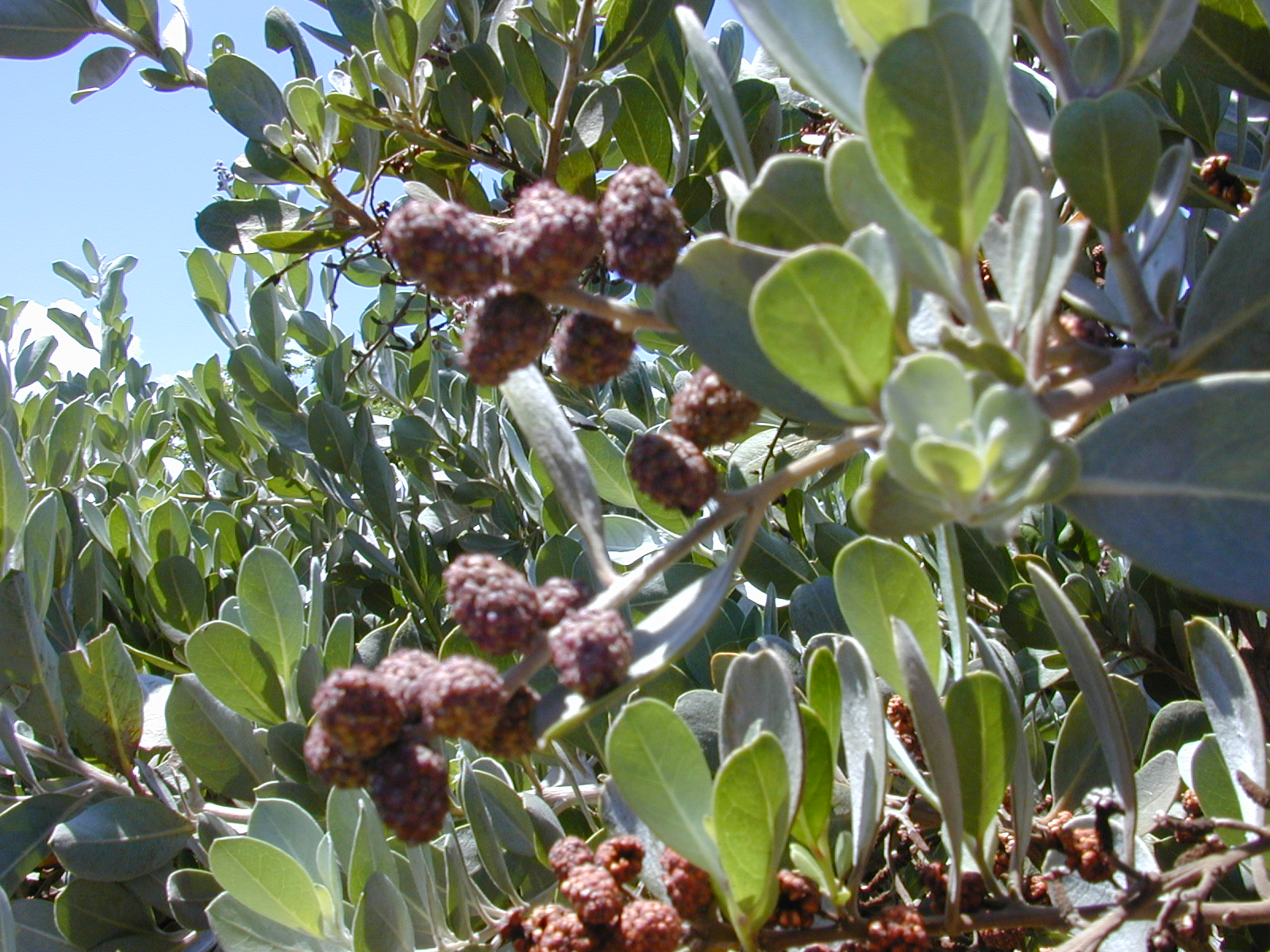
Buttonwood (Conocarpus erectus)

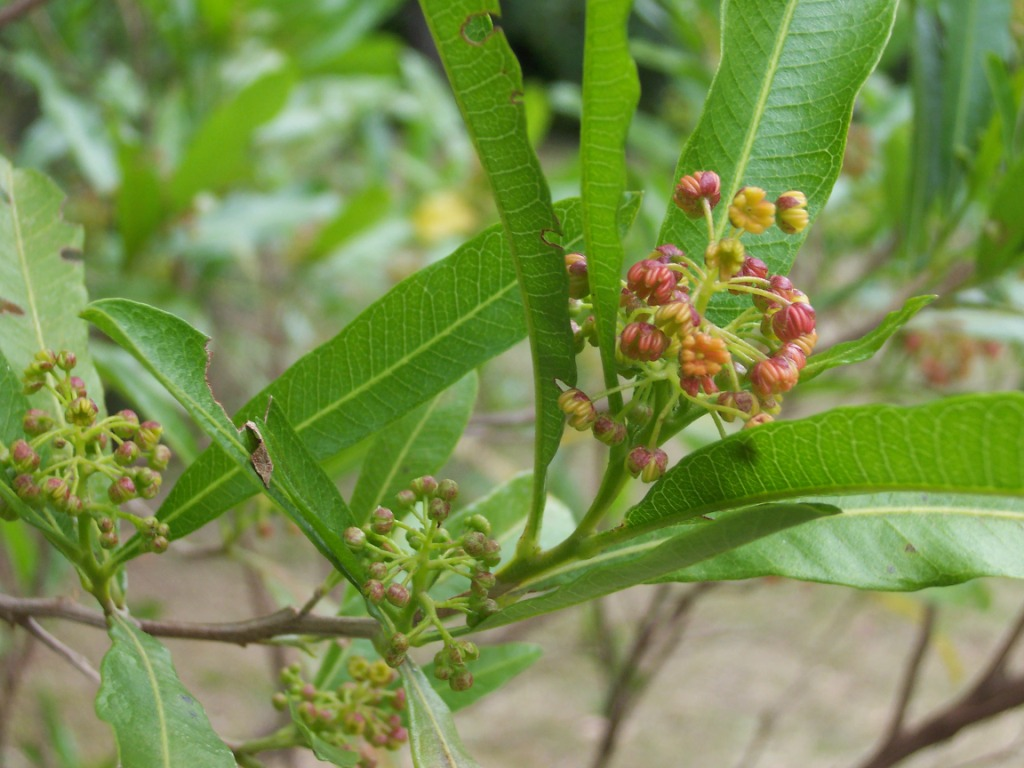
Jamaica dogwood (Dodonaea viscosa)

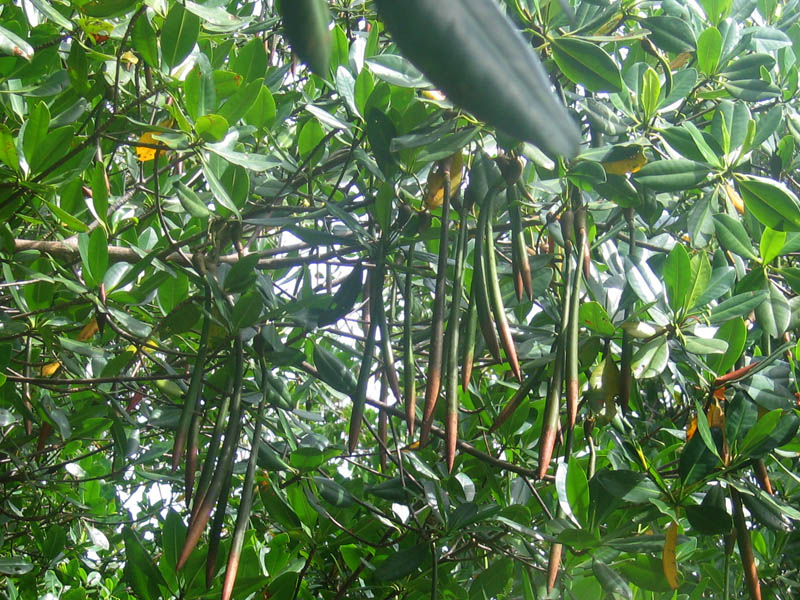
Red mangrove (Rhizophora mangle)

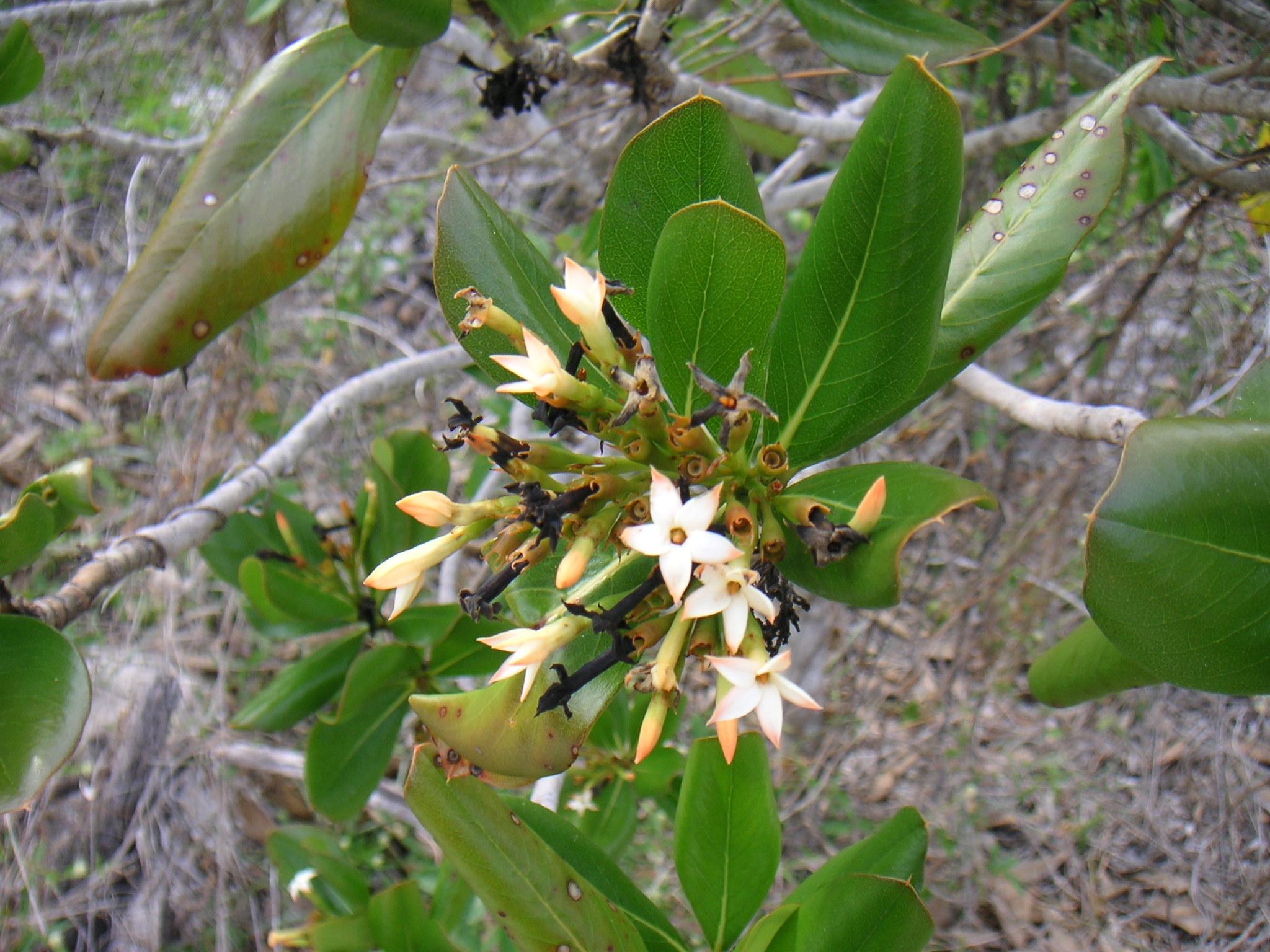
Seven year apple (Casasia clusiifolia)

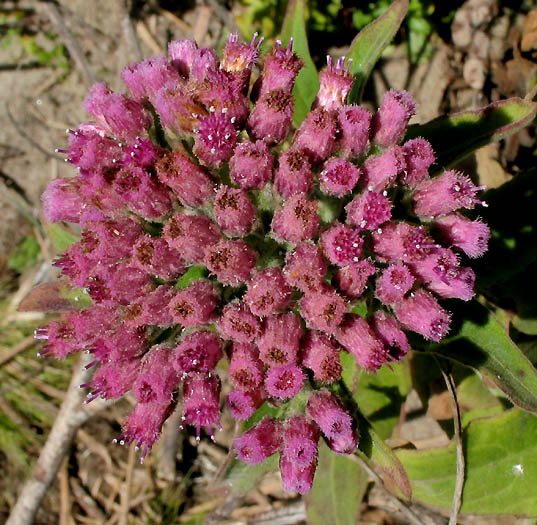
Shrubby fleabane (Pluchea odorata)

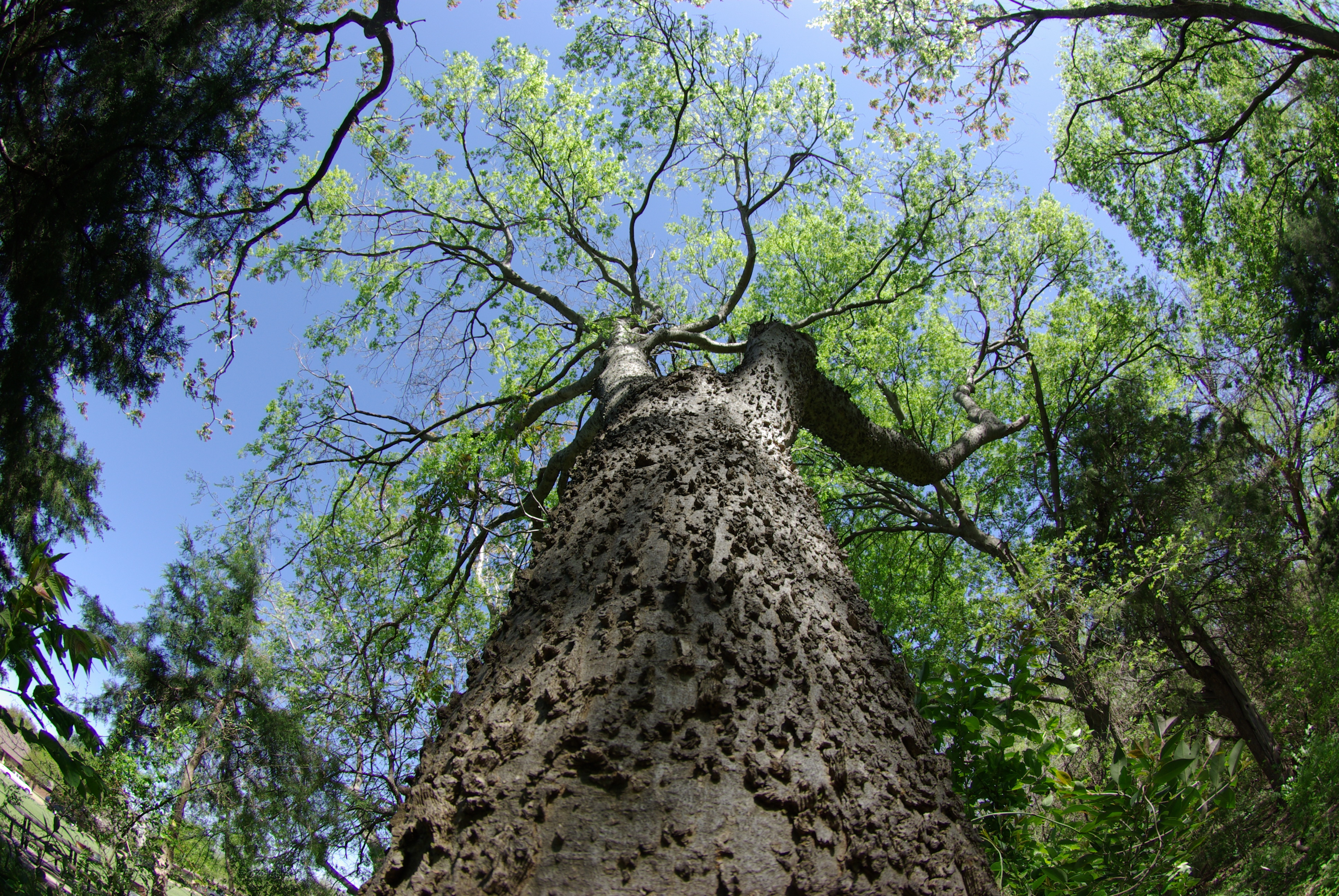
Southern hackberry (Celtis laevigata)

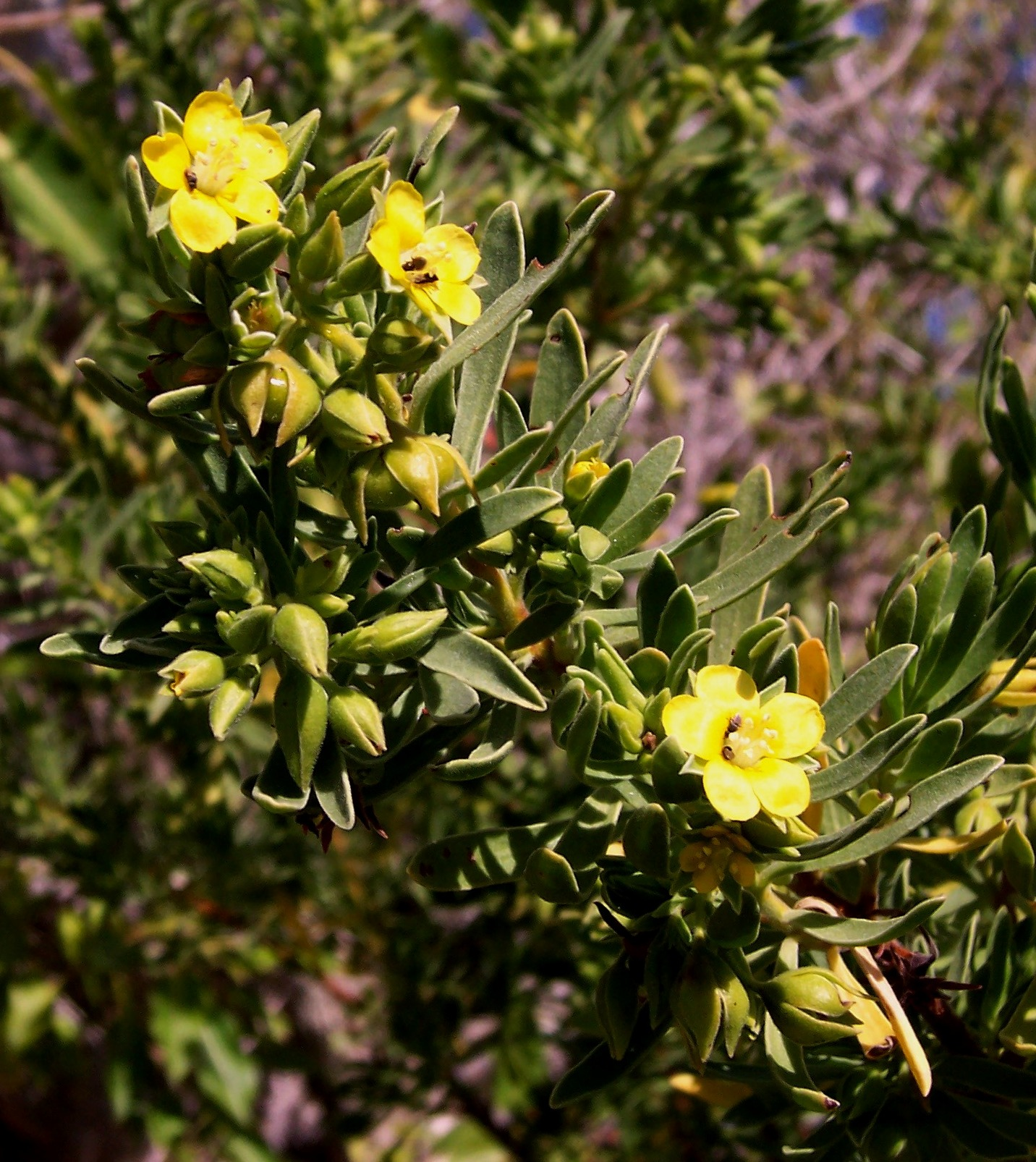
Tassel plant (Suriana maritima)
- Forestiera (Forestiera segregata)
- Lamarcks trema (Trema lamarckiana)
- Black mangrove (Avicennia nitida)
- White stopper (Eugenia axillaris)
- Wild coffee shrub (Psychotria undata)
- Yellow wood (Zanthoxylum flavum)

== Land animals ==
=== Amphibians ===
Bermuda has no native amphibians. A species of toad, cane toad (Rhinella marina), and two species of frog, Antilles coqui (Eleutherodactylus johnstonei), and Eleutherodactylus gossei were introduced by humans through the transportation of orchids to the island prior to the 1900s, and subsequently became naturalized. R. marina and E. johnstonei are common, but E. gossei is thought to have been recently extirpated. They are nocturnal and can often be heard at night in Bermuda. Their songs are most prevalent from April until November.

=== Reptiles ===
Four species of lizard and two species of turtle comprise Bermuda's non-marine reptilian fauna. Of the lizards, the Bermuda rock lizard (Plestiodon longirostris), also known as the rock lizard or Bermuda skink, is the only endemic species. Once very common, the Bermuda skink is critically endangered. The Jamaican anole (Anolis grahami) was deliberately introduced in 1905 from Jamaica and is now by far the most common lizard in Bermuda. The Leach's anole (Anolis leachii) was accidentally introduced from Antigua about 1940 and is now common. The Barbados anole (Anolis extremus) was accidentally introduced about 1940 and is rarely seen. The diamondback terrapin (Malaclemys terrapin) is native to Bermuda. The red-eared slider turtle (Trachemys scripta elegans) was introduced as a pet, but has subsequently become invasive.

=== Mammals ===
All mammals in Bermuda were introduced by humans, except for four species of migratory North American bats of the genus Lasiurus: the hoary bat, eastern red bat, Seminole bat and silver-haired bat. Early accounts refer to wild or feral hogs, descendants of pigs left by the Spanish and Portuguese as feedstock for ships stopping at the islands for supplies. The house mouse, brown rat and black rat were accidentally introduced soon after the settlement of Bermuda, and feral cats have become common as another introduced species.

=== Birds ===
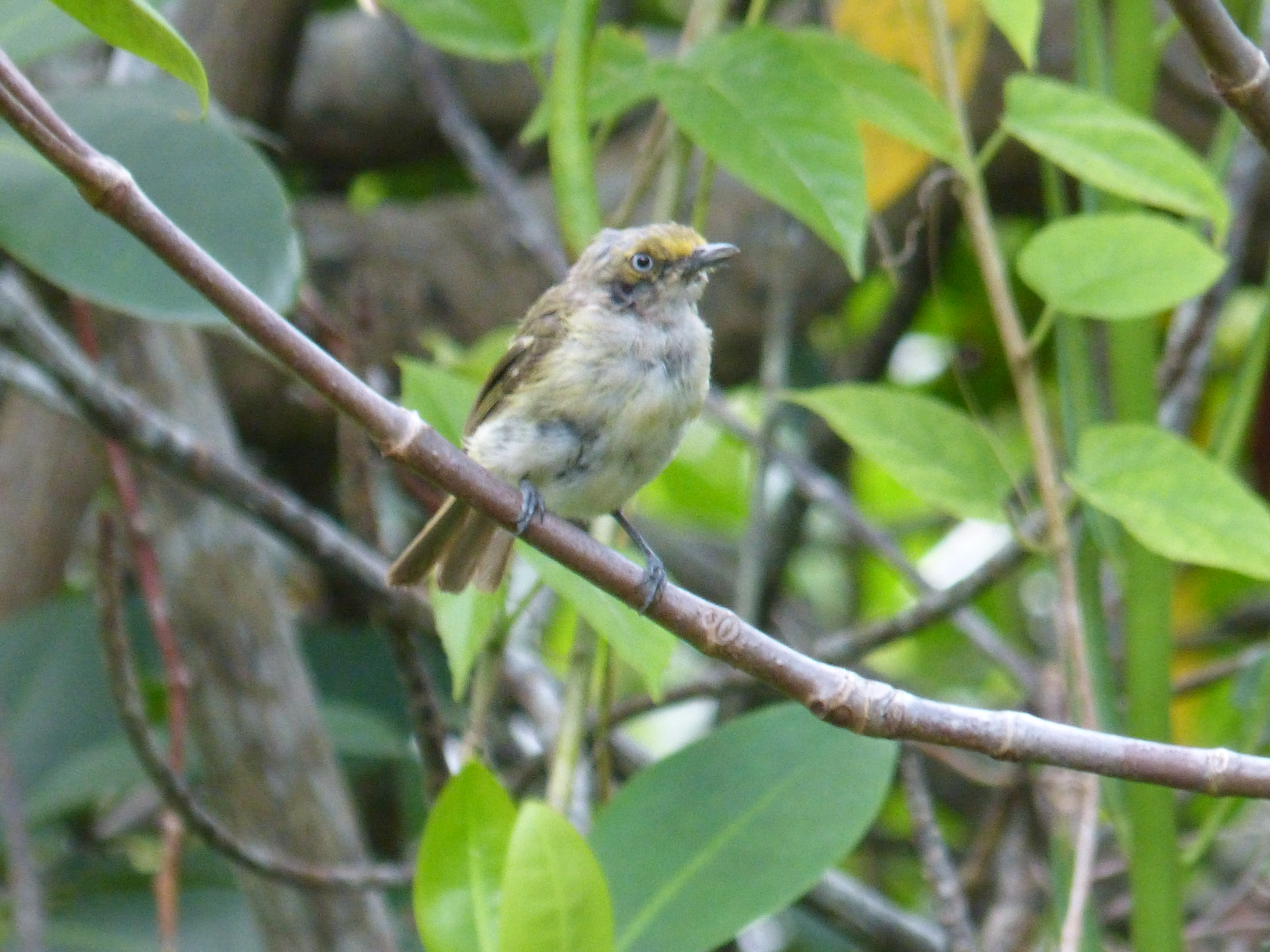
A white-eyed vireo (Vireo griseus bermudianus)

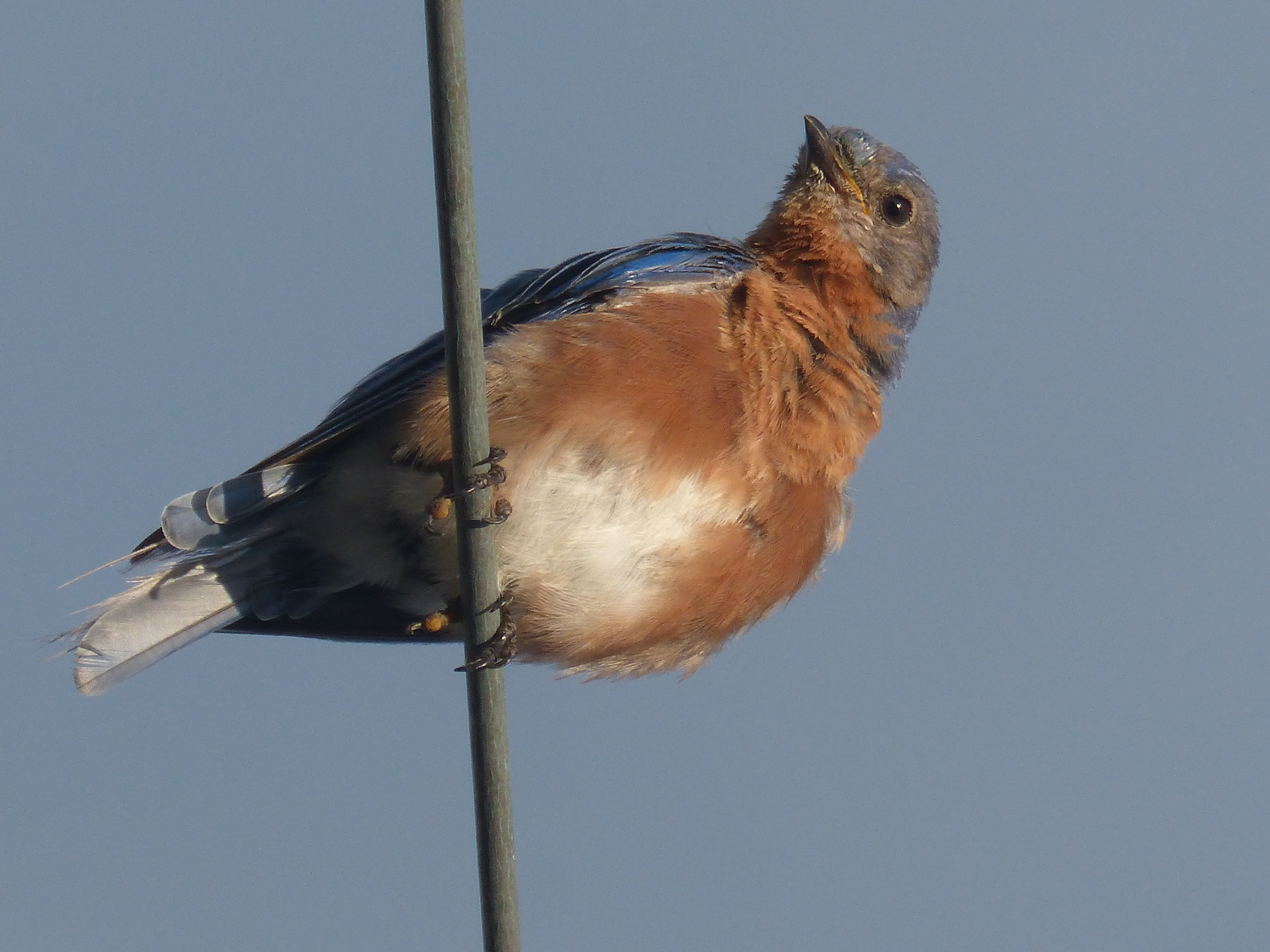
Juvenile eastern bluebird (Sialia sialis bermudensis), from below

Over 360 species of bird have been recorded on Bermuda. The majority of these are migrants or vagrants from North America or elsewhere. Only 24 species breed on the island; 13 of these are thought to be native.

One endemic species is the Bermuda petrel or cahow (Pterodroma cahow), which was thought to have been extinct since the 1620s. Its ground-nesting habitats had been severely disrupted by introduced species and colonists had killed the birds for food. In 1951, researchers discovered 18 breeding pairs, and started a recovery program to preserve and protect the species.

Another endemic subspecies is the Bermuda white-eyed vireo or chick-of-the-village (Vireo griseus bermudianus). The national bird of Bermuda is the white-tailed tropicbird or longtail, which is a summer migrant to Bermuda, its most northerly breeding site. Other native birds include the eastern bluebird, grey catbird and perhaps the common ground dove. The common gallinule is the most common native waterbird; very small numbers of American coot and pied-billed grebe are breeding. Small numbers of common tern nest around the coast. The barn owl and mourning dove colonized the island during the 20th century, and the green heron has recently begun to breed.

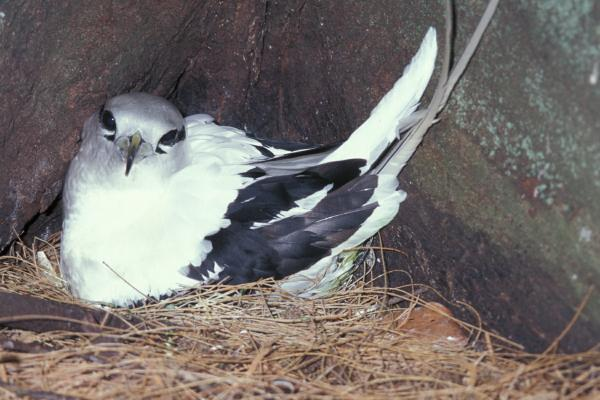
A white-tailed tropicbird or longtail

Of the introduced birds, the European starling, house sparrow, great kiskadee, rock dove, American crow and chicken are all very numerous and considered to be pests. Other introduced species include the mallard, northern cardinal, European goldfinch and small numbers of orange-cheeked and common waxbills. The yellow-crowned night heron was introduced in the 1970s to replace the extinct native heron.

Fossil remains of a variety of species have been found on the island, including a crane, an owl and the short-tailed albatross. Some of these became extinct as the islands' land-mass shrank by nine tenths after the Last Glacial Maximum, while others were exterminated by early settlers. The Bermuda petrel was thought to be extinct until its rediscovery in 1951.

Among the many non-breeding migrants are a variety of shorebirds, herons and ducks. In spring many shearwaters can be seen of the South Shore. Over 30 species of New World warbler are seen each year, with the yellow-rumped warbler being the most abundant. The arrival of many species is dependent on weather conditions; low-pressure systems moving across from North America often bring many birds to the islands. Among the rare visitors recorded are the Siberian flycatcher from Asia and the fork-tailed flycatcher and tropical kingbird from South America.

=== Insects ===
Lawrence Ogilvie, Bermuda's agricultural scientist 1923 to 1928 identified 395 local insects and wrote the Department of Agriculture's 52-page book The Insects of Bermuda, including Aphis ogilviei, which he discovered.

==== Ants ====
There are four ant species found in Bermuda. The African big-headed ant (Pheidole megacephala) and Argentine ant (Linepithema humile) are both invasive to Bermuda. The African ant was first recorded on the island in 1889, and the Argentine ant arrived in Bermuda in the 1940s. These two ants battle for territory and control over the island. Furthermore, there is the Bermuda ant (Odontomachus insularis), which is indigenous to the island. This ant was initially presumed to be extinct, however, they were re-discovered alive in July 2002. Carpenter ants (Camponotus spp.) are also found in Bermuda.

=== Terrestrial invertebrates ===
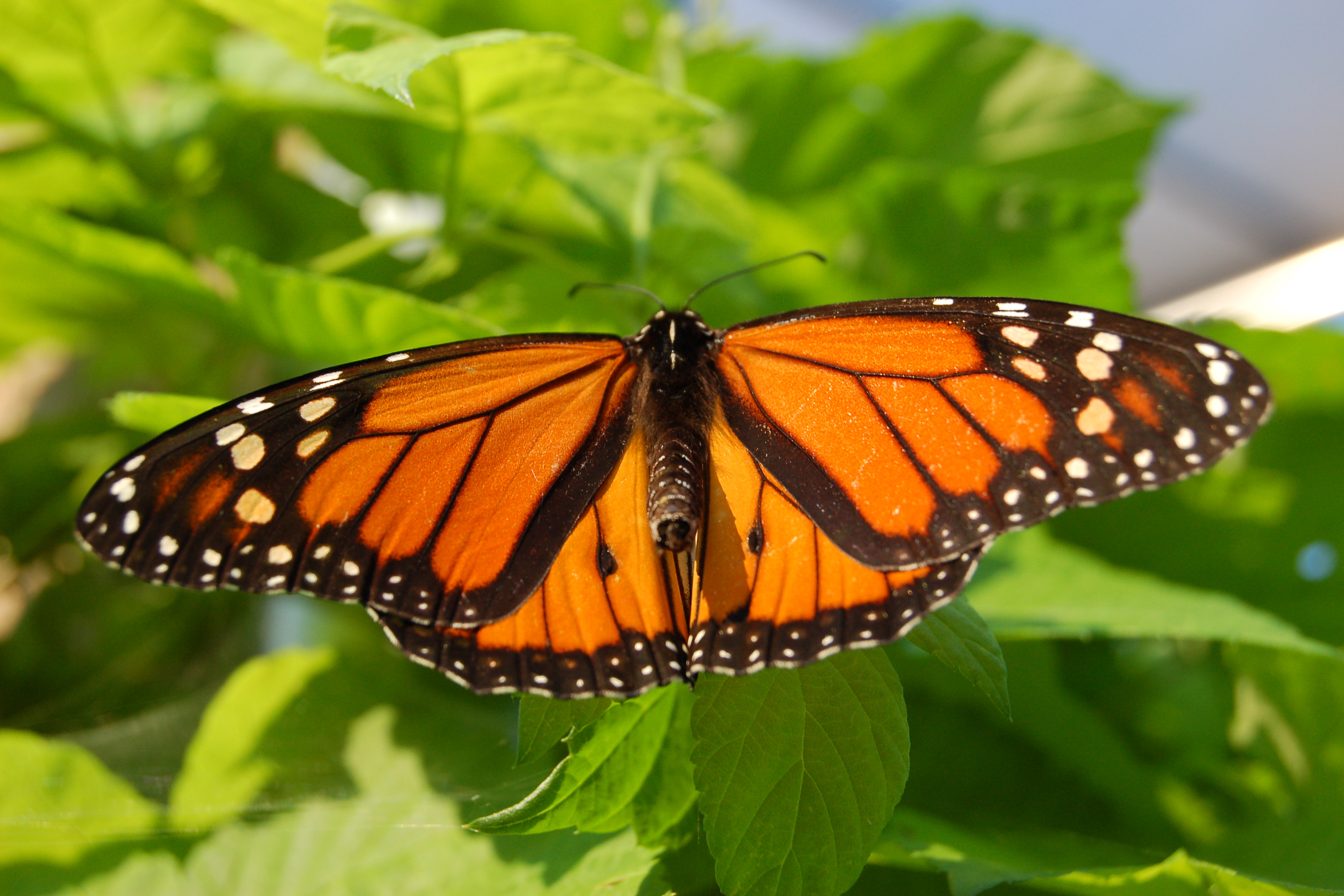
Monarch butterfly

More than 1100 kinds of insects and spiders are found on Bermuda, including 41 endemic insects and a possibly endemic spider. Eighteen species of butterfly have been seen; about six of these breed on the islands, including the large monarch and the very common Bermuda buckeye (Junonia coenia bergi). More than 200 moths have been recorded; one of the most conspicuous is Pseudosphinx tetrio, which can reach 14 cm (5.5 in) in wingspan.

Bermuda has lost a number of its endemic invertebrates, including the Bermuda cicada (Neotibicen bermudianus), which became extinct when the cedar forests disappeared. Some species feared extinct have been rediscovered, including a Bermuda land snail (Poecilozonties circumfirmatus) and the Bermuda ant (Odontomachus insularis).

== Marine life ==
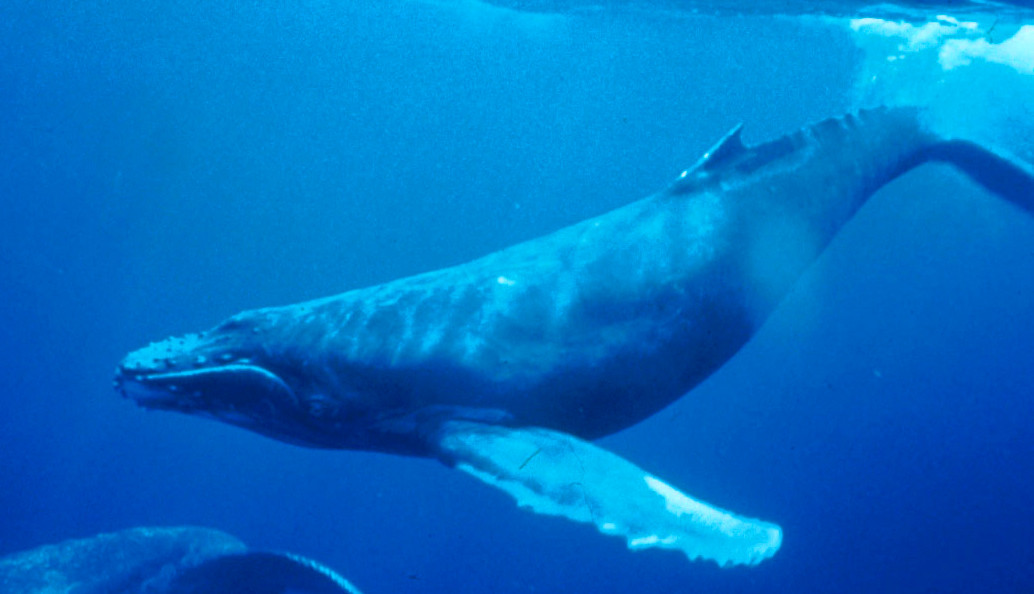
Humpback whale

Bermuda lies on the western edge of the Sargasso Sea, an area with high salinity, high temperature and few currents. Large quantities of seaweed of the genus Sargassum are present and there are high concentrations of plankton, but the area is less attractive to commercial fish species and seabirds.

Greater diversity is present in the coral reefs which surround the island.

=== Marine mammals ===
A variety of whales, dolphins and porpoises have been recorded in the waters around Bermuda. The most common of these is the humpback whale, which passes the islands in April and May during its northward migration.

=== Fish ===
There are many fish species in Bermuda's waters, such as the barracuda, Bermuda chub, bluestriped grunt, hogfish, longspine squirrelfish, various types of parrotfish, smooth trunkfish, and slippery dick, to name a few.

=== Marine invertebrates ===
==== Sea squirts ====
There are various types of sea squirts, such as the black sea squirt (Phallusia nigra), the purple sea squirt (Clavelina picta), the orange sea squirt (Ecteinascidia turbinata), and the lacy sea squirt (Botrylloides nigrum).

==== Crustaceans ====
There are various types of crabs in Bermuda. There are, Sally Lightfoot crabs (Grapsus grapsus), decorator crabs, swimming crabs (Portunidae), spider crabs (Majoidea), and Verrill's hermit crab (Calcinus verrillii). Great land crabs (Cardisoma guanhumi) are hard to find, but present in Bermuda. Finally, there is the Bermuda land crab (Gecarcinus lateralis), which is native, but not exclusive to, Bermuda.

== Threats and preservation ==
Bermuda was the first place in the Americas to pass conservation laws, protecting the Bermuda petrel in 1616 and the Bermuda cedar in 1622. It has a well-organised network of protected areas including Spittal Pond, marshes in Paget and Devonshire and Pembroke Parishes, Warwick Pond and the hills above Castle Harbour.

Only small areas of natural forest remain today; much was cleared since colonisation began in the 17th century, and recovered forest was lost in the 1940s due to insect infestation. The Bermuda petrel and Bermuda skink are highly endangered, and Bermuda cedar, Bermuda palmetto and Bermuda olivewood are all listed as threatened species. Some wild plants, including a spike rush, have disappeared. Introduced plants and animals have had adverse effects on the wildlife of the islands. The thriving tourist industry creates its own challenges to preserve the wildlife and habitat that attract visitors.

Parrotfish are crucial to the coral reefs of Bermuda. Overfishing has caused issues for parrotfish that live in the coastal waters of other islands, such as the U.S. Virgin Islands. Looking at these instances in other habitats can help conservationists prevent the parrotfish population in Bermuda from experiencing decline as well.

Birds such as the white-tailed tropicbird (Bermuda longtail) are strongly affected by hurricanes, as the hurricanes harm individuals and destroy their nests, which makes reproduction nearly impossible. Invasive species have been known to use similar nesting sites. Specifically, the rock pigeon often builds its nests within crevices around the island, including on rocky shorelines and cracks in Bermuda's tall cliffs. This is also where the Bermuda longtail nests, so the competition makes reproduction harder for the local species.
