= Bermudiana (disambiguation) =

Bermudiana is derived from the Bermuda, the name of an Atlantic archipelago that is a British Overseas Territory. It may refer to:

- Bermudiana Mill., a former genus of plants in the iris family now accepted as species of Sisyrinchium, Calydorea, Eleutherine, Iris, Libertia, and Olsynium
- Bermudiana bermudiana, known as Bermudiana, now accepted as Sisyrinchium bermudiana
- Carex bermudiana, a species of sedge indigenous to Bermuda
- Juniperus bermudiana, commonly known as Bermuda cedar, a species of juniper indigenous to Bermuda
- Pecluma bermudiana, a species of fern indigenous to Bermuda.
- Agrostis bermudiana, now accepted as Cynodon dactylon, Bermuda grass
- Chiococca bermudiana, now accepted as Chiococca alba, a flower in the family Rubiaceae
