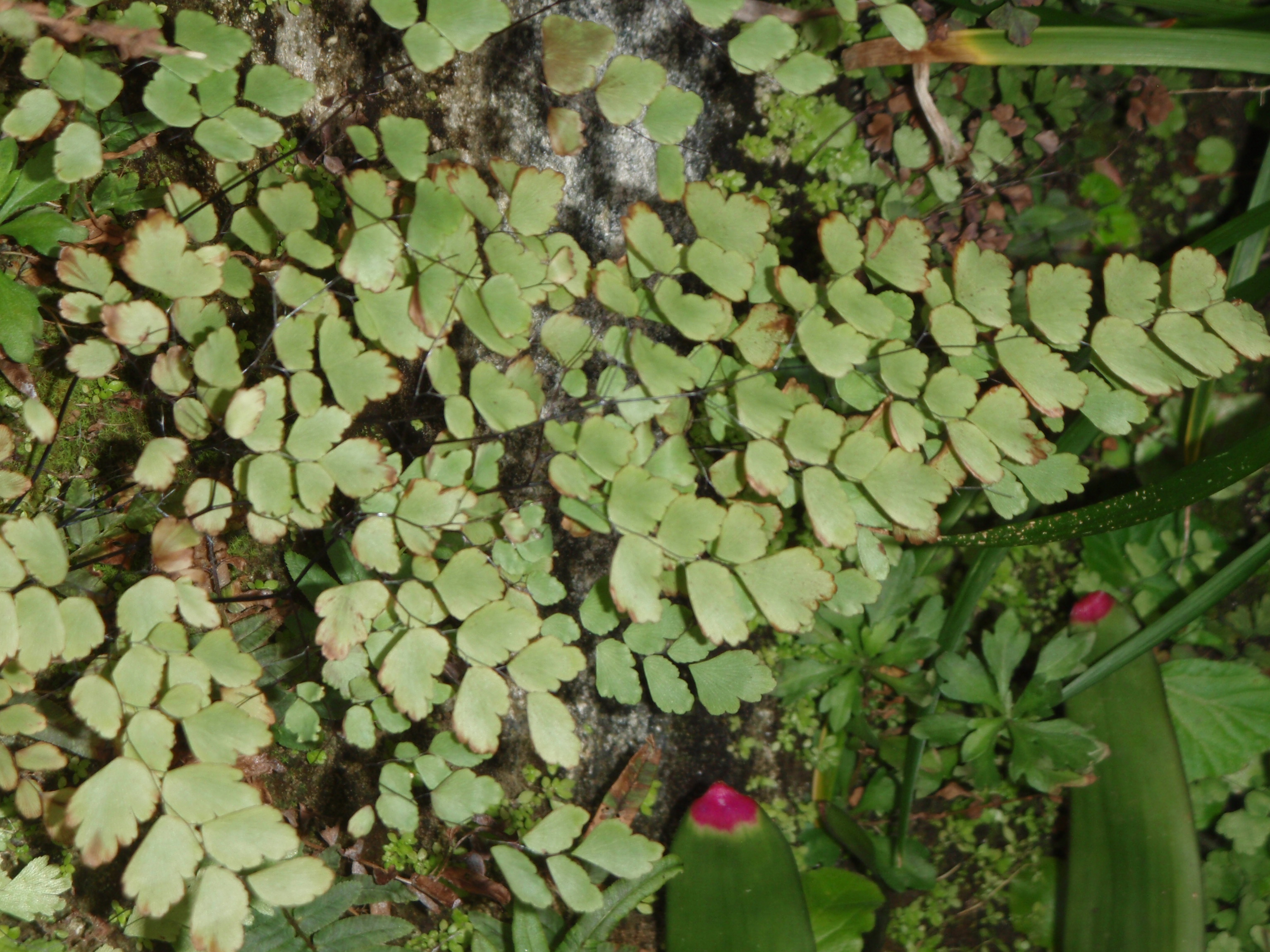

Conservation status
- Least Concern (IUCN 3.1)

Scientific classification
- Kingdom: Plantae
- Clade: Tracheophytes
- Division: Polypodiophyta
- Class: Polypodiopsida
- Order: Polypodiales
- Family: Pteridaceae
- Genus: Adiantum
- Species: A. bellum

Binomial name
- Adiantum bellum T. Moore

Synonyms
- Heterotypic Synonyms: Adiantum bellum var. walsingense Gilbert

= Adiantum bellum =

Bermuda maidenhair fern

Species of fern

Adiantum bellum is a species of fern in the family Pteridaceae. It is sometimes referred to by the common name Bermuda maidenhair fern.. It is endemic to Bermuda. It is 1 of 19 ferns native to Bermuda, the only native maidenhair, and the most prolific fern on the island. It is found only on Bermuda; however, the IPNI reports it also found in Guiana.

== Description ==
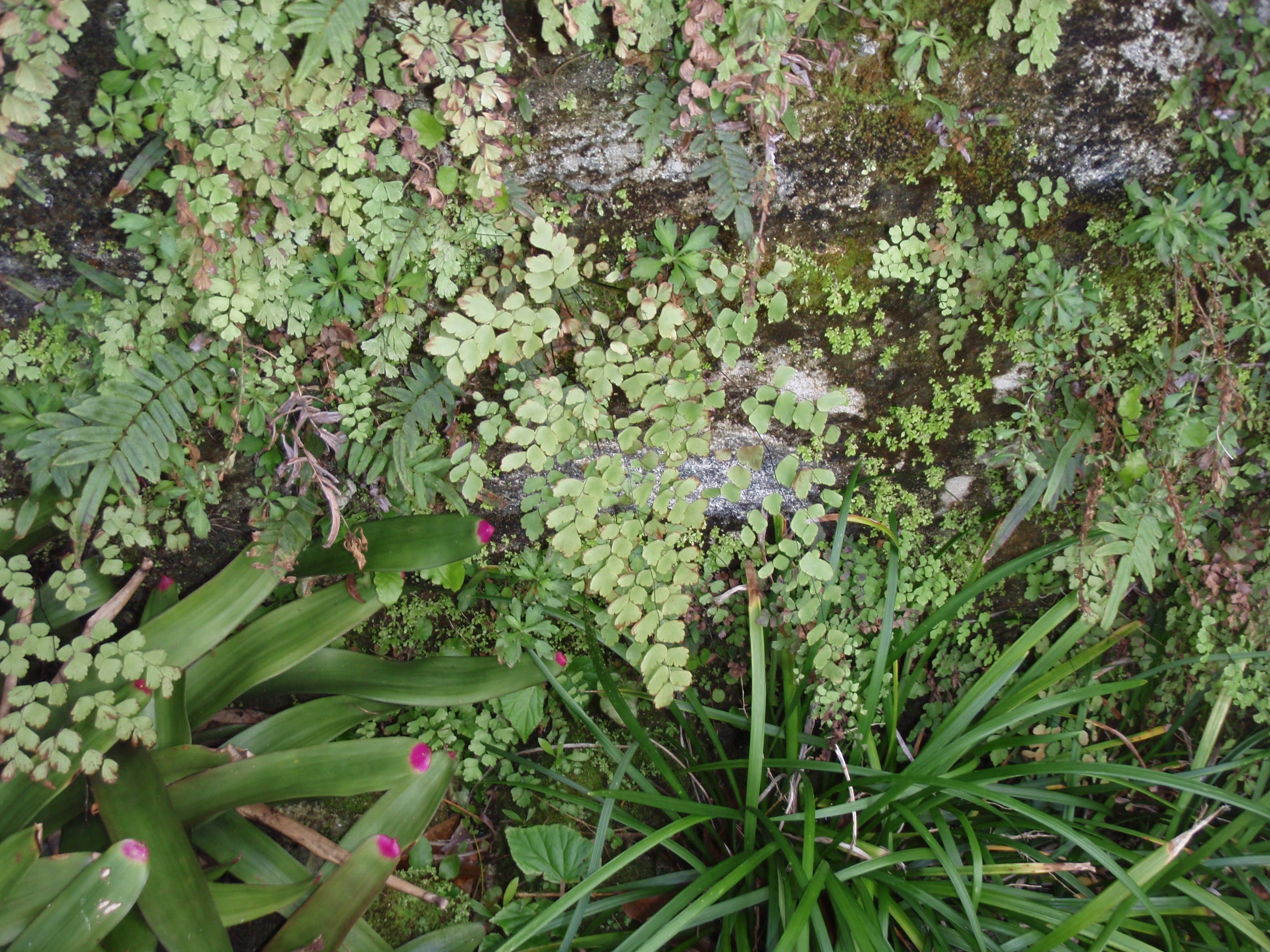
Bermuda maidenhair ferns (Adiantum bellum)

Adiantum bellum is deciduous. In the wild it grows in crevices, on cliffs and under rock ledges, in roadside verge, and terrestrially on hillsides. It requires moisture and shade and is often prolific near streams if in well-drained sites. The delicate fronds grow to 5–30 cm (2.0–11.8 in) long, and are fan-shaped, light to medium green with black stems (stipes and rachises). Benjamin D. Gilbert described a variety of A. bellum which he called walsingense; however, it is believed that this is just a variety produced by better soil and moisture conditions.

The other maidenhair fern that now grows wild on Bermuda, Adiantum capillus-veneris, was introduced by Governor Lefroy.

== Cultivation ==
Bermuda maidenhair fern is sometimes grown in gardens; however, it is not hardy and does better indoors. It prefers low to medium light, and moist potting mix. The cultivar Adiantum raddianum 'Pacottii' has been mislabeled as this species in the horticultural trade.

== Gallery ==
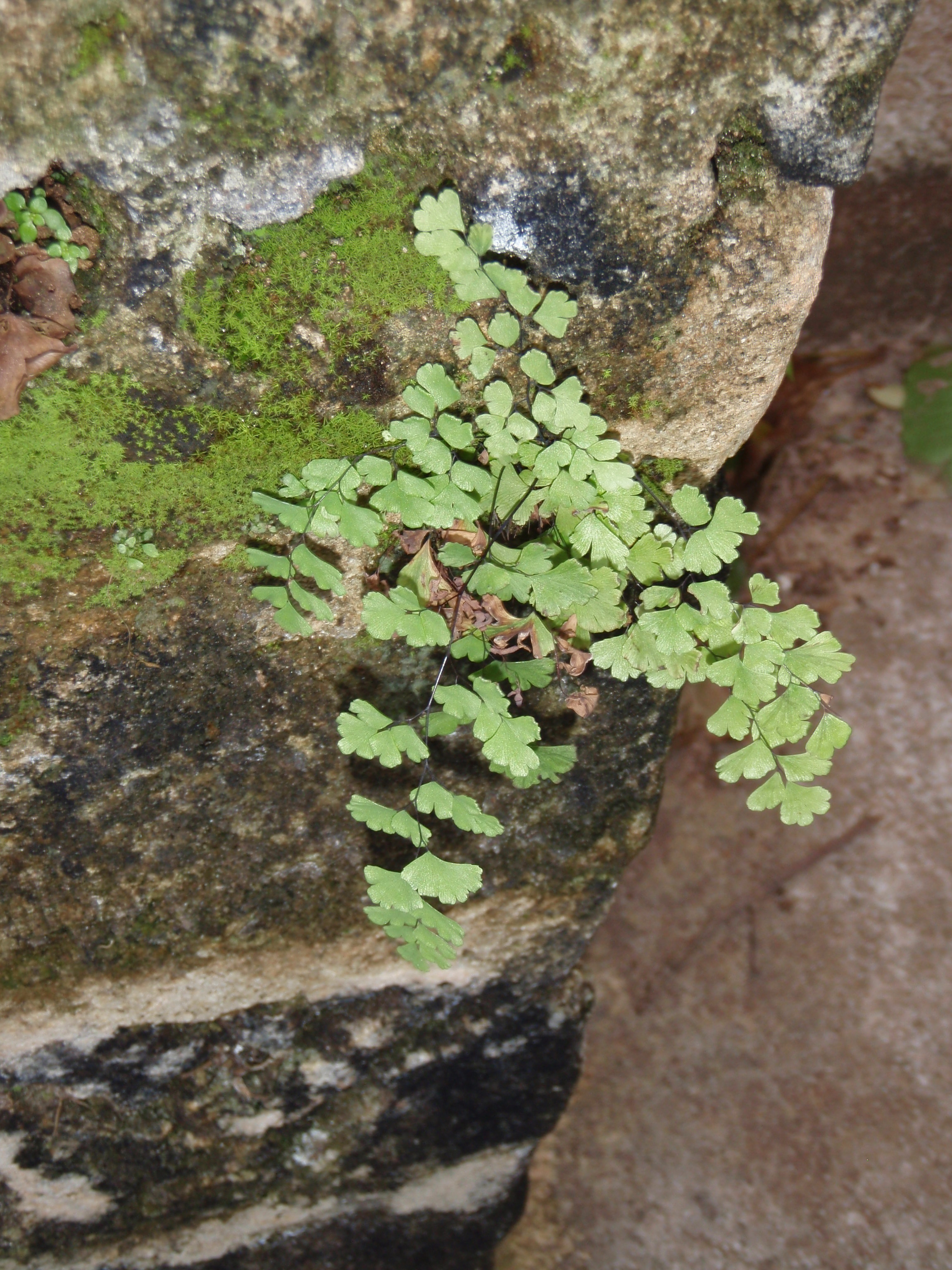
Bermuda maidenhair fern (Adiantum bellum)
