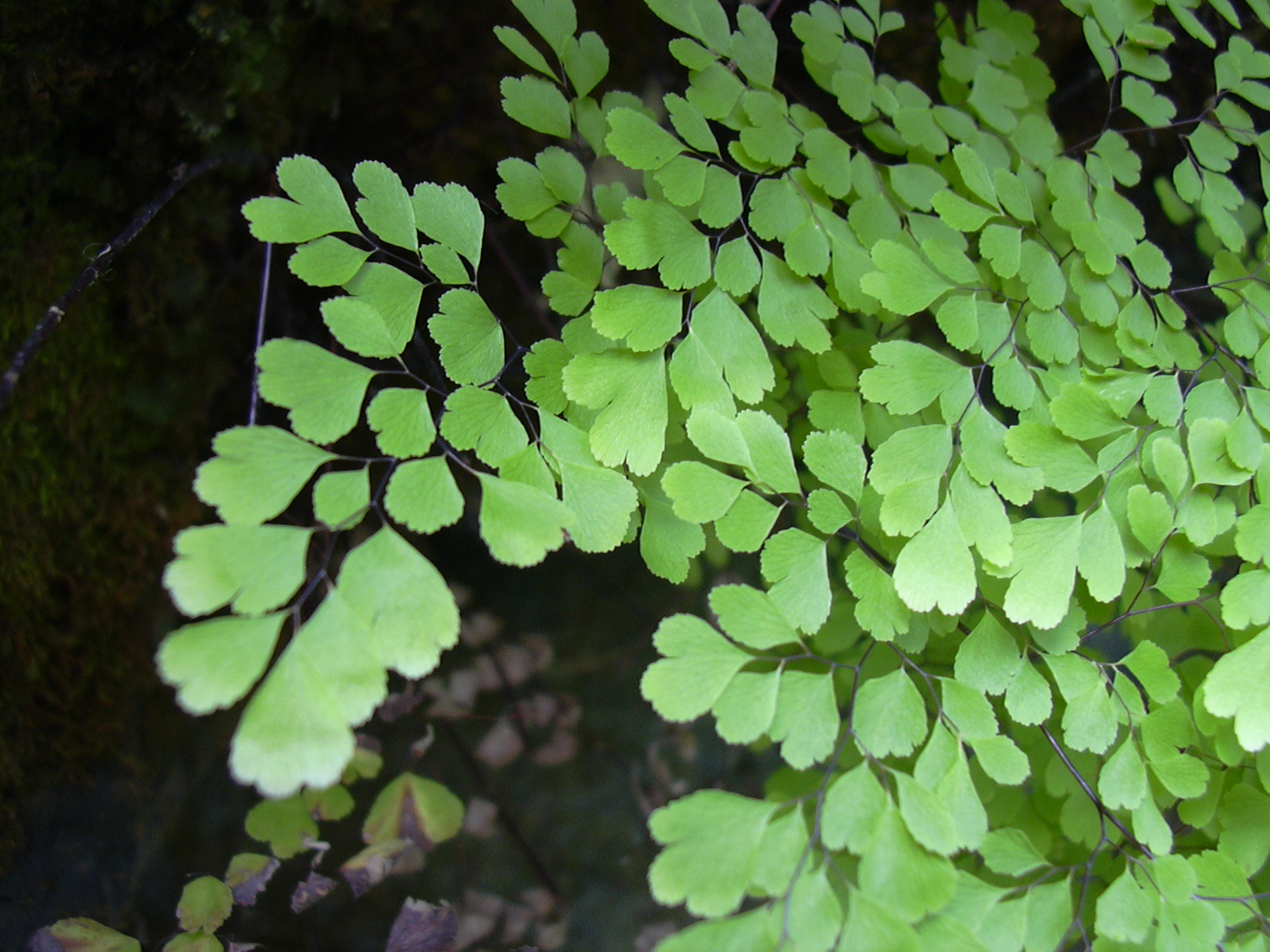

Conservation status
- Secure (NatureServe)

Scientific classification
- Kingdom: Plantae
- Clade: Tracheophytes
- Division: Polypodiophyta
- Class: Polypodiopsida
- Order: Polypodiales
- Family: Pteridaceae
- Genus: Adiantum
- Species: A. raddianum

Binomial name
- Adiantum raddianum C.Presl

Synonyms
- List: Adiantum aemulum T.Moore; Adiantum baenitzii Rosenst.; Adiantum cuneatum Langsd. & Fisch.; Adiantum cuneatum f. elongatum Rosenst.; Adiantum cuneatum var. majus Baker; Adiantum cuneatum var. subintegrum Hieron.; Adiantum cuneatum f. typicum Hieron.; Adiantum cuneatum var. vastum Rosenst.; Adiantum cuneipinnulum N.C.Nair & S.R.Ghosh; Adiantum cyclosorum T.Moore; Adiantum decorum T.Moore; Adiantum mexicanum C.Presl; Adiantum rubellum T.Moore; Adiantum weigandii T.Moore; Adiantum werckleanum Christ

= Adiantum raddianum =

Species of fern

Adiantum raddianum, the Delta maidenhair fern, is one of the most popular ferns to grow indoors. It is native to South America and its common name comes from its shiny, dark leafstalks that resemble human hair. It typically grows about 17–19 in (43–48 cm) tall and up to 22 in (56 cm) wide. In the wild, it is found on forest floors, rock crevices, river banks, coastal cliffs, and basalt banks along trails and streams. The triangular fronds are semi-erect in the beginning then droop gracefully as they age and can be up to 12 inches (30 cm) long by 6 inches (15 cm) wide. The genus name Adiantum comes from the Greek word "adiantos", meaning "unwetted" (in reference to the leaves).

This plant is hardy down to 5 °C (41 °F), so must be grown indoors in temperate regions. However it may be placed outside in a sheltered spot during the summer months. It requires high humidity, well-drained soil, bright indirect light, and a fairly constant temperature. It prefers neutral or slightly alkaline soil and is suitable for USDA hardiness zones 10 and 11. It can be susceptible to scale and mealybug. The cultivars ‘Brilliantelse’ and ‘Kensington Gem’ have won the Royal Horticultural Society's Award of Garden Merit.

A. raddianum is sometimes considered invasive in Hawaii and French Polynesia.

== Gallery ==
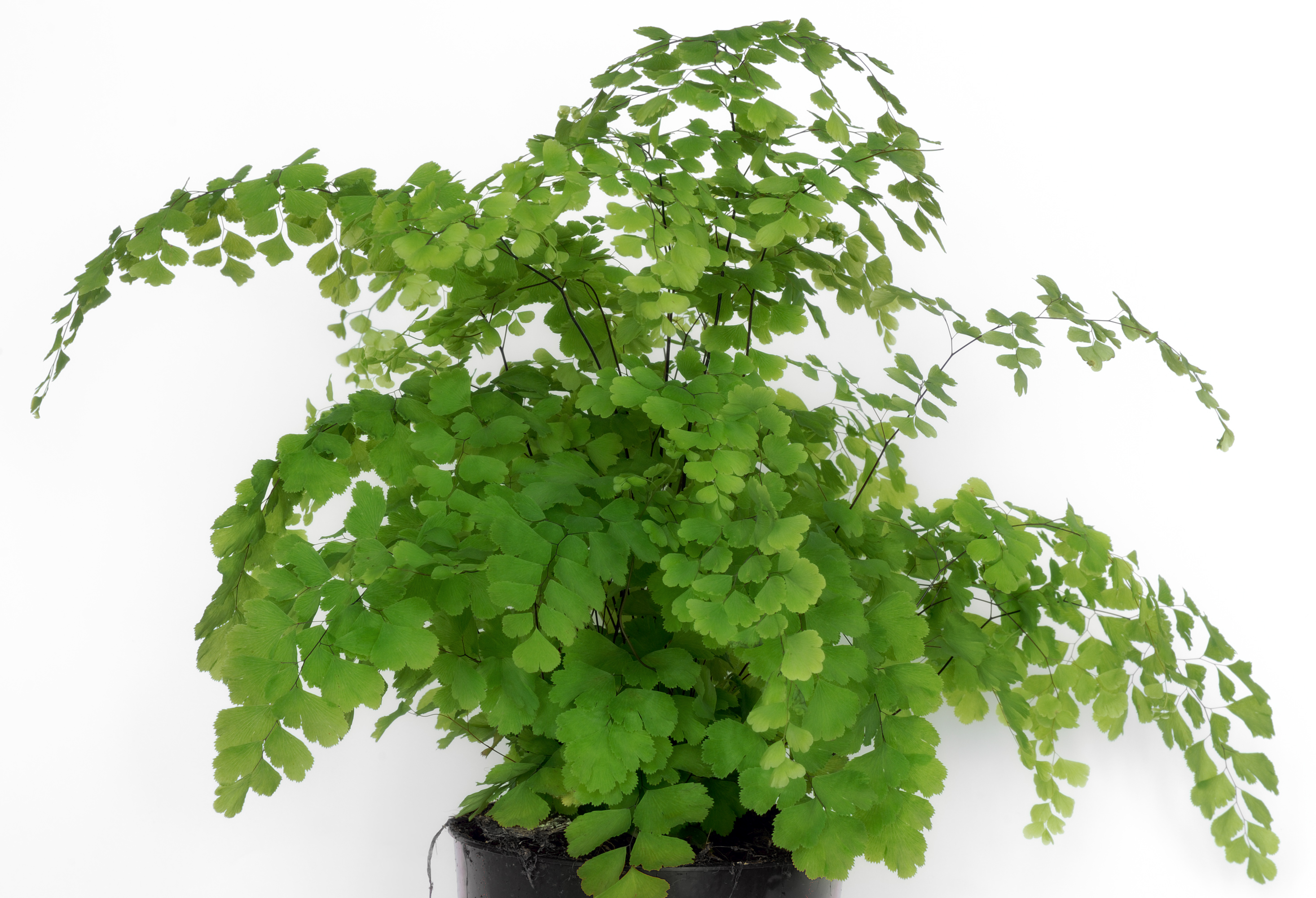

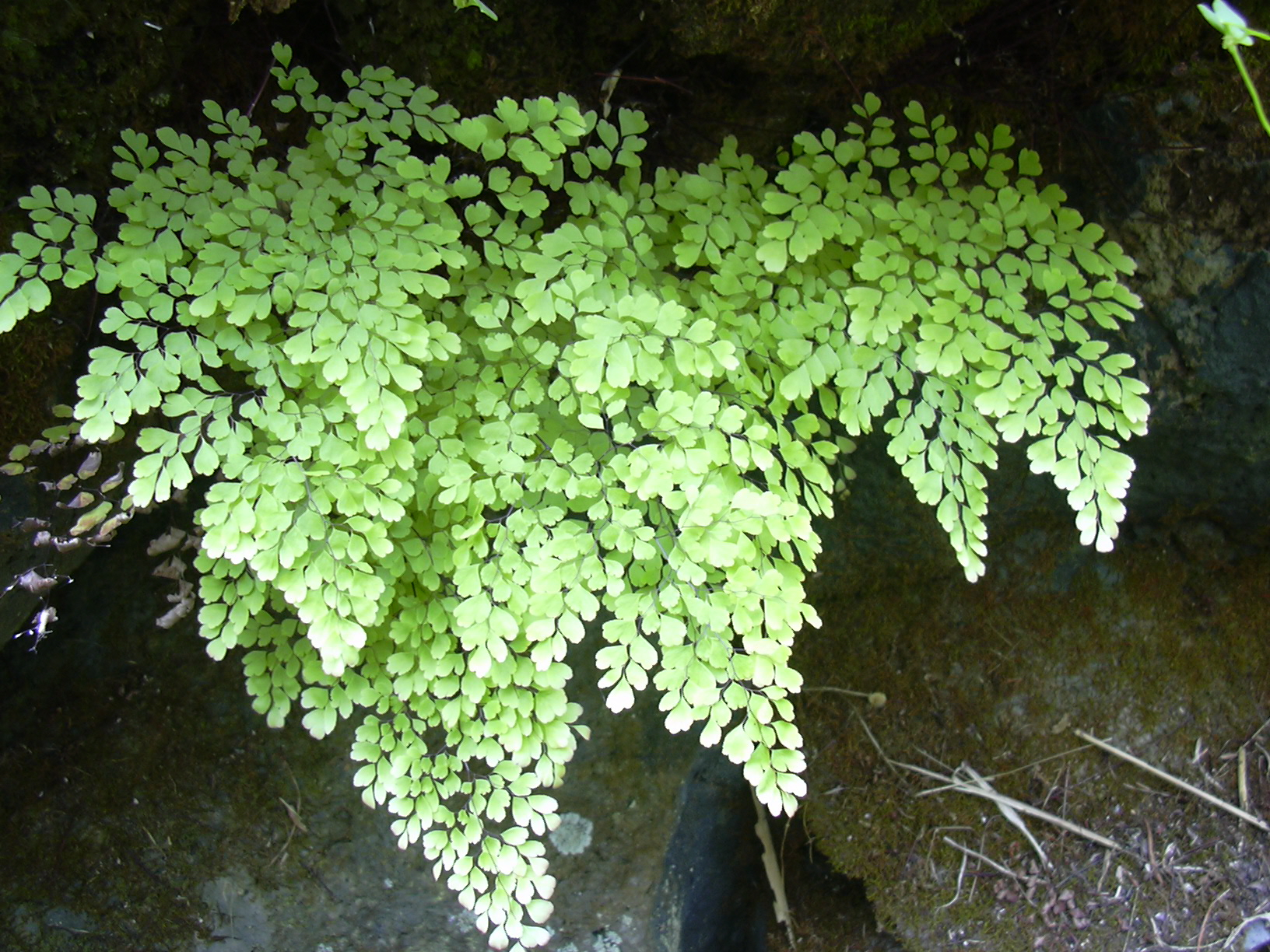

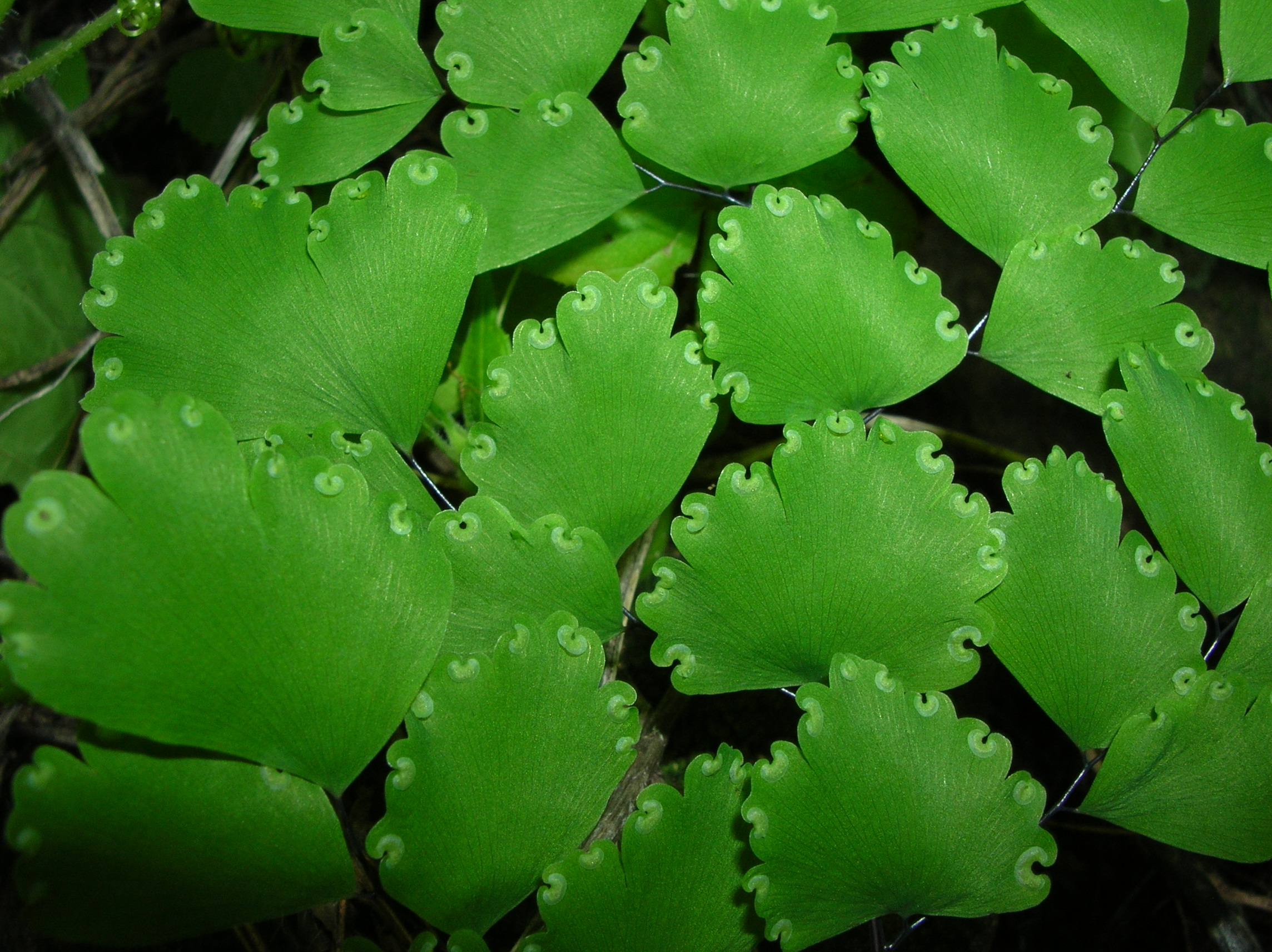
