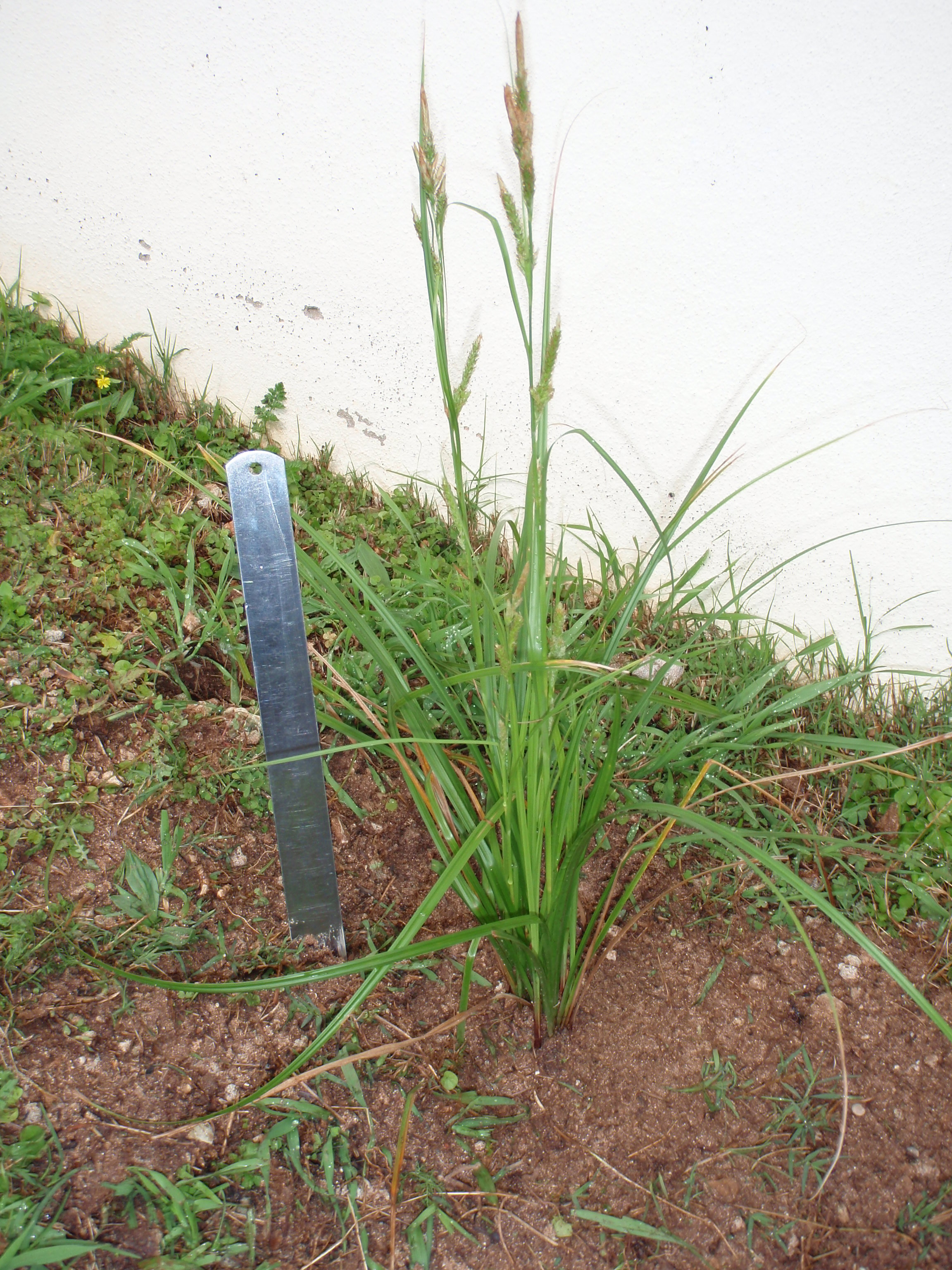

Conservation status
- Endangered (IUCN 3.1)

Scientific classification
- Kingdom: Plantae
- Clade: Tracheophytes
- Clade: Angiosperms
- Clade: Monocots
- Clade: Commelinids
- Order: Poales
- Family: Cyperaceae
- Genus: Carex
- Species: C. bermudiana

Binomial name
- Carex bermudiana Hemsl.

= Carex bermudiana =

Species of grass-like plant

Carex bermudiana, the Bermuda sedge, is a sedge in the family Cyperaceae. It is endemic to the islands of Bermuda. It is found on damp forest floors and in peat marshes and has become extremely rare. The Bermuda sedge was listed on the IUCN Red List of Threatened Species in November 2014 with Endangered status. This species is listed on the Bermuda Protected Species Act.
