= Jiro Adachi =

Japanese American novelist

- Born: October 14, 1965; New York City

Jiro Adachi (born October 14, 1965) is an American writer best known for his novel The Island of Bicycle Dancers (2004).

Jiro Adachi was born on October 14, 1965 in New York City, the son of a Japanese father and a Hungarian mother. He earned a BA in English from Columbia University and an MFA in creative writing from Colorado State University. He taught English, English as a second language, and writing at a number of schools, including Colorado State University, Hunter College, Lycée Français de New York, the New School, Stern College for Women, and the School of Visual Arts. He also worked as a bicycle messenger.

The Island of Bicycle Dancers is about Yurika Song, a half-Japanese half-Korean woman from Kawasaki whose rebellious nature causes her parents to send her to live with her Korean uncle in New York City. In New York, Yurika is overwhelmed by the "too many different kinds of English" used by the many diasporic communities in Manhattan, calling the language "a huge octopus...with so many wild and beautiful limbs writhing about." She learns English slang from her rebellious cousin Suzie and is disliked by her aunt, Hyun Jeong. She works in her uncle's East Village convenience store and encounters a number of bicycle messengers. She befriends one of them, Whitey, an Ivy League drop-out, and has a relationship with Hector, a Puerto Rican bicycle messenger nicknamed named Bone. The novel was favorably reviewed by Publisher's Weekly, The Asian Reporter, Kirkus Reviews, Booklist, and Library Journal.

He also contributed the essay "Writing that Sings" to the book Rules of Thumb : 73 authors reveal their fiction writing fixations (2006) by Michael Martone and Susan Neville.

== Bibliography ==
- The Island of Bicycle Dancers (2004)
