= Lena B. Smithers Hughes =

American botanist

Lena B. Smithers Hughes (June 8, 1905 – December 19, 1987) was an American botanist who developed improved strains of the Valencia orange, a sweet orange that is grown in the United States mainly for the production of commercial orange juice. She was the first woman inducted into the Florida Agricultural Hall of Fame and was also named to the Florida Women's Hall of Fame and the Florida Citrus Hall of Fame.

== Biography ==
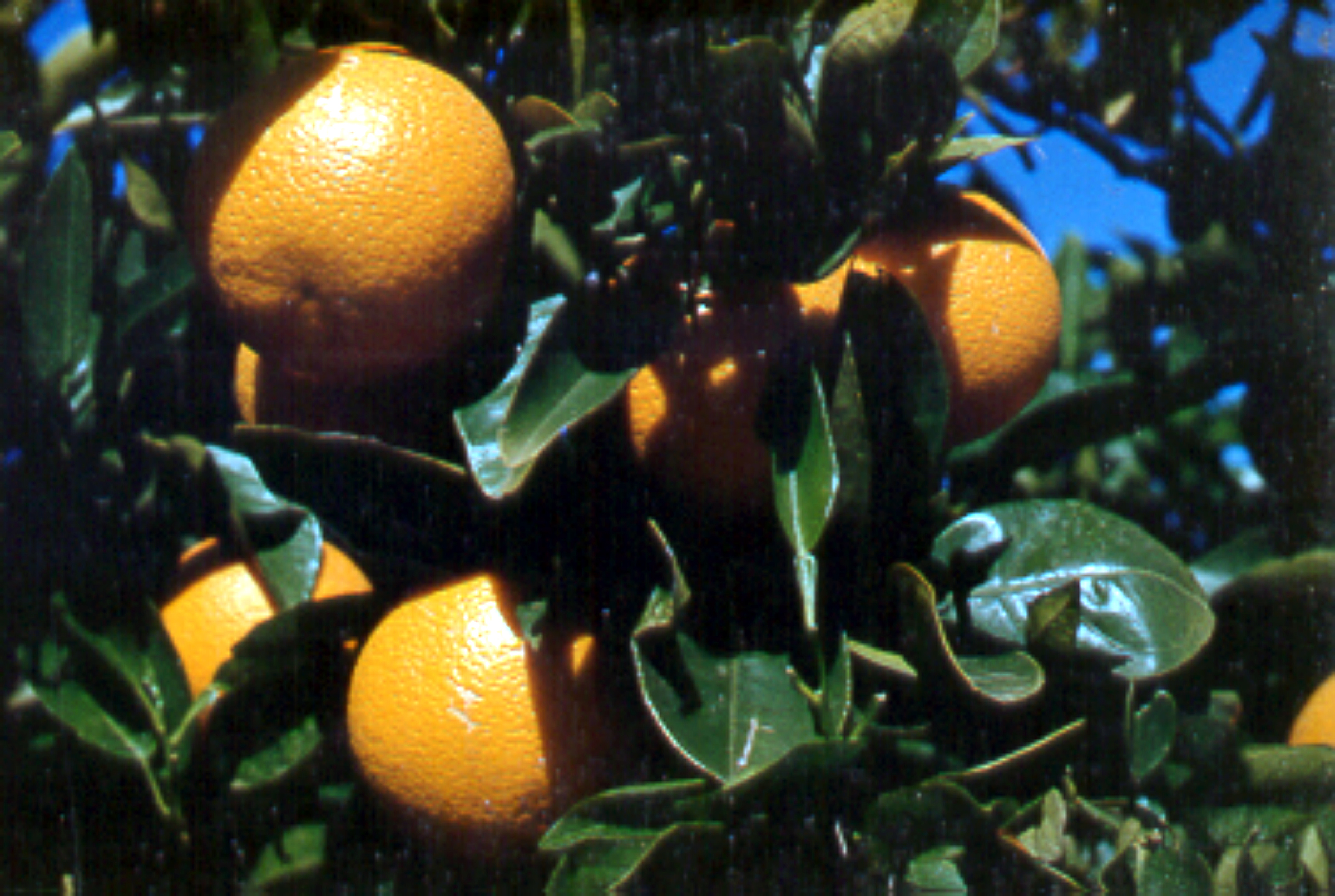
Valencia oranges on the tree

Lena B. Smithers was born June 8, 1905, in Elgin, Tennessee. She earned degrees from both the University of Tennessee and Wayne State University, Michigan, after which she taught school for a time.

In 1931, she and her husband Ausker Hughes, a chemist, moved to Lake County, Florida, where they both worked on citrus research. By 1935, they had 75 acres of test groves under production. Together they developed a number of new orange strains that are precursors of widely planted present-day varieties, working especially with nucellar seedlings of Parson Brown and Valencia oranges.

After Ausker died in 1944, Hughes continued the breeding research on her own, eventually settling near Orlando in Orange County. This research led to improved, virus-free varieties of the Valencia orange, which had originally been developed by American agronomist William Wolfskill in the mid-19th century. These virus-free strains were used to produce budwood for growers with such success that by 1983, her Hughes Valencia bud line made up some 60 percent of all Valencia oranges propagated for cultivation in Florida. Her work on Valencia oranges has been called "one of the most significant citrus developments" to originate in Orange County, then one of the nation's major orange-growing regions. She was the first woman member of the Orange County Citrus Extension Advisory Committee—serving ten years in that capacity—and likewise the first woman member of the Growers Administrative Committee.

In 1960, using money from sales of her Hughes Valencia budwood, Hughes set up the Hughes Memorial Foundation to provide horticulture scholarships at both the University of Florida and Florida Southern College in Lakeland. She was inducted into the Florida Women's Hall of Fame in 1984 and in 1986 became the first woman named to the Florida Agricultural Hall of Fame.

In a pair of bad winter freezes in 1984 and 1985, Hughes's last 150 acres of oranges were wiped out and she decided not to replant, knowing that it would take ten years before she could turn a profit and suspecting she did not have that much time left. She died on December 19, 1987. Five years later she was inducted into the Florida Citrus Hall of Fame.
