= Conrad Center =

Museum in DeLand, Florida, US

Coordinates: 29.0337°N 81.3052°W

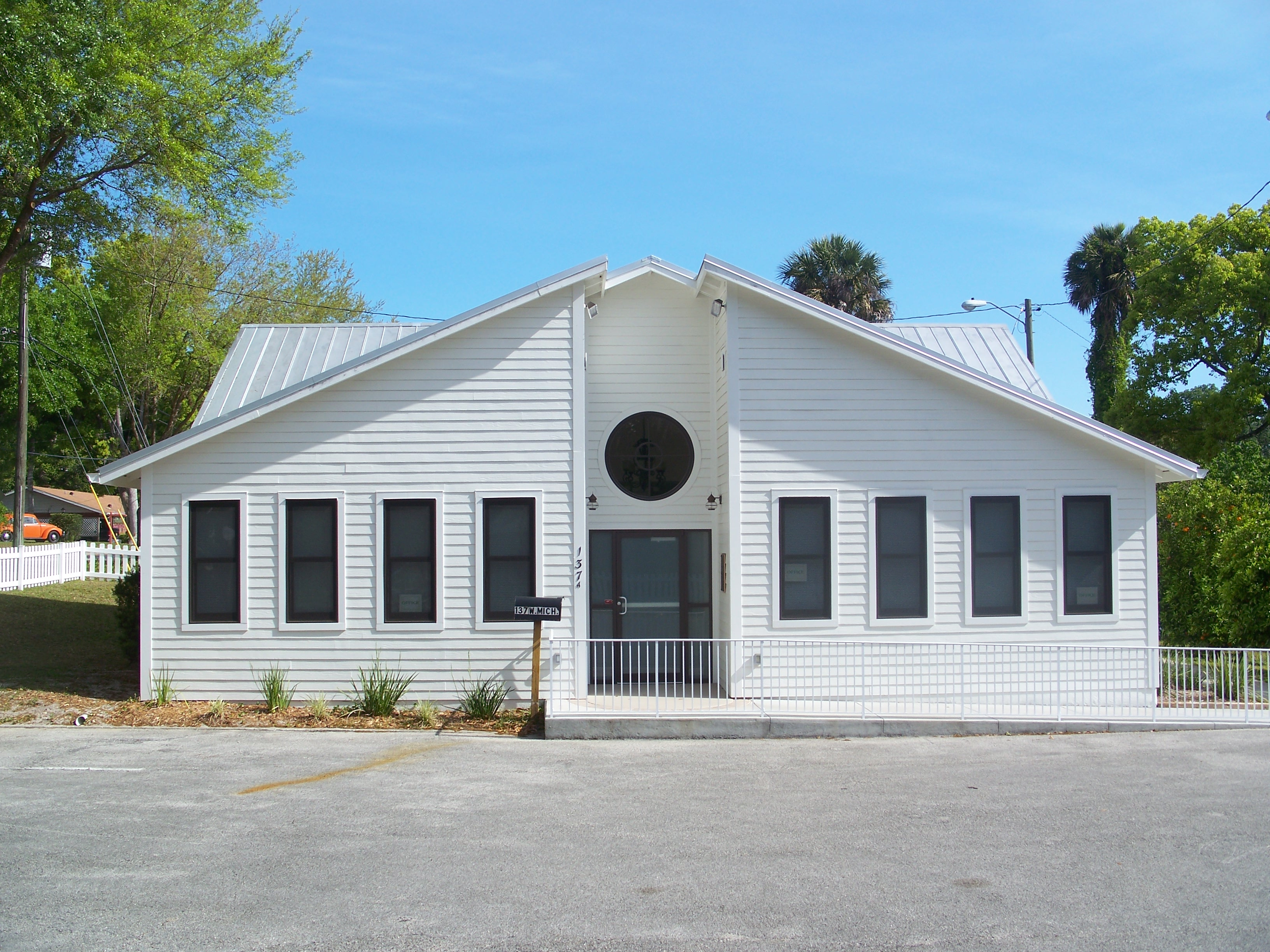

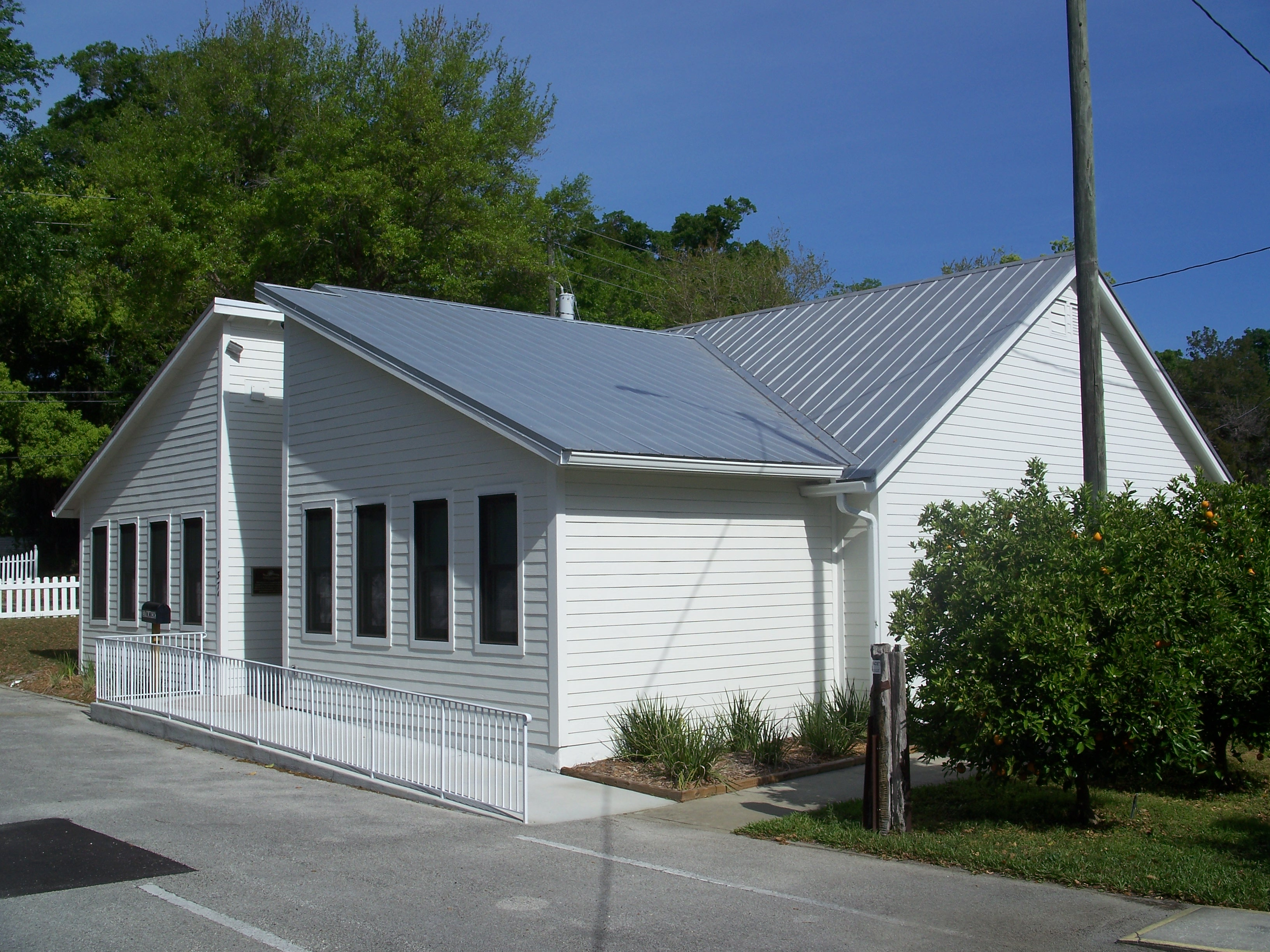

Conrad Center, also known as The Robert M. Conrad Research and Educational Center, is a museum operated by the West Volusia Historical Society in DeLand, Florida. It was built in 1997 by Mrs. Hawtense Conrad in honor of her late husband Robert. It includes exhibition space, a library, and space for meetings, classes and lectures. The collection includes approximately 100 oral history videos. The Conrad Center is part of a complex that also includes the Henry A. DeLand House Museum and Lue Gim Gong Memorial Garden (named for Lue Gim Gong). It is located at 137 West Michigan Avenue.
