= Valencia orange =

Sweet orange cultivar

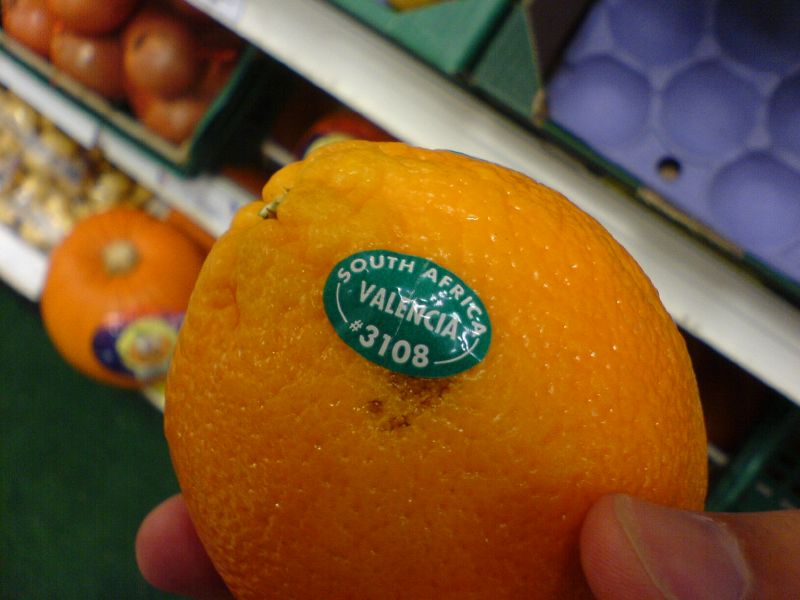
- Valencia orange
- Species: Citrus × sinensis
- Cultivar: 'Valencia'

The Valencia orange, also known as Valencia Late, is a late-ripening sweet orange cultivar. Its name refers to the orange-growing region of Valencia, Spain, although the variety was introduced to California from England in the 19th century. It is well known for its soft sweet taste.

== History ==
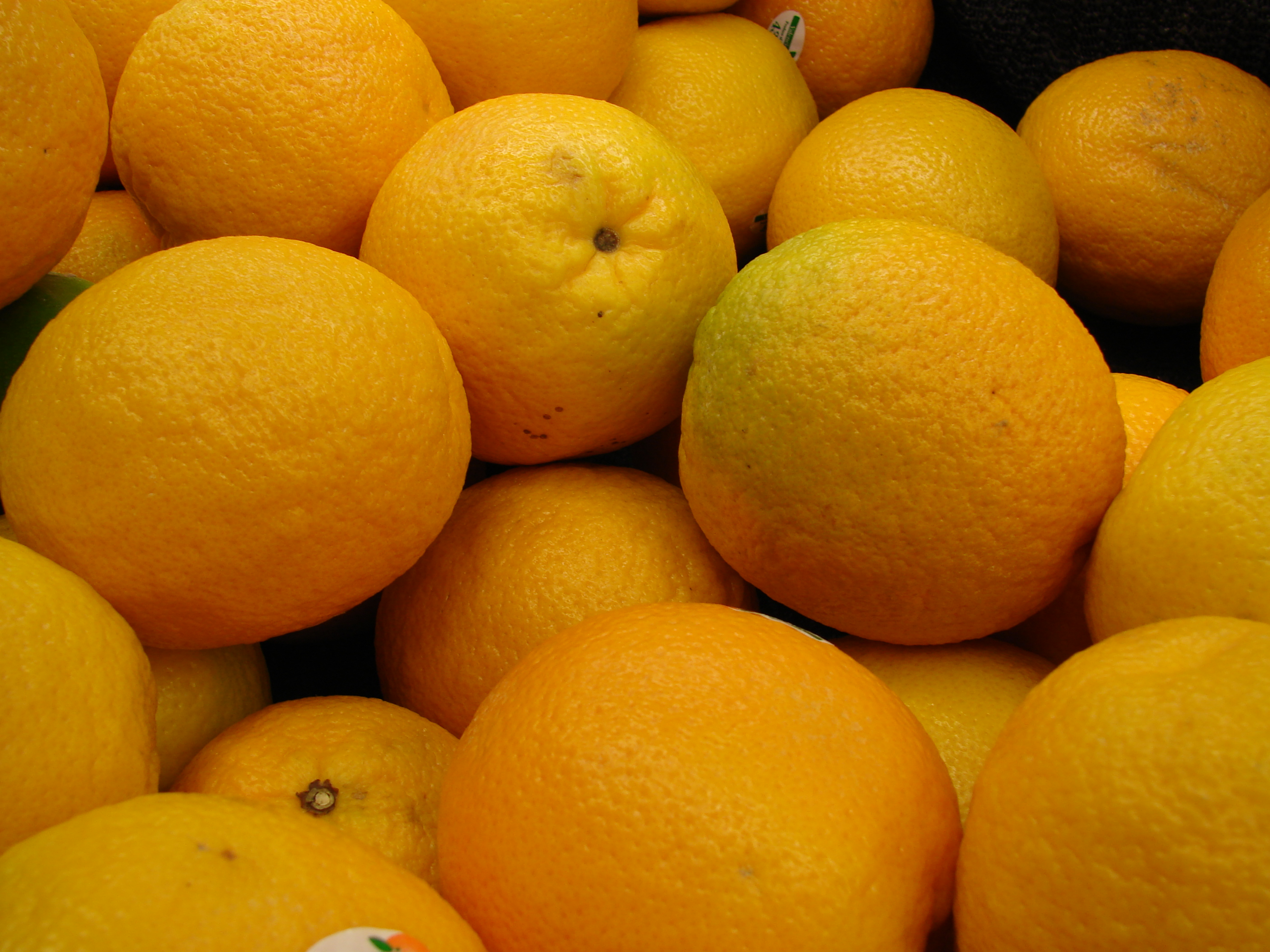
Valencia oranges for sale.

The history of the Valencia orange cultivar can be traced to the Azores. The English nurseryman Thomas Rivers of Sawbridgeworth imported the variety from the islands and listed it in his 1865 catalogue under the name Excelsior. Around 1870, Rivers supplied trees to S. B. Parsons, a nurseryman on Long Island, New York. In 1876, he also sent trees to A. B. Chapman of San Gabriel, California.

The trees received by Chapman were initially unlabeled. One late-ripening selection became known as Rivers Late, before Chapman renamed it Valencia Late at the suggestion of a visitor from Spain who considered it similar to a late-ripening orange grown near Valencia. Meanwhile, trees supplied through Parsons reached E. H. Hart of Federal Point, Florida, where the variety acquired the name Hart's Tardiff in 1877.

The Valencia orange subsequently became an important commercial crop in California, valued for its flavor and late harvest season. It was the state's most widely grown citrus fruit until 1970, when navel oranges regained the lead.

In the mid-20th century, Florida botanist Lena B. Smithers Hughes introduced major improvements to the Valencia orange, developing virus-free strains for budwood production. These were so successful that, by 1983, the Hughes Valencia bud line made up some 60 percent of all Valencia oranges propagated for cultivation in Florida.

In 1988, Merleen Smith, a woman in Ventura County, California, contacted her local farm advisor on the suspicion that her neighbor was poisoning her tree. Investigators found that it was a pigmented bud sport of a conventional Valencia orange tree. The orange cultivar 'Smith Red Valencia' (with red insides) now bears her name.

== Description ==
Primarily grown for processing and orange juice production, Valencia oranges have seeds, varying in number from zero to nine per fruit. Its excellent taste and internal color make it desirable for the fresh fruit markets, too. The fruit has an average diameter of 2.7 to 3 inches (69 to 76 mm; 6.9 to 7.6 cm), and a piece of this fruit which weighs 96 grams (3.4 oz) has 45 calories and 9 grams of sugar. After bloom, it usually carries two crops on the tree, the old and the new. The commercial harvest season in Florida runs from March to June. Valencia oranges can also be harvested during summer in California.

In 2012, the genome of the orange was sequenced, and was found to have 29,445 protein-coding genes. It was also found that the sweet orange originated from a backcross hybrid between pomelo and mandarin orange.

The Valencia orange undergoes nucellar embryony in both fertilized and unfertilized conditions of the ovule.

== Cultivars ==
=== Hamlin ===
This cultivar was discovered by A. G. Hamlin near Glenwood, Florida, in 1879. The fruit is small, smooth, not highly colored, and juicy, with a pale yellow colored juice, especially in fruits that come from lemon rootstock. The fruit may be seedless, or may contain a number of small seeds. The tree is high-yielding and cold-tolerant and it produces good quality fruit, which is harvested from October to December. It thrives in humid subtropical climates. In cooler, more arid areas, the trees produce fruit too small for commercial use. Trees from groves in hammocks or areas covered with pine forest are budded on sour orange trees, a method that gives a high solids content. On sand, they are grafted on rough lemon rootstock. The Hamlin orange has been one of the most popular juice oranges in Florida and replaced the Parson Brown variety as the principal early-season juice orange.

=== Other Valencias ===
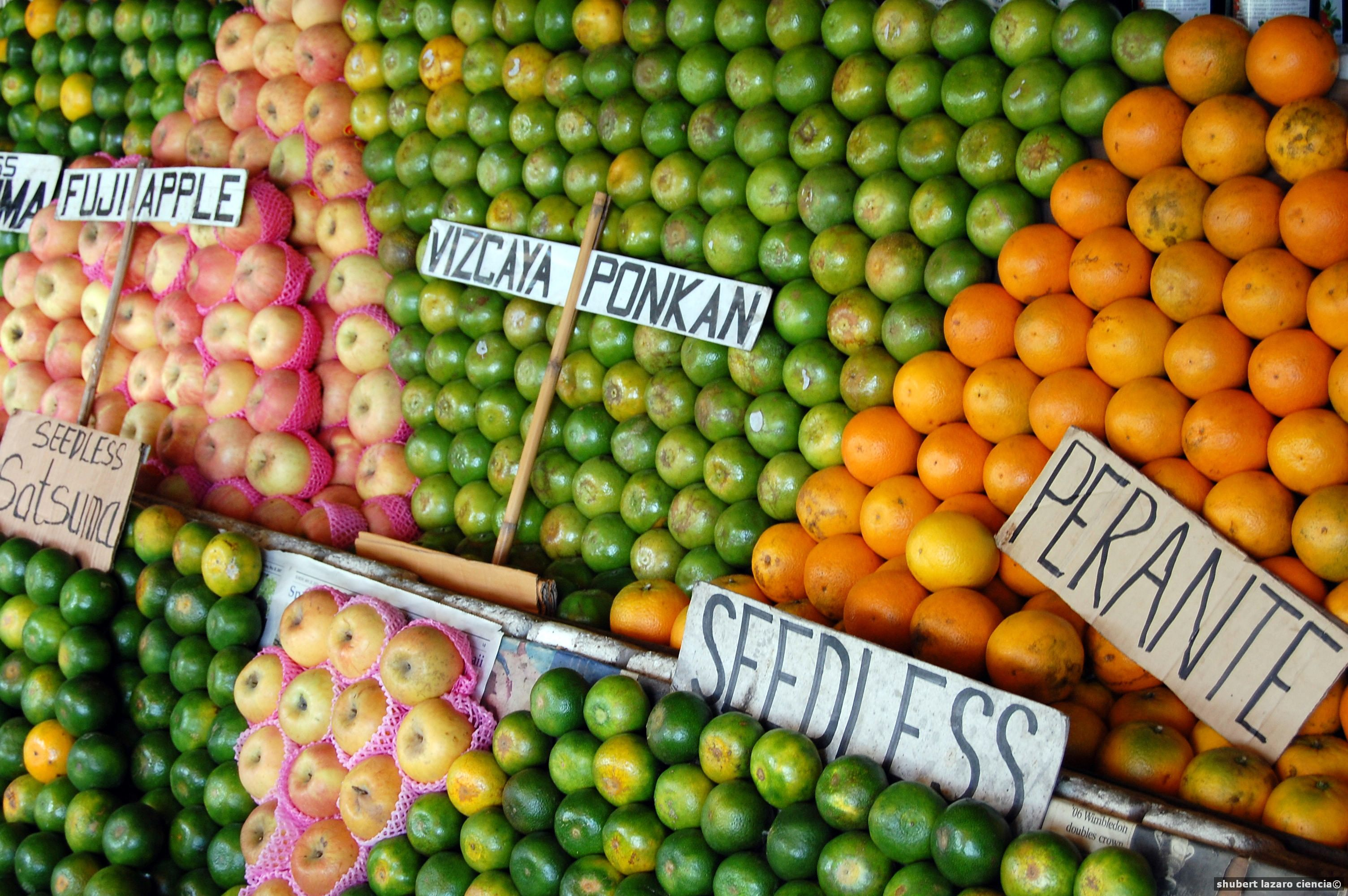
A variety of oranges being sold at a market in the Philippines

Bahia: grown in Brazil and Uruguay

Bali: grown in Bali, Indonesia. Larger than other orange

Belladonna: grown in Italy

Berna: grown mainly in Spain

Biondo Comune ("ordinary blond"): widely grown in the Mediterranean basin, especially in North Africa, Egypt, Greece (where it is called "koines"), Italy (where it is also known as "Liscio"), and Spain; it also is called "Beledi" and "Nostrale"; in Italy, this variety ripens in December, earlier than the competing Tarocco variety

Biondo Riccio: grown in Italy

Cadanera: a seedless orange of excellent flavor grown in Algeria, Morocco, and Spain; it begins to ripen in November and is known by a wide variety of trade names, such as Cadena Fina, Cadena sin Jueso, Precoce de Valence ("early from Valencia"), Precoce des Canaries, and Valence san Pepins ("seedless Valencia"); it was first grown in Spain in 1870

Calabrese or Calabrese Ovale: grown in Italy

Carvalhal: grown in Portugal

Castellana: grown in Spain

Charmute: grown in Brazil

Cherry Orange: grown in southern China and Japan

Clanor: grown in South Africa

Dom João: grown in Portugal

Fukuhara: grown in Japan

Gardner: grown in Florida, this mid-season orange ripens around the beginning of February, approximately the same time as the Midsweet variety; Gardner is about as hardy as Sunstar and Midsweet

Homosassa: grown in Florida

Jaffa orange: grown in the Middle East, also known as "Shamouti"

Jincheng: the most popular orange in China

Joppa: grown in South Africa and Texas

Khettmali: grown in Israel and Lebanon

A cross cutting scan of the interior of an orange

Lima: grown in Brazil

Lue Gim Gong: grown in Florida, is an early scion developed by Lue Gim Gong, a Chinese immigrant known as the "Citrus Genius"; in 1888, Lue cross-pollinated two orange varieties—the Hart's late Valencia and the Mediterranean Sweet—and obtained a fruit both sweet and frost-tolerant; this variety was propagated at the Glen St. Mary Nursery, which in 1911 received the Silver Wilder Medal by the American Pomological Society; originally considered a hybrid, the Lue Gim Gong orange was later found to be a nucellar seedling of the Valencia type, which is properly called Lue Gim Gong; since 2006, the Lue Gim Gong variety is grown in Florida, although sold under the general name Valencia

Macetera: grown in Spain, it is known for its unique flavor

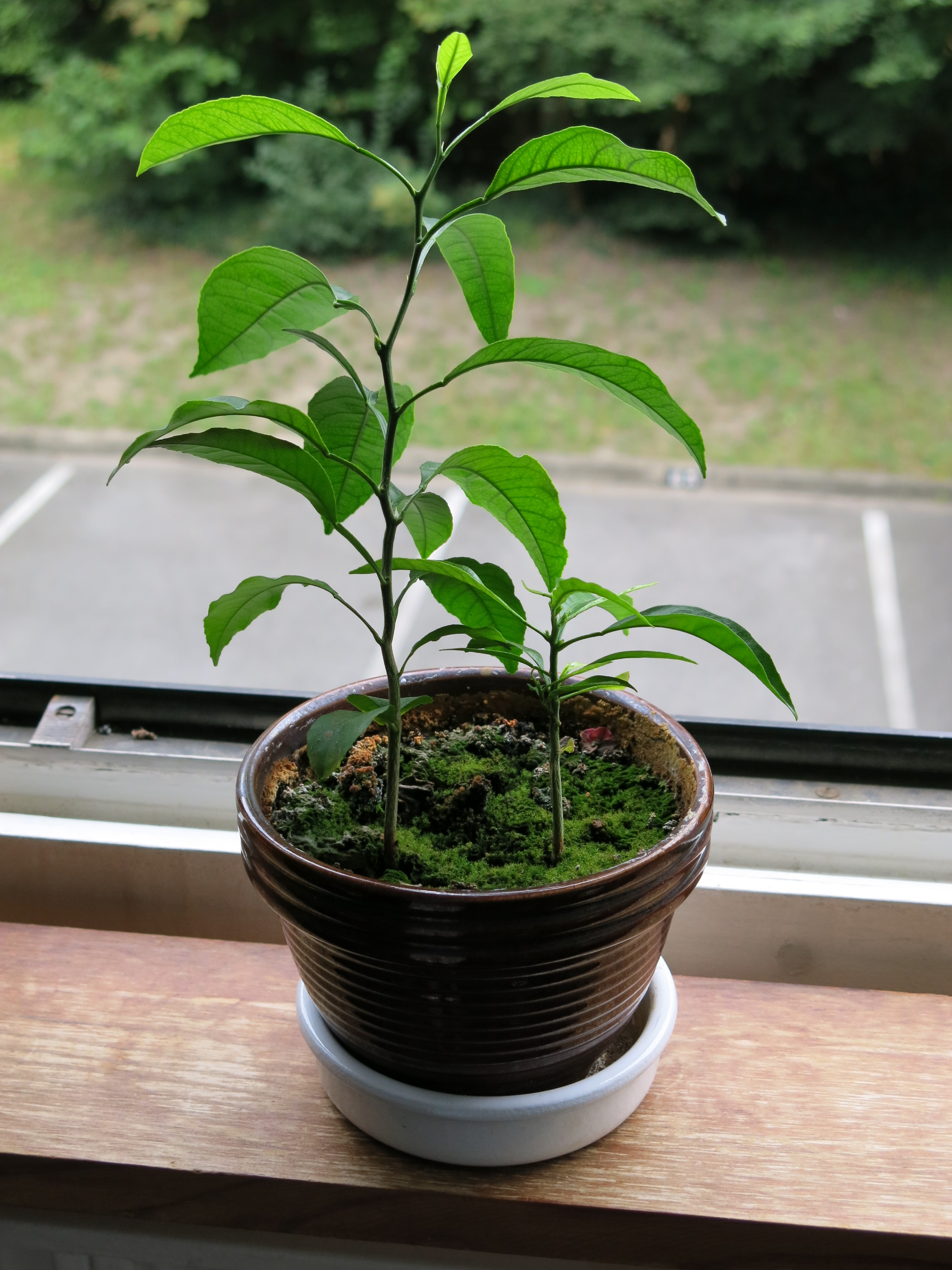
Orange seedling—although hybrid, oranges usually come true from seed, through maternal apomixis.

Malta: grown in Pakistan

Maltaise Blonde: grown in north Africa

Maltaise Ovale: grown in South Africa and in California under the names of Garey's or California Mediterranean Sweet

Marrs: grown in Texas, California and Iran, it is relatively low in acid

Medan: grown in Medan, Indonesia

Midsweet: grown in Florida, it is a newer scion similar to the Hamlin and Pineapple varieties, it is hardier than Pineapple and ripens later; the fruit production and quality are similar to those of the Hamlin, but the juice has a deeper color

Moro: grown in Italy, it is oval, resembles a tangelo, and has a distinctive caramel-colored endocarp; this color is the result of a pigment called anthocyanins, not usually found in citruses, but common in red fruits and flowers; the original mutation occurred in Sicily in the seventeenth century

Tarocco: blood orange distinct from Moro; pigmentation likewise from anthocyanins

Narinja: grown in Andhra, South India

Parson Brown: grown in Florida, Mexico, and Turkey, it once was a widely grown Florida juice orange, its popularity has declined since new varieties with more juice, better yield, and higher acid and sugar content have been developed; it originated as a chance seedling in Florida in 1865; its fruits are round, medium large, have a thick, pebbly peel and contain 10 to 30 seeds; it still is grown because it is the earliest maturing fruit in the United States, usually maturing in early September in the Valley district of Texas, and from early October to January in Florida; its peel and juice color are poor, as is the quality of its juice

Pera: grown in Brazil, it is very popular in the Brazilian citrus industry and yielded 7.5 million metric tons in 2005

Pera Coroa: grown in Brazil

Pera Natal: grown in Brazil

Pera Rio: grown in Brazil

Pineapple: grown in North and South America and India

Pontianak: oval-shaped orange grown especially in Pontianak, Indonesia

Premier: grown in South Africa

Rhode Red: is a mutation of the Valencia orange, but the color of its flesh is more intense; it has more juice, and less acidity and vitamin C than the Valencia; it was discovered by Paul Rhode in 1955 in a grove near Sebring, Florida

Roble: it was first shipped from Spain in 1851 by Joseph Roble to his homestead in what is now Roble's Park in Tampa, Florida; it is known for its high sugar content

Queen: grown in South Africa

Salustiana: grown in North Africa

Sathgudi: grown in Tamil Nadu, South India

Seleta, Selecta: grown in Australia and Brazil, it is high in acid

Shamouti Masry: grown in Egypt; it is a richer variety of Shamouti

Sunstar: grown in Florida, this newer cultivar ripens in mid-season (December to March) and it is more resistant to cold and fruit-drop than the competing Pineapple variety; the color of its juice is darker than that of the competing Hamlin

Tomango: grown in South Africa

Verna: grown in Algeria, Mexico, Morocco, and Spain

Vicieda: grown in Algeria, Morocco, and Spain

Westin: grown in Brazil

Xã Đoài orange: grown in Vietnam

== See also ==
- California Citrus State Historic Park
- Eliza Tibbets
- Laraha
- Mother Orange Tree
- Midknight Valencia Orange
