= Apomixis =

Asexual development of seed in botany

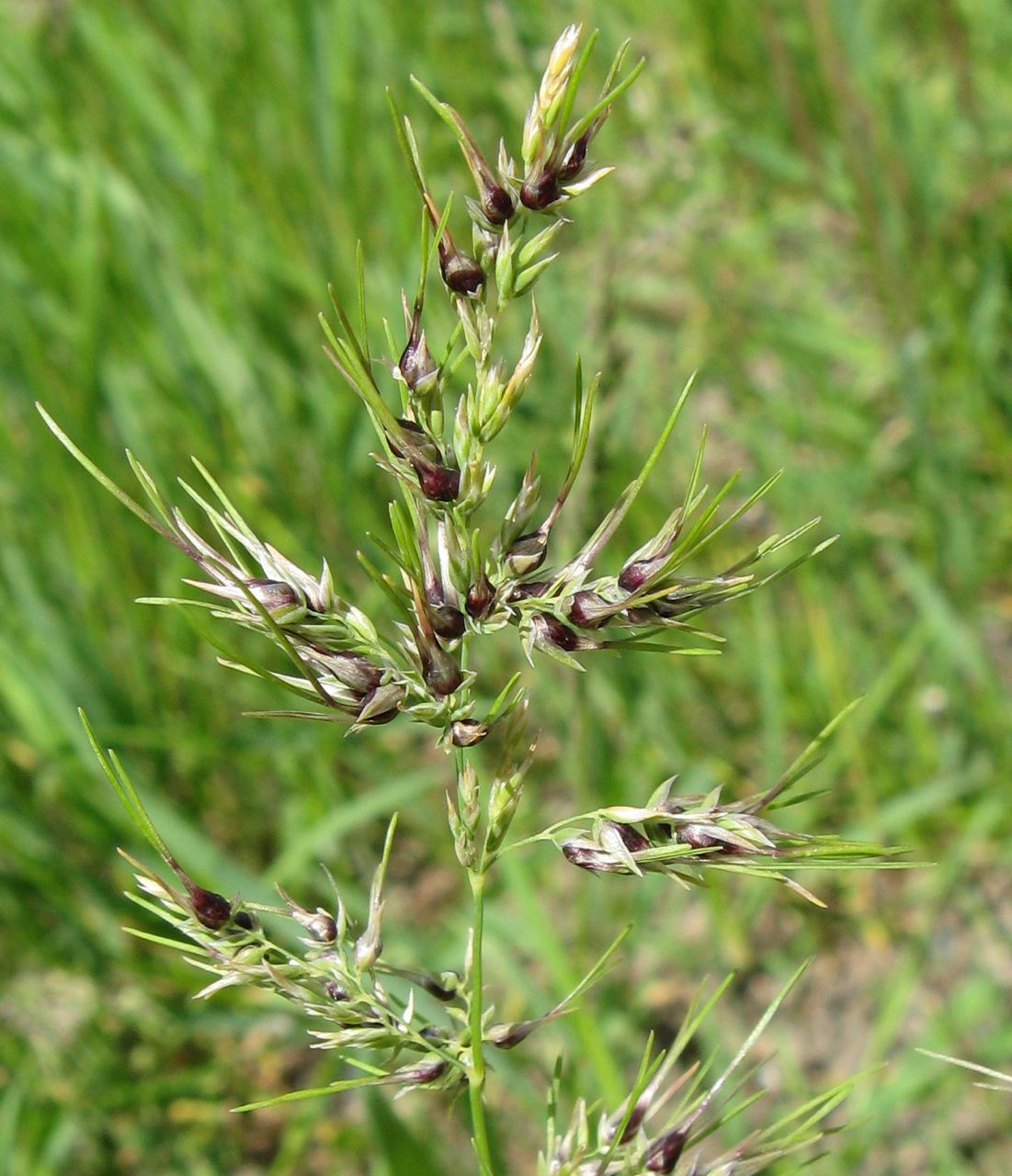
Vegetative apomixis in Poa bulbosa; bulbils form instead of flowers

In botany, apomixis is asexual development of seed or embryo without fertilization.

Apomictically produced offspring are genetically identical to the parent plant, except in nonrecurrent apomixis. Its etymology is Greek for ἀπο- (apo-) "away from" and μίξις (míxis) "mixing".

Normal asexual reproduction of plants, such as propagation from cuttings or leaves, has never been considered to be apomixis. In contrast to parthenocarpy, which involves seedless fruit formation without fertilization, apomictic fruits have viable seeds containing a proper embryo, with asexual origin.

In flowering plants, the term "apomixis" is used in a restricted sense to mean agamospermy, i.e. clonal reproduction through seeds. Although agamospermy could theoretically occur in gymnosperms, it appears to be absent in that group.

Apogamy is a related term with a distinct meaning in plant reproduction. In plants with independent gametophyte generations, particularly ferns, apogamy refers to the development of a sporophyte directly from a cell or cells of the gametophyte without fertilization. This process is described mainly in lower plants, especially ferns, but shares certain features with apomixis in angiosperms. In contrast, apomixis in flowering plants generally refers to seed formation without fertilization (agamospermy), and the term is not typically used interchangeably with apogamy in modern usage.

== Evolution ==
Because apomictic plants are genetically identical from one generation to the next, each lineage has some of the characters of a true species, maintaining distinctions from other apomictic lineages within the same genus, while having much smaller differences than is normal between species of most genera. They are therefore often called microspecies. In some genera, it is possible to identify and name hundreds or even thousands of microspecies, which may be grouped together as species aggregates, typically listed in floras with the convention "Genus species agg." (such as the bramble, Rubus fruticosus agg.). In some plant families, genera with apomixis are quite common, for example in Asteraceae, Poaceae, and Rosaceae. Examples of apomixis can be found in the genera Crataegus (hawthorns), Amelanchier (shadbush), Sorbus (rowans and whitebeams), Rubus (brambles or blackberries), Poa (meadow grasses), Nardus stricta (matgrass), Hieracium (hawkweeds) and Taraxacum (dandelions). Apomixis is reported to occur in about 10% of globally extant ferns. Among polystichoid ferns, apomixis evolved several times independently in three different clades.

Although the evolutionary advantages of sexual reproduction are lost, apomixis can pass along traits fortuitous for evolutionary fitness. As Jens Clausen put it:

The apomicts actually have discovered the effectiveness of mass production long before Mr. Henry Ford applied it to the production of the automobile. ... Facultative apomixis ... does not prevent variation; rather, it multiplies certain varietal products.

Facultative apomixis means that apomixis does not always occur, i.e., sexual reproduction can also happen. It appears likely that all apomixis in plants is facultative; in other words, that "obligate apomixis" is an artifact of insufficient observation (missing uncommon sexual reproduction).

== Apogamy and apospory in non-flowering plants ==
The gametophytes of bryophytes, and less commonly ferns and lycopods can develop a group of cells that grow to look like a sporophyte of the species but with the ploidy level of the gametophyte, a phenomenon known as apogamy. The sporophytes of plants of these groups may also have the ability to form a plant that looks like a gametophyte but with the ploidy level of the sporophyte, a phenomenon known as apospory.

See also androgenesis and androclinesis described below, a type of male apomixis that occurs in a conifer, Cupressus dupreziana.

== In flowering plants (angiosperms) ==
Agamospermy, asexual reproduction through seeds, occurs in flowering plants through many different mechanisms and a simple hierarchical classification of the different types is not possible. Consequently, there are almost as many different usages of terminology for apomixis in angiosperms as there are authors on the subject. For English speakers, Maheshwari 1950 is very influential. German speakers might prefer to consult Rutishauser 1967. Some older text books on the basis of misinformation (that the egg cell in a meiotically unreduced gametophyte can never be fertilized) attempted to reform the terminology to match the term parthenogenesis as it is used in zoology, and this continues to cause much confusion.

Agamospermy occurs mainly in two forms: In gametophytic apomixis, the embryo arises from an unfertilized egg cell (i.e. by parthenogenesis) in a gametophyte that was produced from a cell that did not complete meiosis. In adventitious embryony (sporophytic apomixis), an embryo is formed directly (not from a gametophyte) from nucellus or integument tissue

=== Types in flowering plants ===
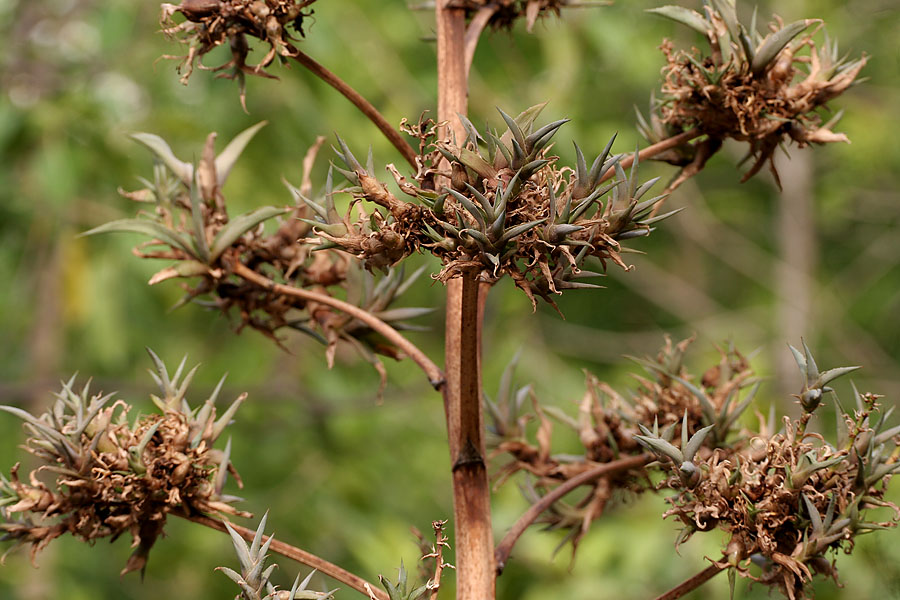
Caribbean agave producing plantlets on the old flower stem.

Maheshwari used the following simple classification of types of apomixis in flowering plants:

- Nonrecurrent apomixis: In this type "the megaspore mother cell undergoes the usual meiotic divisions and a haploid embryo sac megagametophyte is formed. The new embryo may then arise either from the egg (haploid parthenogenesis) or from some other cell of the gametophyte (haploid apogamy)." The haploid plants have half as many chromosomes as the mother plant, and "the process is not repeated from one generation to another" (which is why it is called nonrecurrent). See also parthenogenesis and apogamy below.
- Recurrent apomixis, is now more often called gametophytic apomixis: In this type, the megagametophyte has the same number of chromosomes as the mother plant because meiosis was not completed. It generally arises either from an archesporial cell or from some other part of the nucellus.
- Adventive embryony, also called sporophytic apomixis, sporophytic budding, or nucellar embryony: Here there may be a megagametophyte in the ovule, but the embryos do not arise from the cells of the gametophyte; they arise from cells of nucellus or the integument. Adventive embryony is important in several species of Citrus, in Garcinia, Euphorbia dulcis, Mangifera indica etc.
- Vegetative apomixis: In this type "the flowers are replaced by bulbils or other vegetative propagules which frequently germinate while still on the plant". Vegetative apomixis is important in Allium, Fragaria, Agave, and some grasses, among others.

==== Types of gametophytic apomixis ====
Gametophytic apomixis in flowering plants develops in several different ways. A megagametophyte develops with an egg cell within it that develops into an embryo through parthenogenesis. The central cell of the megagametophyte may require fertilization to form the endosperm, pseudogamous gametophytic apomixis, or in autonomous gametophytic apomixis endosperm fertilization is not required.

- In diplospory (also called generative apospory), the megagametophyte arises from a cell of the archesporium.
- In apospory (also called somatic apospory), the megagametophyte arises from some other (somatic) cell of the nucellus.

Considerable confusion has resulted because diplospory is often defined to involve the megaspore mother cell only, but a number of plant families have a multicellular archesporium and the megagametophyte could originate from another archesporium cell.

Diplospory is further subdivided according to how the megagametophyte forms:

- Allium odorum–A. nutans type. The chromosomes double (endomitosis) and then meiosis proceeds in an unusual way, with the chromosome copies pairing up (rather than the original maternal and paternal copies pairing up).
- Taraxacum type: Meiosis I fails to complete, meiosis II creates two cells, one of which degenerates; three mitotic divisions form the megagametophyte.
- Ixeris type: Meiosis I fails to complete; three rounds of nuclear division occur without cell-wall formation; wall formation then occurs.
- Blumea–Elymus types: A mitotic division is followed by degeneration of one cell; three mitotic divisions form the megagametophyte.
- Antennaria–Hieracium types: three mitotic divisions form the megagametophyte.
- Eragrostis–Panicum types: Two mitotic division give a 4-nucleate megagametophyte, with cell walls to form either three or four cells.

=== Incidence in flowering plants ===
Apomixis occurs in at least 33 families of flowering plants, and has evolved multiple times from sexual relatives. Apomictic species or individual plants often have a hybrid origin, and are usually polyploid.

In plants with both apomictic and meiotic embryology, the proportion of the different types can differ at different times of year, and photoperiod can also change the proportion. It appears unlikely that there are any truly completely apomictic plants, as low rates of sexual reproduction have been found in several species that were previously thought to be entirely apomictic.

The genetic control of apomixis can involve a single genetic change that affects all the major developmental components, formation of the megagametophyte, parthenogenesis of the egg cell, and endosperm development. However, the timing of the various developmental processes is critical to successful development of an apomictic seed, and the timing can be affected by multiple genetic factors.

== Related terms ==
- Apomeiosis: "Without meiosis"; usually meaning the production of a meiotically unreduced gametophyte.
- Parthenogenesis: Development of an embryo directly from an egg cell without fertilization is called parthenogenesis. It is of two types:
  - Haploid parthenogenesis: Parthenogenesis of a normal haploid egg (a meiotically reduced egg) into an embryo is termed haploid parthenogenesis. If the mother plant was diploid, then the haploid embryo that results is monoploid, and the plant that grows from the embryo is sterile. If they are not sterile, they are sometimes useful to plant breeders (especially in potato breeding, see dihaploidy). This type of apomixis has been recorded in Solanum nigrum, Lilium spp., Orchis maculata, Nicotiana tabacum, etc.
  - Diploid parthenogenesis: When the megagametophyte develops without completing meiosis, so that the megagametophyte and all cells within it are meiotically unreduced (a.k.a. diploid, but diploid is an ambiguous term), this is called diploid parthenogenesis, and the plant that develops from the embryo will have the same number of chromosomes as the mother plant. Diploid parthenogenesis is a component process of gametophytic apomixis (see above).
- Androgenesis and androclinesis are synonyms. These terms are used for two different processes that both have the effect of producing an embryo that has "male inheritance".

The first process is a natural one. It may also be referred to as male apomixis or paternal apomixis. It involves fusion of the male and female gametes and replacement of the female nucleus by the male nucleus. This has been noted as a rare phenomenon in many plants (e.g. Nicotiana and Crepis), and occurs as the regular reproductive method in the Saharan Cypress, Cupressus dupreziana. Recently, the first example of natural androgenesis in a vertebrate, a fish, Squalius alburnoides was discovered. It is also known in invertebrates, particularly clams in the genus Corbicula, and these asexually reproducing males are noted to have a wider range than their noninvasive non-hermaphroditic cousins, more similar to hermaphroditic invasive species in the genus, indicating that this does sometimes have evolutionary benefits.
The second process that is referred to as androgenesis or androclinesis involves (artificial) culture of haploid plants from anther tissue or microspores. Androgenesis has also been artificially induced in fish.

- Apogamy: In modern usage, apogamy refers primarily to the development of a sporophyte directly from somatic cells of the gametophyte without fertilization, a process most commonly described in ferns and other plants with independent gametophyte generations. Historically, the term was also applied more broadly to asexual embryo formation in flowering plants, including development from cells of the embryo sac other than the egg cell (such as synergids or antipodal cells), but this usage is now uncommon and has largely been replaced by more precise terminology within apomixis classifications.
- Addition hybrids, called B_{III} hybrids by Rutishauser: An embryo is formed after a meiotically unreduced egg cell is fertilized. The ploidy level of the embryo is therefore higher than that of the mother plant. This process occurs in some plants that are otherwise apomictic, and may play a significant role in producing tetraploid plants from triploid apomictic mother plants (if they receive pollen from diploids). Because fertilization is involved, this process does not fit the definition of apomixis.
- Pseudogamy refers to any reproductive process that requires pollination but does not involve male inheritance. It is sometimes used in a restrictive sense to refer to types of apomixis in which the endosperm is fertilized but the embryo is not. A better term for the restrictive sense is centrogamy.
- Agamospecies, the concept introduced by Göte Turesson: "an apomict population the constituents of which, for morphological, cytological or other reasons, are to be considered as having a common origin," i.e., basically synonymous with "microspecies.

== See also ==
- Cytomixis – Migration of the nucleus from one plant cell to another, a process of nuclear fusion that occurs during pollen meiosis
- Klepton – Aspect of reproductive biology, a phenomenon known in zoology where mating with another taxon is required to complete reproduction
- Meiosis – Cell division producing haploid gametes
- Parthenocarpy – Production of seedless fruit without fertilisation, the production of seedless fruits
- Parthenogenesis – Asexual reproduction without fertilization, the animal equivalent of apomixis
- Plant reproductive morphology – Parts of plant enabling sexual reproduction
