= DeLand House Museum =

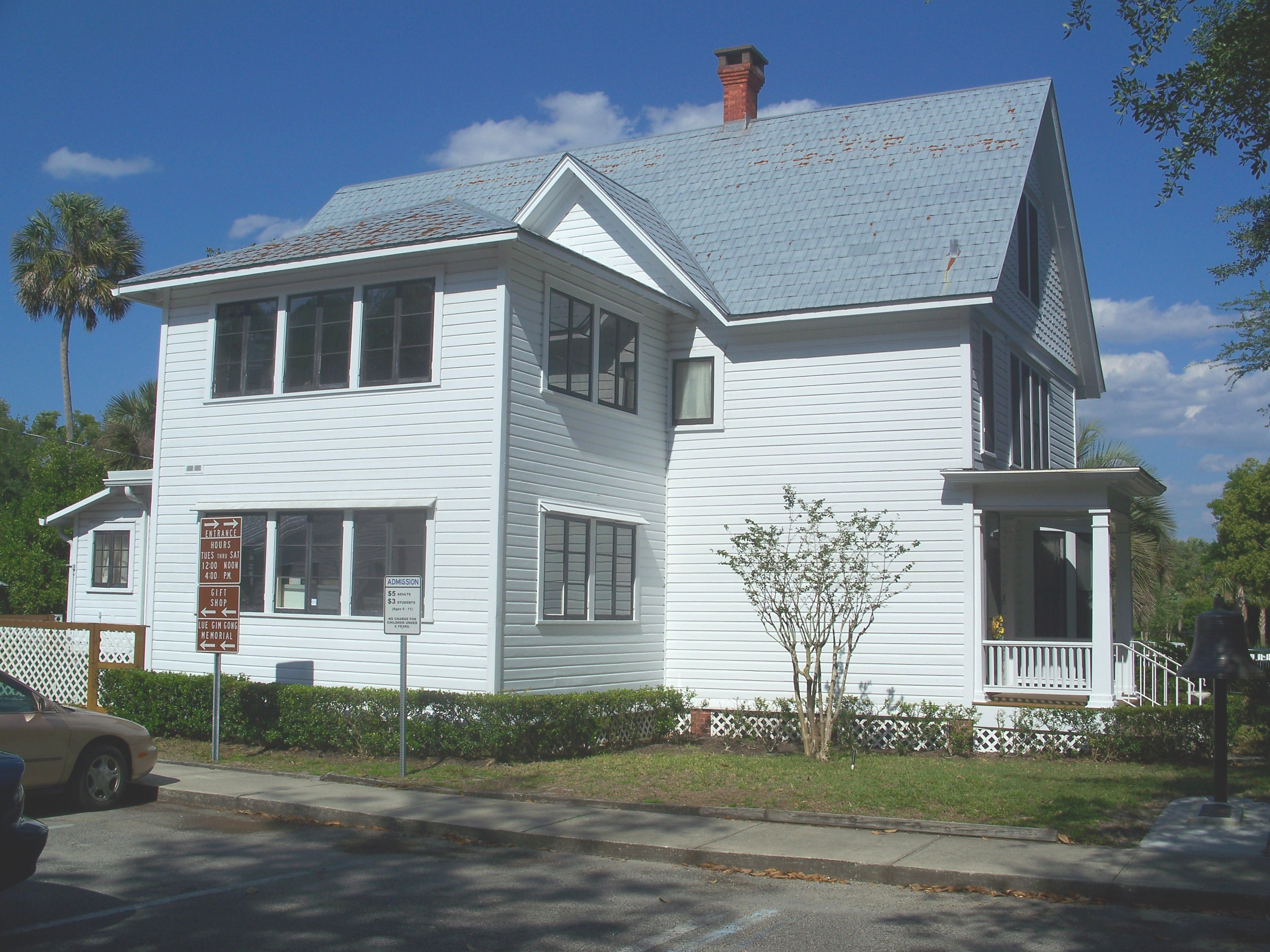

- Location within Volusia County
- Established: 1990
- Location: 137 West Michigan Avenue; DeLand, Florida
- Coordinates: 29.03369°N 81.30505°W
- Type: History museum
- Website: DeLand House Museum

The DeLand House Museum is located at 137 West Michigan Avenue, DeLand, Florida. Built in 1886 by Henry Addison DeLand, it changed hands numerous times until it was donated to the city of DeLand in 1988. It opened as a Victorian era historic house museum in 1990. The museum also contains materials related to the history of western Volusia County, and is operated by the West Volusia Historical Society.

== See also ==
- Conrad Center, a museum operated by the West Volusia Historical Society
- Lue Gim Gong Memorial Garden, a garden operated by the West Volusia Historical Society
