= Midknight Valencia Orange =

Variety of fruit

Midknight valencia orange
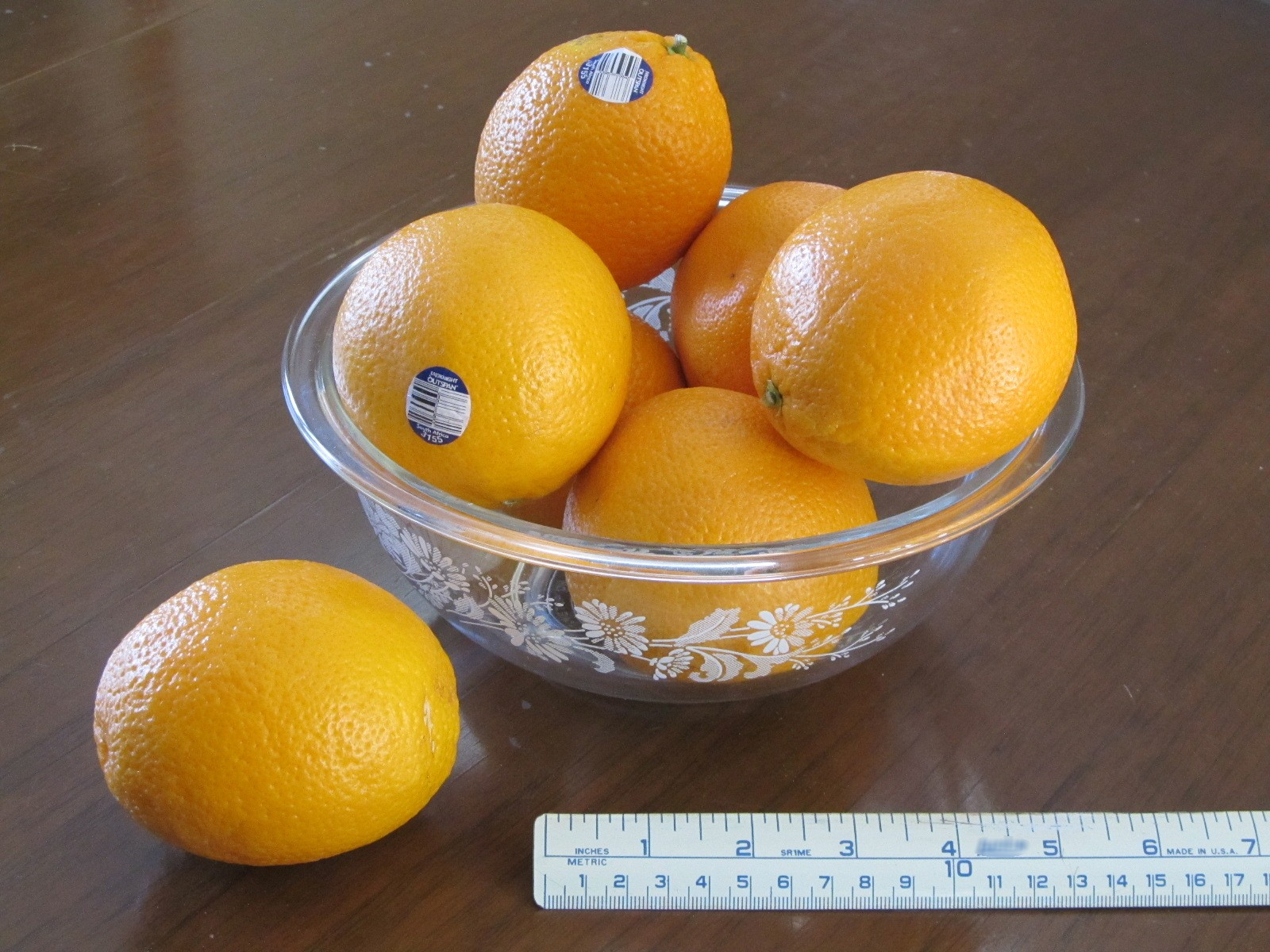
- Midknight oranges, which are typically oblong in shape
- Species: Citrus × sinensis
- Cultivar: 'Valencia'
- Origin: ddo, Eastern Cape province South Africa

The Midknight Valencia orange is a South African variety of the Valencia orange. Its exact origin is unknown, however, around 1927, this variety was first noticed, growing among Valencia orange trees in an orchard at Addo, Eastern Cape, South Africa by A.P. Knight whom the orange was later named after. In following years, more observations were made documenting characteristics of the orange and coming to the conclusion that it should be considered a variety of the Valencia orange.

Among their numerous health benefits, according to Kenny MacLeod of the Jupiter Group, consumption of midknight valencia oranges can provide as much as 116 percent of daily recommended vitamin C intake.

== Description ==
The 'Midknight' Valencia orange is a South African variety of the standard Valencia orange. There are both positive and negative differences between 'Midknight' Valencia, and standard Valencia oranges and their respective trees. 'Midknight' trees are slower growing, and more susceptible to copper deficiency and frost than standard Valencia trees, but grow larger, juicier fruit with virtually no seeds; the Valencia orange is easier to peel and produces larger yields. Other characteristics of the 'Midknight' Valencia orange include its somewhat oblong shape, good juicing quality, earlier ripening than other Valencias, and its large, broad leaves.

== Trade of 'Midknight' oranges ==
South Africa is a very large citrus exporter, accounting for 60% of the Southern Hemisphere's citrus. Nearly all of 'Midknight' Valencia oranges shipped to the United States from South Africa are provided through The Western Cape Citrus Producers Forum, WCCPF, an association of roughly 350 independent, expert-approved summer citrus growers in South Africa. The organization has been shipping South African summer citrus to The United States since 1999. Shipments have grown substantially from just 50 tons to ~40,000 tons that were expected as of 2011 estimates for that year's summer citrus shipments. In 2011, 600,000 cartons of 'Midknight' oranges were set to arrive in the US, 60,000 more cartons than were shipped in 2010. Even the original shipments in 2011 proved not to be enough; 'Midknight' Valencia oranges were in such high demand in the US that a vessel had to be discharged during a weekend to get oranges on grocery shelves as soon as possible. 'Midknight' Valencia oranges have proved to be a staple of South African summer citrus even with their short season (August–October) that brings the citrus season to a close.
