= Smith Red Valencia =

Edible fruit cultivar

- Species: Citrus × sinensis
- Hybrid parentage: pummelo × mandarin orange
- Cultivar: 'Smith Red Valencia'
- Origin: Ventura County, California, United States

Smith Red Valencia is a pigmented bud sport of a conventional Valencia orange tree.

An initial scientific report stated:

The rind frequently carries a heavy red blush and the flesh is heavily pigmented by anthocyanin. The fruit shape is somewhat variable at present, globose to ovoid with a depressed base, possibly due to the juvenility of the subject trees. Although the fruit is mature in late winter, it holds well into late spring, well past the season for conventional blood oranges.

Although red inside, the Smith Red is a Valencia and not a blood orange. Researchers were made aware of it in 1988 when a woman named Merleen Smith in Ventura County, California contacted a local farm advisor on the suspicion that her neighbor was poisoning her tree; the cultivar now bears her name.
