= Iris Chang =

American writer and activist (1968–2004)

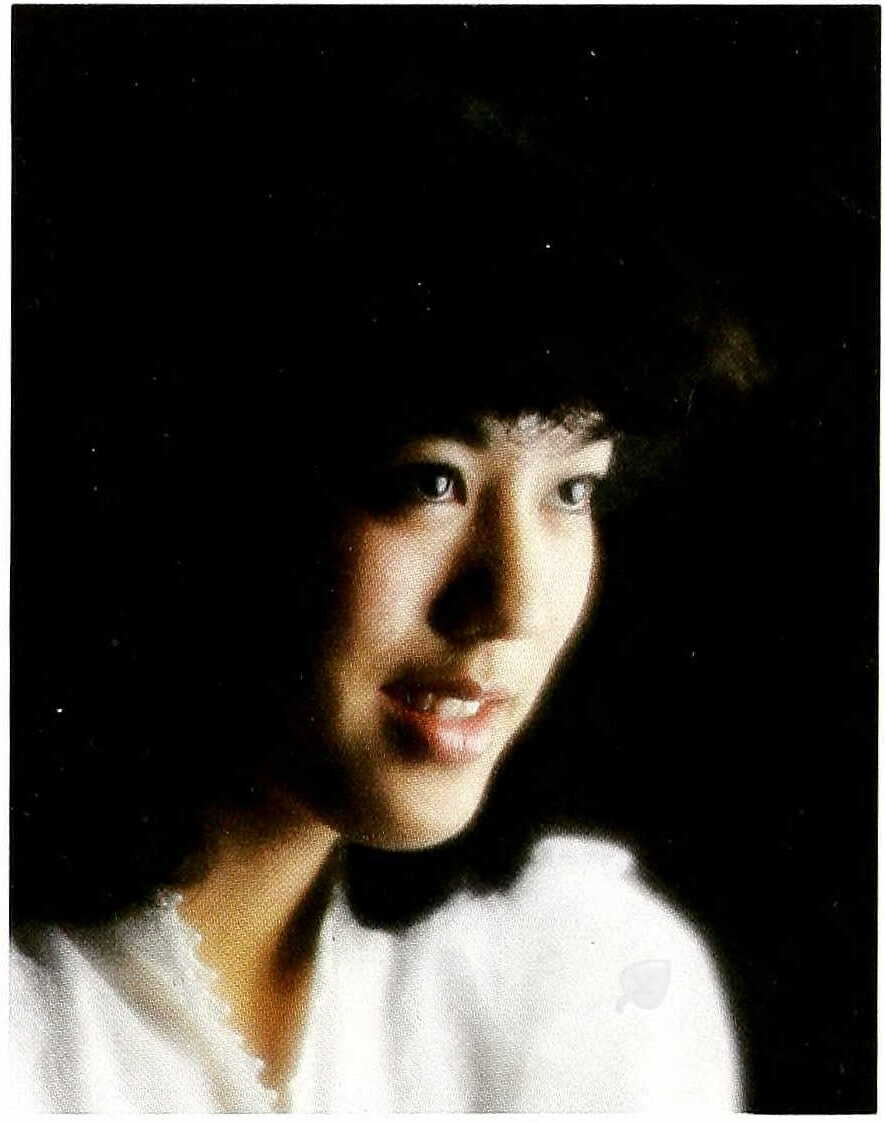
- Chang, c. 1985
- Born: Iris Shun-Ru Chang; March 28, 1968; Princeton, New Jersey, U.S.
- Died: November 9, 2004 (aged 36); Santa Clara County, California, U.S.
- Education: University of Illinois at Urbana-Champaign (BA); Johns Hopkins University (MA)
- Occupations: Author; journalist; human rights activist
- Spouse: Bretton Douglas (m. 1991)
- Children: 1
- Writing career
- Period: 1995–2004
- Subjects: Chinese Americans, Nanjing Massacre, Qian Xuesen
- Website: www.irischang.net Iris Chang's voice Chang discusses her motivation for writing The Rape of Nanking in an interview on 20 January 1998.

Iris Chang
- Traditional Chinese: 張純如
- Simplified Chinese: 张纯如
Transcriptions
Standard Mandarin
- Hanyu Pinyin: Zhāng Chúnrú
- Wade–Giles: Chang1 Ch'un2-ju2

Iris Shun-Ru Chang (traditional Chinese: 張純如; March 28, 1968 – November 9, 2004) was an American journalist, historian, and political activist. She is best known for her best-selling 1997 account of the Nanjing Massacre, The Rape of Nanking, and in 2003, The Chinese in America: A Narrative History. Chang is the subject of the 2007 biography Finding Iris Chang, and the 2007 documentary film Iris Chang: The Rape of Nanking starring Olivia Cheng as Iris Chang. The independent 2007 documentary film Nanking was based on her work and dedicated to her memory.

== Biography ==
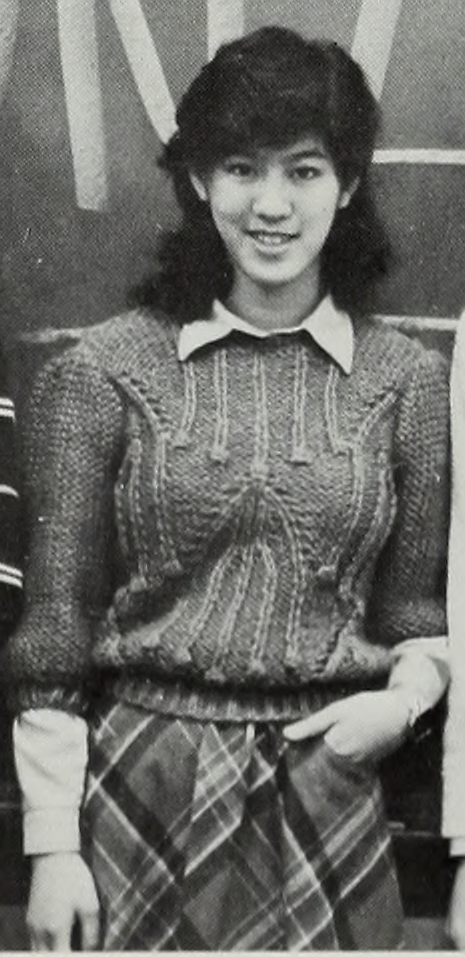
Chang in 1985

Iris Chang was born in Princeton, New Jersey, to a Taiwanese American family, as the daughter of university professors Ying-Ying Chang, (Chinese: 張盈盈; born 1940) and Shau-Jin Chang (Chinese: 張紹進; January 7, 1937 – January 25, 2025). Ying-Ying was born in Chongqing to parents originally from Guiyang, while Shau-Jin was born in Suqian. Both spent their early childhood in Chongqing, the capital of China at the time, due to the Second Sino-Japanese War on the eastern coast, with Ying-Ying's family having fled Nanjing from the invading Imperial Japanese Army three years before her birth. Chang's parents separately emigrated to Taiwan in 1949 and 1951 respectively, moving to the United States in 1962 after receiving scholarships at Harvard University.

Chang's English name was chosen to invoke both the Greek rainbow goddess Iris as well as the iris of the eye, while her Chinese name meant "something pure and innocent". She was born two weeks overdue and lived the first months of her life in housing provided by Princeton Hospital. In late 1969, after briefly living in Boulder, Colorado, for a physics workshop, the family relocated to Champaign–Urbana, Illinois, where her father had accepted a teaching position at the University of Illinois. Chang grew up hearing stories about the Nanjing massacre, from which her maternal grandparents escaped. When she tried finding books about the subject in the Champaign Public Library, she found there were none.

Chang attended the University Laboratory High School of Urbana, Illinois, and graduated in 1985. She was initially a computer science major, but switched to journalism, earning a bachelor's degree at the University of Illinois at Urbana-Champaign in 1989. During her time in college she also worked as a New York Times stringer from Urbana-Champaign, and wrote six front-page articles over the course of one year. After brief stints at the Associated Press and the Chicago Tribune, she pursued a master's degree in Writing Seminars at Johns Hopkins University.

In 1991, Chang married Bretton Lee Douglas, a design engineer for Cisco Systems, whom she had met in college, and had one son, Christopher, who was two years old at the time of her suicide. She lived in San Jose, California, in the final years of her life.

== Literary career ==
Chang wrote three books documenting the experiences of Chinese and Chinese Americans in history. Her first, Thread of the Silkworm (Basic Books, 1995) tells the life story of the Chinese professor, Qian Xuesen (or Tsien Hsue-shen) during the Red Scare in the 1950s. Although Qian was one of the founders of NASA's Jet Propulsion Laboratory (JPL), and for many years helped the military of the United States debrief scientists from Nazi Germany, he was suddenly accused of being a spy and a member of the Communist Party USA, and was placed under house arrest from 1950 to 1955. Qian left for the People's Republic of China in September 1955. Upon his return to China, Qian developed the Dongfeng missile program, and later the Silkworm missile, which was used by the Iraqi military during its war on Iran and against the United States-led coalitions during the Persian Gulf War and the 2003 invasion of Iraq.

External videos
- Booknotes interview with Chang on The Rape of Nanking, January 11, 1998, C-SPAN
- Presentation by Chang on The Rape of Nanking, November 22, 1998, C-SPAN
- Presentation by Chang on The Chinese in America, April 30, 2003, C-SPAN

Her second book, The Rape of Nanking: The Forgotten Holocaust of World War II (1997), was published on the 60th anniversary of the Nanjing Massacre and was motivated in part by her own grandparents' stories about their escape from the massacre. It documents atrocities committed against the Chinese by forces of the Imperial Japanese Army during the Second Sino-Japanese War, and includes interviews with victims. The Rape of Nanking remained on the New York Times Bestseller list for 10 weeks.

Her third book, The Chinese in America: A Narrative History (2003), is a history of Chinese Americans, that argues their treatment as perpetual outsiders by American society. Consistent with the style of her earlier works, the book relies heavily on personal accounts, drawing its strong emotional content from their stories. She wrote, "The America of today would not be the same America without the achievements of its ethnic Chinese," and that "scratch the surface of every American celebrity of Chinese heritage and you will find that, no matter how stellar their achievements, no matter how great their contribution to US society, virtually all of them have had their identities questioned at one point or another."

== Depression and death ==
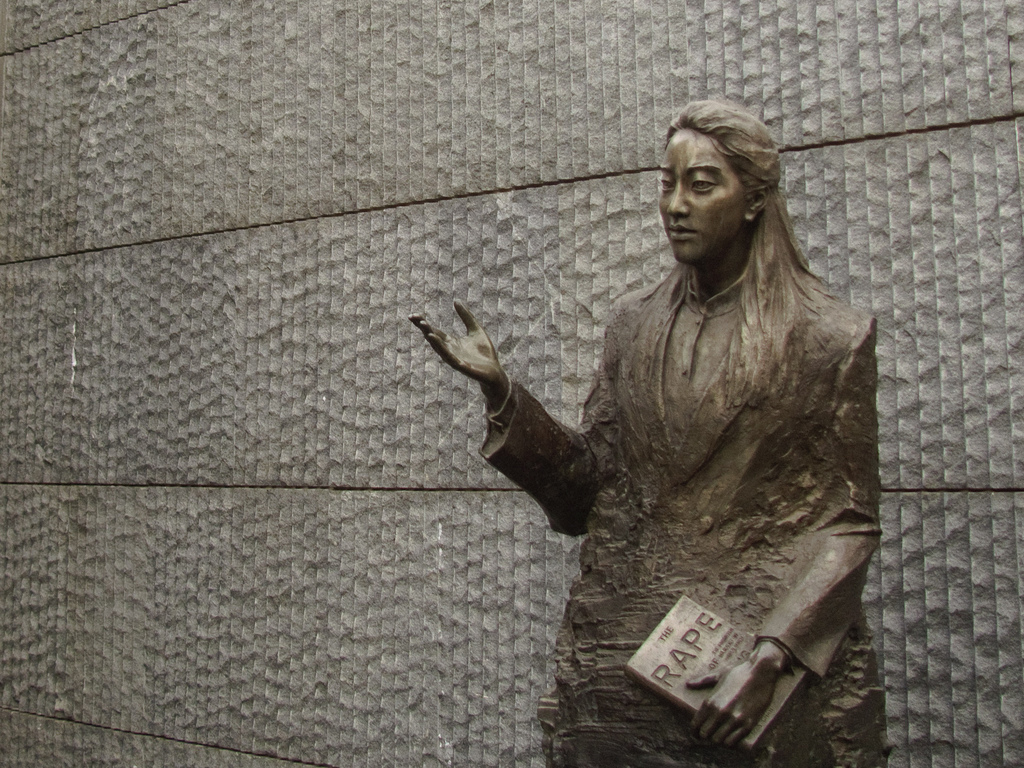
A bronze statue of Iris Chang at the Nanjing Massacre Memorial Hall in Nanjing

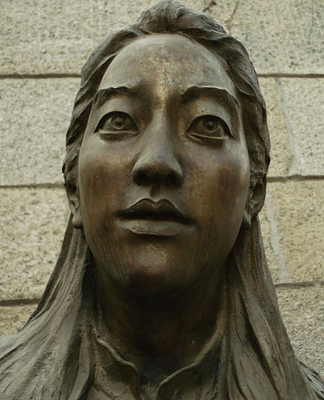
Iris Chang, closeup photo of statue

Beginning in 1999, Chang reportedly experienced periods of intense and obsessive focus on her work, mood swings, and insomnia, which some later sources characterized as symptoms of bipolar disorder. Some sources have also linked Chang's miscarriages to the onset of what they characterized as bipolar disorder. However, her mother, Ying-Ying Chang, disputed this characterization, writing that Iris had never previously experienced a serious depressive or manic episode and that neither Iris nor her parents believed that she had bipolar disorder. She stated that the diagnosis reported following Chang's 2004 hospitalization was never verified or confirmed.

Chang later described the lasting psychological impact of writing The Rape of Nanking, saying: “Sometimes I would be shopping or walking through the park, and without any warning, some image from 'The Rape of Nanking' would just float in front of me ... I didn't want the events to spill over and poison the rest of my life.”

Chang suffered a nervous breakdown in August 2004, which her family, friends, and doctors attributed in part to constant sleep deprivation, dozens of herbal supplements, and the effects of prescription medication. At the time, she was several months into research for her fourth book, about the Bataan Death March. She was also promoting The Chinese in America. While en route to Harrodsburg, Kentucky, where she planned to gain access to a "time capsule" of audio recordings from servicemen, she suffered an extreme bout of depression that left her unable to leave her hotel room in Louisville. A local veteran, Arthur Kelly, who was assisting her research, helped her check into Norton Psychiatric Hospital in Louisville, where she was diagnosed with reactive psychosis, placed on medication for three days and then released to her parents. After the release from the hospital, she continued to suffer from depression and experienced the side effects of several medications she was taking. Chang was also reportedly deeply disturbed by much of the subject matter of her research.

According to her mother, Chang's first suicide attempt occurred on September 21, 2004, and her attempt to purchase a firearm occurred on October 28. Her mother wrote that both incidents were completely out of character for Chang and occurred several days after she had begun taking the antidepressant citalopram. Her mother also stated that Chang had initially been strongly opposed to taking prescribed medication. According to her account, psychiatrist Martin Teicher explained that his usual starting dose of risperidone was 0.25 mg, while Chang's initial prescription was eight times that amount.

On November 9, 2004, at 9:15 A.M., Chang was found dead in the driver's seat of her Oldsmobile Alero car by a Santa Clara Valley Water District employee on a rural road south of Los Gatos, California and west of State Route 17, in Santa Clara County. Investigators concluded that Chang had committed suicide by shooting herself through the mouth with a .45 Ruger Old Army revolver. At the time of her death, she had been taking the medications valproate and risperidone to stabilize her mood.

It was later discovered that she had left behind three suicide notes each dated November 8, 2004. "Statement of Iris Chang" stated:

I promise to get up and get out of the house every morning. I will stop by to visit my parents then go for a long walk. I will follow the doctor's orders for medications. I promise not to hurt myself. I promise not to visit Web sites that talk about suicide.

The next note was a draft of the third:

When you believe you have a future, you think in terms of generations and years. When you do not, you live not just by the day — but by the minute. It is far better that you remember me as I was—in my heyday as a best-selling author—than the wild-eyed wreck who returned from Louisville. ... Each breath is becoming difficult for me to take—the anxiety can be compared to drowning in an open sea. I know that my actions will transfer some of this pain to others, indeed those who love me the most. Please forgive me.

The third note included:

There are aspects of my experience in Louisville that I will never understand. Deep down I suspect that you may have more answers about this than I do. I can never shake my belief that I was being recruited, and later persecuted, by forces more powerful than I could have imagined. Whether it was the CIA or some other organization I will never know. As long as I am alive, these forces will never stop hounding me.

Days before I left for Louisville I had a deep foreboding about my safety. I sensed suddenly threats to my own life: an eerie feeling that I was being followed in the streets, the white van parked outside my house, damaged mail arriving at my P.O. Box. I believe my detention at Norton Hospital was the government's attempt to discredit me.

A report from the San Francisco Chronicle stated that news of her suicide had a strong impact on survivors of the Nanjing Massacre and the Chinese community in general.

== Legacy ==
The Rape of Nanking placed her in great demand as a speaker, interview subject, and spokesperson for the viewpoint that the Japanese government had not done enough to compensate victims of their invasion of China. In one incident reported by The Times of London, she confronted the Japanese ambassador to the United States on television, demanded an apology and expressed her dissatisfaction with his answer that it was really unfortunate that acts of violence were committed by members of the Japanese military. "It is because of these types of wording and the vagueness of such expressions that Chinese people, I think, are infuriated," she responded.

After her death, she became the subject of tributes from fellow writers. Mo Hayder dedicated a novel to her. Reporter Richard Rongstad eulogized her as "Iris Chang lit a flame and passed it to others and we should not allow that flame to be extinguished." In 2007, the documentary Nanking was dedicated to Chang, as well as the Chinese victims of Nanjing.

"The Man Who Ended History", a story in The Paper Managerie by Ken Liu about uncovering the history of Unit 731, is dedicated to the memory of Chang.

R.F. Kuang's debut novel, The Poppy War, is dedicated to Iris Chang.

== Memorials ==
In 2017, the Iris Chang Memorial Hall was built in Huai'an, China.

On November 9, 2019, Iris Chang Park was inaugurated in the Rincon district of San Jose.

== Published works ==
- Chang, Iris (1996). Thread of the Silkworm. Basic Books. p. 352. ISBN 978-0-465-00678-6.
- ——— (1997). The Rape of Nanking: The Forgotten Holocaust of World War II. Basic Books. p. 290. ISBN 978-0-465-06835-7.
- ——— (2003). The Chinese in America. A Narrative History. Penguin. p. 448. ISBN 0-14-200417-0.

== See also ==
- Global Alliance for Preserving the History of WWII in Asia
- John Rabe
- Nanking (1937–1945)
