= Thread of the Silkworm =

1996 nonfiction book by Iris Chang

- Author: Iris Chang
- Language: English
- Genre: History, nonfiction
- Published: 1996
- Publisher: Basic Books
- Publication place: USA
- Pages: 352
- ISBN: 9780465006786
- Dewey Decimal: 629.1092
- LC Class: TL781.85.T836 C49 1995

Thread of the Silkworm is a 1996 historical nonfiction book by Iris Chang. It tells the story of Tsien Hsue-Shen, a leading aerodynamist who worked with Theodore von Karman and is associated with the Jet Propulsion Lab, was deported amidst the Red Scare, and subsequently became a chief progenitor of the Chinese space program.

== Background ==
The book tells a story of Tsien Hsue-Shen, a Chinese scientist who left China in 1935 and studied under Theodor von Karman in Caltech, was one of the founders of the Jet Propulsion Lab, and became one of the leading aerodynamists in the United States. Despite this, in 1950 he was suspected as a communist and was deported in 1955 during the Red Scare; afterwards, he joined the Chinese Communist Party, writing an article that "scientifically supported" Mao's Great Leap Forward. He is chiefly remembered for becoming a chief designer of China's missile and satellite programs, among them the book's namesake, the Silkworm missile.

Although Chang was unable to interview Tsien because he refused to talk to Americans, she interviewed his son.

Chang wrote of Tsien:

How stark the contrast between the young Tsien and the old. The young Tsien dreamed of a world of peace and equality. The older Tsien lived in a world governed by regimented hierarchy and helped manufacture the weapons of world destruction. The young Tsien was both Chinese and American, at heart a citizen of two countries. The older Tsien felt alienated by both.

== Reception ==
Heidi Benson of the San Francisco Chronicle stated that "It was well-reviewed, though it never sold in great numbers."

Eliot A. Cohen noted that the book "reveals the price a scientist may pay for vanity when immersed in a political world he understands less than he thinks".

Tianyu Fang of the Foreign Policy called the book "perhaps the most comprehensive account of Tsien's life".
