= Anthony Day =

American journalist (1933–2007)

Anthony Day (May 12, 1933 – September 2, 2007) was an American journalist, former editorial page editor for the Los Angeles Times, and editor of Henry Kissinger's work for over 25 years.

== Early life ==
Anthony Day was born in Miami, Florida, on May 12, 1933. His father, Price Day, worked as a foreign correspondent for The Baltimore Sun, earning a Pulitzer Prize in 1949, and was later editor-in-chief of the newspaper. Anthony Day had three younger brothers, all of whom also became journalists.

Day graduated from Harvard University in 1955. He served two years in the U.S. Army following graduation.

== Career ==
Day's career in journalism began at the Philadelphia Bulletin. He began working at the paper in 1957. He was eventually promoted to the paper's Washington, D.C. bureau chief.

Day was hired by the Los Angeles Times as the chief editorial writer in 1969. He eventually rose to become the editorial page editor, a position he held from 1971 until 1989, when he relinquished his editorial responsibilities but continued with the Times as a correspondent until he retired in the mid-1990s. Day continued to work part-time for the Times as a contributor to the book review section after his official retirement. He also continued to edit a regular column by former U.S. Secretary of State Henry Kissinger.

On the day after Day's death, Kissinger said of him, "Although he was a constant critic of the policies of the administrations in which I served, I always considered him a critic of exemplary fairness, ability and honesty."

== Death ==
Day died of emphysema on September 2, 2007, at St. Vincent Regional Medical Center in Santa Fe, New Mexico. He was survived by his wife, Lynn, and son, John.
