= Cytomixis =

Migration of the nucleus from one plant cell to another

Cytomixis is migration of the nuclei from one plant cell to another through intercellular channels of a special type (cytomictic channels), differing from plasmodesmata in their structure and size. This unique phenomenon was discovered over a century ago. Intercellular migration of nuclei has been observed in manifold types of plant tissues, for example, apical meristem cells of woody plants and vegetative tissues of the anther. However, cytomixis is most frequently detectable in microsporogenesis. Сytomixis can be involved in the evolutionary processes due to production of unreduced gametes or gametes with varying chromosome numbers. To date cytomixis was found in microsporogenesis of over 400 plant species belonging to 84 families.
