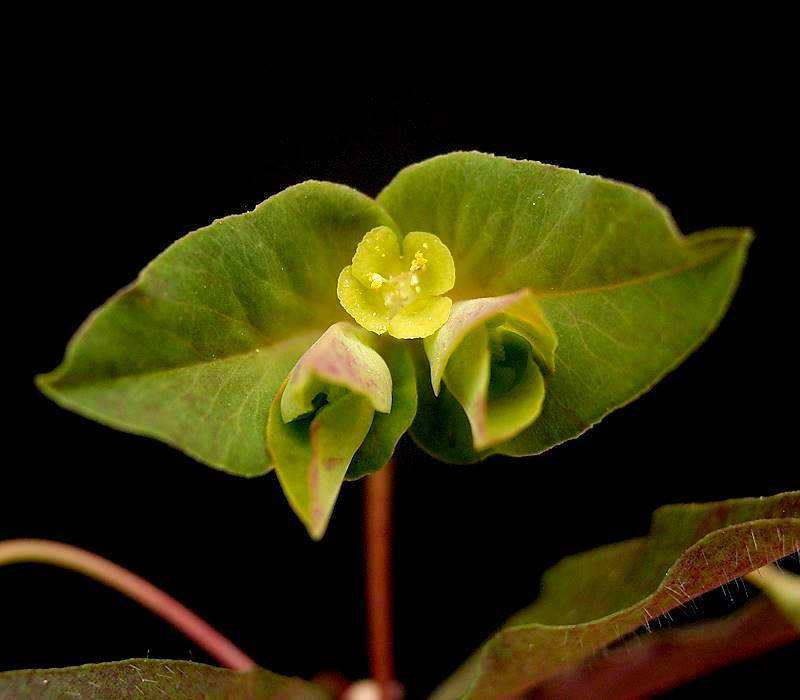

Scientific classification
- Kingdom: Plantae
- Clade: Embryophytes
- Clade: Tracheophytes
- Clade: Spermatophytes
- Clade: Angiosperms
- Clade: Eudicots
- Clade: Rosids
- Order: Malpighiales
- Family: Euphorbiaceae
- Genus: Euphorbia
- Species: E. dulcis

Binomial name
- Euphorbia dulcis L.

Synonyms
- List: Euphorbia alpigena A.Kern.; Euphorbia cordata Schrank; Euphorbia deseglisei Boreau ex Boiss.; Euphorbia dulcis f. lanuginosa Oudejans; Euphorbia fallax Hagenb.; Euphorbia hiberna Lepech.; Euphorbia incompta Ces.; Euphorbia lanuginosa Lam.; Euphorbia patens Kit.; Euphorbia purpurata Thuill.; Euphorbia solisequa Rchb.; Euphorbia viridiflora Waldst. & Kit.; Galarhoeus dulcis (L.) Haw.; Pythius dulcis (L.) Raf.; Tithymalus alpigena (A.Kern.) Woerl.; Tithymalus deseglisei (Boreau ex Boiss.) Soják; Tithymalus dulcis (L.) Scop.; Tithymalus dulcis subsp. ellipticus (Pers.) Soják; Tithymalus dulcis subsp. incomptus (Ces.) Soják; Tithymalus dulcis subsp. purpuratus (Thuill.) Holub

= Euphorbia dulcis =

Species of flowering plant

Euphorbia dulcis, sweet spurge, is a species in the genus Euphorbia, native to Europe. It is not as acrid as other Euphorbia species, hence the epithet which means "sweet". The cultivar 'Chameleon', with purple foliage, is the one most commonly planted in gardens.
