= 1867 Chinese Labor Strike =

Railroad workers action in California

- Date: June 24, 1867 - July 1, 1867
- Location: Transcontinental Railroad between Cisco and Truckee
- Methods: Strike
- Result: Workers forced to end strike; minor concessions in aftermath

Parties
Chinese Railroad Workers	Central Pacific Railroad

Lead figures
Unknown	Charles Crocker; James Strobridge

Number
Workers: 3,000	

The 1867 Chinese Labor Strike was a strike by Chinese Transcontinental Railroad workers along the Sierra Nevada mountain range, demanding increased pay, shorter workdays, and better conditions. By 1867, 80-90% of the Central Pacific Railroad workforce was Chinese, so their work stoppage posed a critical threat to the company's efforts. The strike was highly organized and nonviolent, but fizzled out after just over a week, as the strikers faced a supply blockade and escalating threats by Central Pacific. Although the Chinese did not obtain any immediate concessions from their employer, the company was forced to quietly raise wages for experienced workers and slightly improved their conditions.

== Background ==
Although Central Pacific broke ground on its portion of the Transcontinental Railroad at the start of 1863, progress was glacial and severely hampered by a shortage of labor. The company's recruitment efforts only yielded a few hundred white men, many of whom were unreliable and would leave as soon as they heard of other opportunities. This was not sufficient given the enormous challenge of building a railroad across the Sierra Nevada, and Central Pacific began looking for alternative sources of labor. Though initially resistant to the idea of hiring Chinese, experiments with hiring small numbers of them proved highly successful, and the company soon began to employ ever larger numbers of Chinese workers.

Teams of Chinese were working on the railroad as early as January 1864, with more hired throughout the year. Given their limited population in California, Central Pacific decided to directly recruit laborers from China via contractors; the Chinese workforce swelled to 4,000 by July 1865 and over 11,000 by February 1867, representing 90% of the company's total.

Despite Central Pacific's reliance on the Chinese, they generally occupied a lower rung within the railroad's hierarchy. Though some were skilled, the vast majority worked as manual laborers. Their camps were segregated, with the Chinese occupying the more exposed sections whenever sharing a site with whites; meanwhile, many white employees were quartered in a "camp train" with considerable facilities. The Chinese received less pay for longer hours, and had to buy their own provisions while whites had theirs provided. On average, the net compensation that a Chinese worker received was between one-half to two-thirds that of a white worker.

== Strike ==
On June 19, a Wednesday, an accident during tunnel construction near Cisco resulted in an enormous explosion that killed six men, leaving their bodies "blown up" and "horribly mangled," with the blast being heard for miles and almost certainly by many of the Chinese. This gruesome display of their dangerous conditions may have pushed the Railroad Chinese to action, but other factors also motivated their timing. The summer solstice had just occurred, presenting an auspicious moment for struggle; additionally, the Chinese had the most leverage they could get, with any influx of fresh workers yet to arrive and Central Pacific desperate to progress before its finances collapsed. Flyers may have been circulating within days, with Saturday and Sunday likely being spent communicating and organizing.

The strike began on Monday, June 24th, as three thousand Chinese railroad workers along a 30-mile stretch of track between Cisco and Truckee stopped working. Their primary demands were an increase in wages to $40 per month, reduction in hours from eleven to ten per day, and shortening of their dangerous tunnel shifts. Some reports also suggested that the strikers protested corporal punishment and violent coercion. The Chinese presented a united front at the start of the strike, with no apparent division that could be exploited by the company, and were nonviolent but confident.

Central Pacific quickly learned of the strike, and took a hardline stance. They would concede nothing and attempt to suppress the labor action. Believing that giving in to the Chinese would only provoke increased demands, and with no clear picture of the workers' organization or thought process, the railroad assumed that it was fighting for control of its labor force as a whole. The idea of importing thousands of freedmen was even floated, as they could serve as strikebreakers against the Chinese. The freed slaves were not forthcoming, and company executives initially reinforced their isolation from events on the ground in an attempt to hide their anxiety from the strikers.

The Chinese were quickly cut off from supplies, with Central Pacific leaders retroactively taking credit; however, internal reports also suggested that the Chinese labor contractors may have been responsible for the blockade. After a week, the prospect of starvation loomed over the strikers. The company heads, having regained their nerve, confronted the Chinese and re-emphasized that Central Pacific's conditions were non-negotiable, adding that anyone who persisted would see their month's pay docked. Divisions began to appear among the strikers, with some attempting to negotiate, others wanting to stand firm, and others still willing to give in. Central Pacific promised to intervene on the side of those returning to work, with armed guards who would prevent the Chinese from enforcing the strike. Ultimately, the Chinese ended their strike, likely believing that they had at least gained "face" through their actions.

== Aftermath ==
The Chinese returned to work without further incident, much to Central Pacific's satisfaction. The railroad would later present itself as tough and in control to shore up its public image, though in reality it was deeply shaken and confused by the strike. No written records on the Chinese side of the strike were preserved, despite the workers being literate; Central Pacific never identified any of the strike's leaders. Though the railroad did not publicly give anything to the Chinese, it quietly raised wages for experienced workers, who were now paid more than $35 per month. They suffered under slightly less abusive conditions, with many of the strikers' demands eventually being granted to a limited degree.

Central Pacific found some success in its continued recruitment efforts in China, although difficulties with finding enough men remained. The company was able to run trains across the Sierra Nevada within a year and, continuing to rely on a mostly Chinese workforce, Central Pacific eventually connected with Union Pacific's portion of the Transcontinental Railroad on May 9, 1869. Chinese railroad workers did not conduct any other major labor actions during the construction of the Transcontinental Railroad, and would gain a reputation as highly capable and disciplined workers. They were not entirely pliable, though, occasionally striking on later railroad projects in response to wage theft.

Although the Chinese would enjoy a brief period of acceptance within society thanks to their contributions on railroads, rising anti-Chinese sentiment often portrayed them as a threat to white labor and would soon result in their violent eviction from large portions of the American West.

== Other sources ==
- Chang, Gordon H. Ghosts of Gold Mountain: The Epic Story of the Chinese Who Built the Transcontinental Railroad. Boston: Houghton Mifflin Harcourt, 2019.
