= Nucellar embryony =

Form of seed reproduction

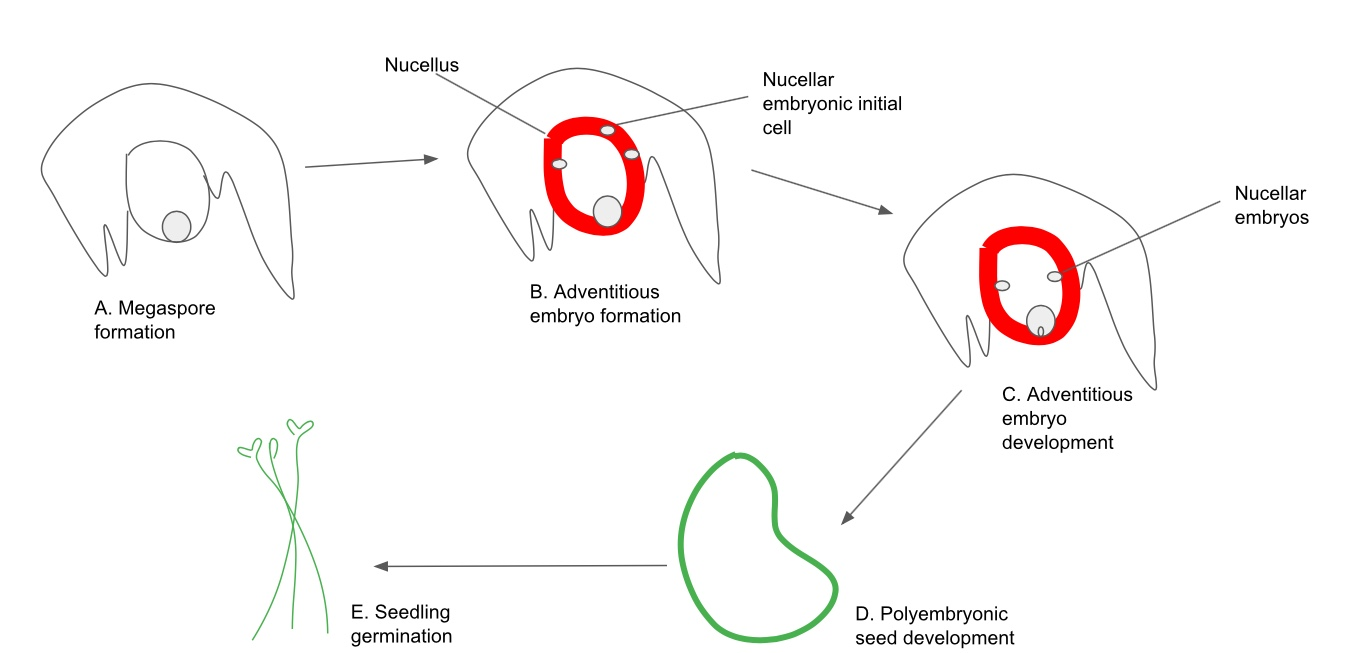
Figure 1. depicts the process of nucellar embryony. A) begins with megaspore formation. B) shows the nucellus and forming of cells, nucellar embryonic initial cells, from the nucellus tissue. These initial cells form, divide, and expand. C) The nucellar embryos are developed. If and when a zygote is present, the nucellar embryos supersede the zygote. D) The presence of extra embryos formed from the nucellar tissue gives rise to polyembryonic seeds. E) Polyembryonic seeds germinate and develop.

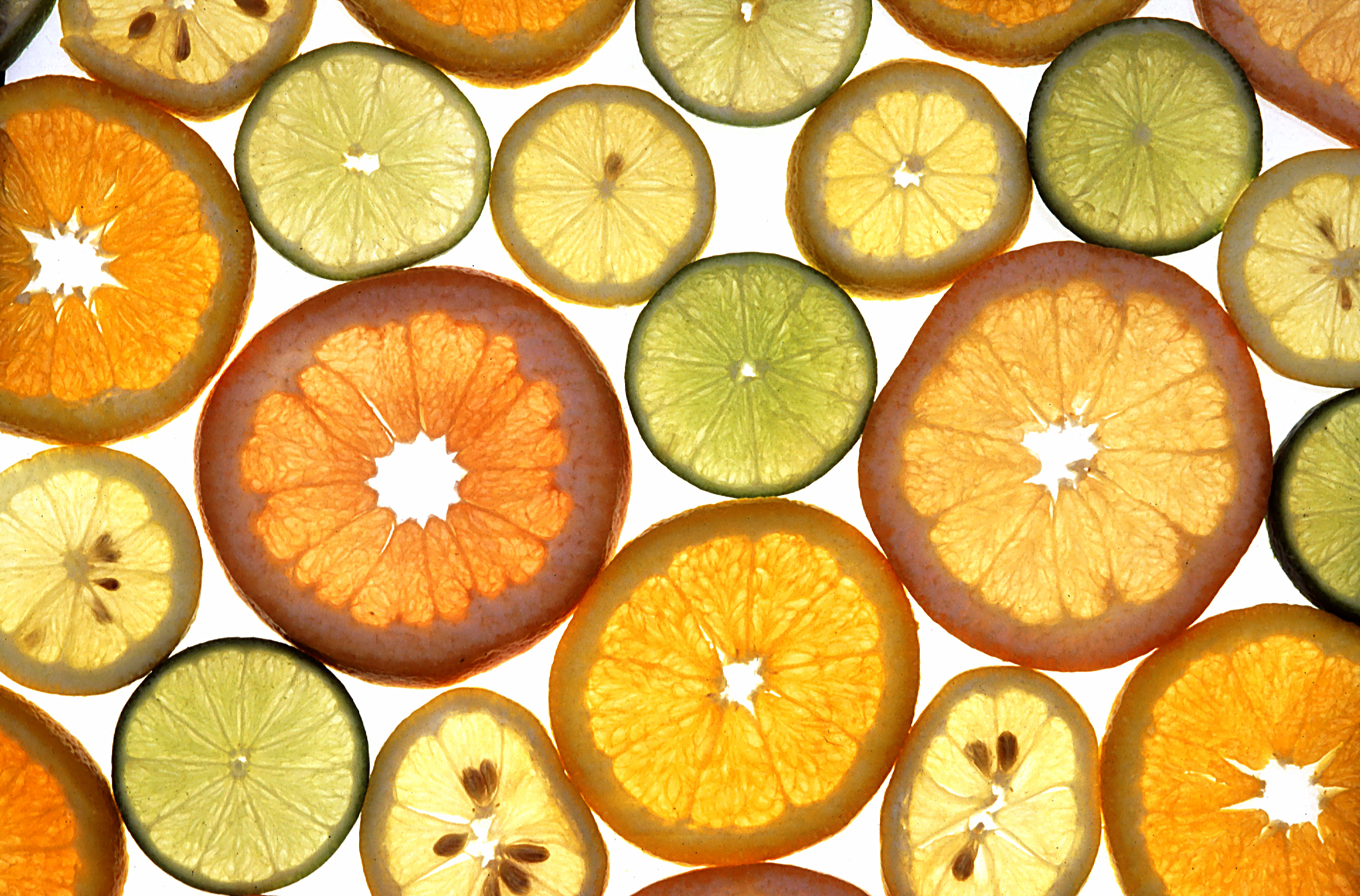
Most commercial citrus varieties produce mainly nucellar seedlings.

Nucellar embryony (notated Nu+) is a form of seed reproduction that occurs in certain plant species, including many citrus varieties. Nucellar embryony is a type of apomixis, where eventually nucellar embryos from the nucellus tissue of the ovule are formed, independent of meiosis and sexual reproduction. During the development of seeds in plants that possess this genetic trait, the nucellus tissue which surrounds the megagametophyte can produce nucellar cells, also termed initial cells. These additional embryos (polyembryony) are genetically identical to the parent plant, rendering them as clones. By contrast, zygotic seedlings are sexually produced and inherit genetic material from both parents. Most angiosperms reproduce sexually through double fertilization. Different from nucellar embryony, double fertilization occurs via the syngamy of sperm and egg cells, producing a triploid endosperm and a diploid zygotic embryo. In nucellar embryony, embryos are formed asexually from the nucellus tissue. Zygotic and nucellar embryos can occur in the same seed (monoembryony), and a zygotic embryo can divide to produce multiple embryos. The nucellar embryonic initial cells form, divide, and expand. Once the zygotic embryo becomes dominant, the initial cells stop dividing and expanding. Following this stage, the zygotic embryo continues to develop and the initial cells continue to develop as well, forming nucellar embryos. The nucellar embryos generally end up outcompeting the zygotic embryo, rending the zygotic embryo dormant. The polyembryonic seed is then formed by the many adventitious embryos within the ovule (to picture this process, refer to Figure 1). The nucellar embryos produced via apomixis inherit its mother's genetics, making them desirable for citrus propagation, research, and breeding.

== Nucellar embryony outside of citrus varieties ==
Nucellar embryos have also been found in polyembryonic Mango varieties, where generally one of the embryos is zygotic and the rest are nucellar. However, there is little research on Mangos undergoing nucellar embryo development as there has on varieties of citrus.

== Conditions ==
Nucellar embryony is able to occur within both fertilized and unfertilized ovules. Furthermore, instead of using the endosperm as nutritive tissue, it will utilize the surrounding nucellus tissue for nutrition. For example, the ‘Valencia’ orange undergoes nucellar embryony in both fertilized and unfertilized conditions. But, it has been found that nucellar embryo development, under fertilized or unfertilized conditions, can take place in different positions.

== Features ==
An important component of nucellar embryo development is its changing cell wall thickness. Between nucellar embryo's initial cell stage and its dividing and expanding stage, the cells' wall thickens. This most likely occurs due to callose deposition; callose deposition reduces the permeability of a cell and is usually found in the initial cells about to undergo embryogenesis. The initial cells become enlarged, rounded, and divided. During this stage, the initial cell's cell walls thin out, leaving room for the nucleus to become distinguished.

== Seedless fruits and influence by the citrus industry ==
Many seed plants, including citrus fruits, are self-compatible, meaning that they are able to fertilize themselves. Self-compatibility produces a seedy fruit which may be deemed undesirable to the citrus industry.

Seedless fruits have been made popular as they are sought after in the citrus industry. To be seedless, a citrus must exhibit self-incompatibility, another reproductive trait within citrus fruits and many seed plants. Self incompatibility is the phenomena where hermaphroditic plants are not able to produce fertile embryos after self-pollination. Self-incompatibility is regulated by the S-loci; if pollen is rendered incompatible, it is determined by its haploid S genotype, or if its sporophyte is rendered incompatible, it would be determined by its diploid S genotype. This is also termed and associated with parthenocarpy, the production of fruit without fertilization. Self-incompatible fruits are able to undergo parthenocarpy to yield seedless fruits. In citrus specifically, there have been other modes developed to reduce seeding as well: gibberellic acid enhances ovule abortion and copper sulfate has been shown to reduce seed number in fruit. An example is the ‘Afourer’ mandarin that contains a haploid self-incompatibility system and parthenocarpy. Under conditions where cross-pollination is not present, the ‘Afourer’ mandarin produces a seedless fruit by undergoing parthenocarpy. Where cross-pollination is present, gibberellic acid is applied and produces a decreased seeding fruit.

Nucellar embryony is important to the citrus industry, as it allows for the production of uniform rootstock which yields consistent results in fruit production. However, this trait can interfere with progress in cross-breeding; most commercial scion varieties produce mainly nucellar seedlings which do not inherit any of the traits of the "father" plant.

== See also ==
- Apomixis
