= Lue Gim Gong =

American horticulturist

Lue Gim Gong

Lue Gim Gong (Chinese: 刘锦浓; pinyin: Liú Jǐnnóng; August 24, 1857 – June 3, 1925) was a Chinese-American horticulturalist. Known as "The Citrus Wizard", he is remembered for his contribution to the orange-growing industry in Florida.

== Life ==
Born in Taishan, Guangdong, Qing dynasty China to a family of farmers, Lue Gim Gong was interested in the United States and the opportunities that lay across the Pacific Ocean. After his uncle returned from America when Lue was 15, young Lue pleaded with his parents to let him return with his uncle to America. His parents agreed, giving him a bolt of silk to sell when he arrived. He lived in a heavily Chinese-populated area in San Francisco until the age of 16 when he moved to North Adams, Massachusetts, to work at a shoe factory.

At the factory, Lue met Fannie Burlingame, who taught his Sunday School class. When she learned of his skill with plants, she asked him to live with the Burlingames, who were known to tend their garden. She converted him to Christianity and helped him become a United States citizen on October 4, 1887.

Lue had been advised to move to a warmer climate due to his recent contraction of tuberculosis. He visited China in 1886. Upon his return, Fannie recommended relocation to DeLand, Florida, where she and her sister owned land. Lue agreed, and in 1885, he was working once again, this time in orange groves.

When Ransom Eli Olds, one of the pioneers of the American automotive industry, purchased 37,500 acres of land for development at the end of 1916, he hired Lue Gim Gong, who was already 60 years old at the time, to plan for the farms. Mr. Olds was very pleased with Lue's work and named one of the roads on the farm Gim Gong Road in 1918. It is now within Oldsmar, Florida and connects to Tampa Road.

He died in DeLand on June 3, 1925.

== Legacy ==
- Lue had learned some pollination techniques from his mother in China, with which he was able to develop an apple which ripened a month earlier than other varieties, and a tomato plant that grew in clusters. In Florida, he learned to cross-pollinate citrus by watching bees. He developed a cold-tolerant grapefruit that was slower to drop, and grapefruits that grew singularly, rather than in clumps, on the branch, as well as an aromatic variety.
- Wooden Fish Songs, by Ruthanne Lum McCunn, is a historical novel based on Lue's life.
- In 1888, Lue cross-pollinated the "Harts late" Valencia and "Mediterranean Sweet" orange varieties, which produced a fruit both sweet and frost-tolerant. Originally considered a hybrid, the "Lue Gim Gong" orange was later found to be a nucellar seedling of the "Valencia" variety, which is properly called the "'Lue Gim Gong Strain". Distributed by Glen St. Mary Nurseries, the variety was awarded the Silver Wilder Medal by the American Pomological Society in 1911, the first such award for citrus fruit.
- The "Lue Gim Gong" variety is still grown in Florida as of 2006, but is sold under the general name "Valencia".
- Cigar City Brewing in Tampa Florida has dedicated a citrus-forward pale ale to his legacy, appropriately named Lue Gim Gong.
- Lue's influence was also felt in his native land China. His name appears in 'The Scientific Database of China Plant Species'. "In the 1940s, the summer-time citrus types such as "Valencia" or "Lue Gim Gong" variety was imported into China. Based on these imported varieties, several new species were developed such as the "Guixia" orange which is widely cultivated in Guangxi Province, and "Wuyuehong" orange, in Jiangjin City of Sichuan Province".
- In 2000, Lue was recognized as a “Great Floridian” by the Florida Department of State for his significant contributions to the sunshine state.
- In 1994, Gim Gong Road in Oldsmar, Florida, was renamed "Commercial Boulevard" under the pressure of a developer. Mr. Jerry Beverland was a dissenting city council member at the time of this name change. He ran and won the election and became the Mayor of Oldsmar City six years later. He tried to change the name of the road back. However, after consulting with the legal counsel and realizing that it was already part of the business agreement. He then decided to rename another road Gim Gong Road instead. April 9, 2022, several local and national Chinese American community organizations, including the Chinese Cultural Center of Florida, the Tampa Bay Chinese School, Tampa Chinese Association, New York Foundation of Chinese History in the United States, the American Chinese United Association, National Council of Chinese Americans- NCCA, and Utah Chinese Golden Spike Association presented an award plaque to Mayor Jerry Beverland, and also jointly made a donation to the local Historic Society.
- In 1995, Ruthanne Lum McCunn wrote a fictionalized account of Gim Gong's life in "Wooden Fish Songs".
- Lue Gim Gong is featured in a mural titled "Futurity," which was designed and painted by GAIA in 2021 on the North Adams Housing Authority complex in North Adams, Massachusetts. The mural was part of an effort to visualize North Adams' history in which Gim Gong played a part, becoming North Adams' "adopted son", according to Marino, a local historian.
- In May 2024, Lue’s life was featured in a Spectrum Ch. 13 news story.
