= The Asian Reporter =

Asian newspaper published in Portland, Oregon

Asian Reporter
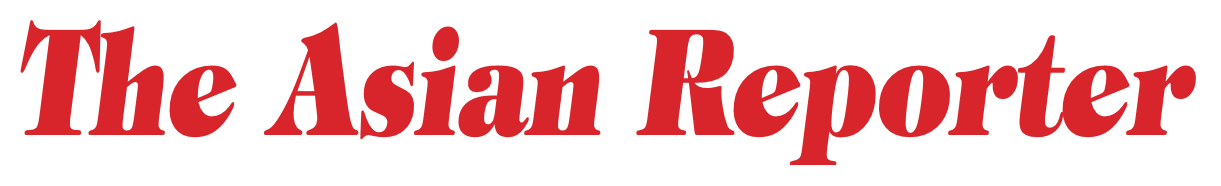

- Type: Monthly newspaper
- Publisher: Jaime Lim
- Founded: 1991; 35 years ago
- Headquarters: 922 N. Killingsworth St., Suite 2D, Portland, OR 97217
- City: Portland, Oregon
- Country: United States
- Website: asianreporter.com

The Asian Reporter is a Pacific Northwest-based newspaper, published monthly, in Portland, Oregon, United States. The paper was founded in 1991 and features international and local Northwest news and events with an Asian focus. The newspaper is published on the first Monday each month. Jaime Lim is the publisher.

== Origin ==
Jaime Lim created an in-house newsletter while serving as president of the Philippine American Chamber of Commerce of Oregon. The goal was to keep members informed of the group's activities. The newsletter grew into The Asian Reporter and had six full time staffers by 2004.

== See also ==
- Culture of Portland, Oregon
