= Embryonic sac =

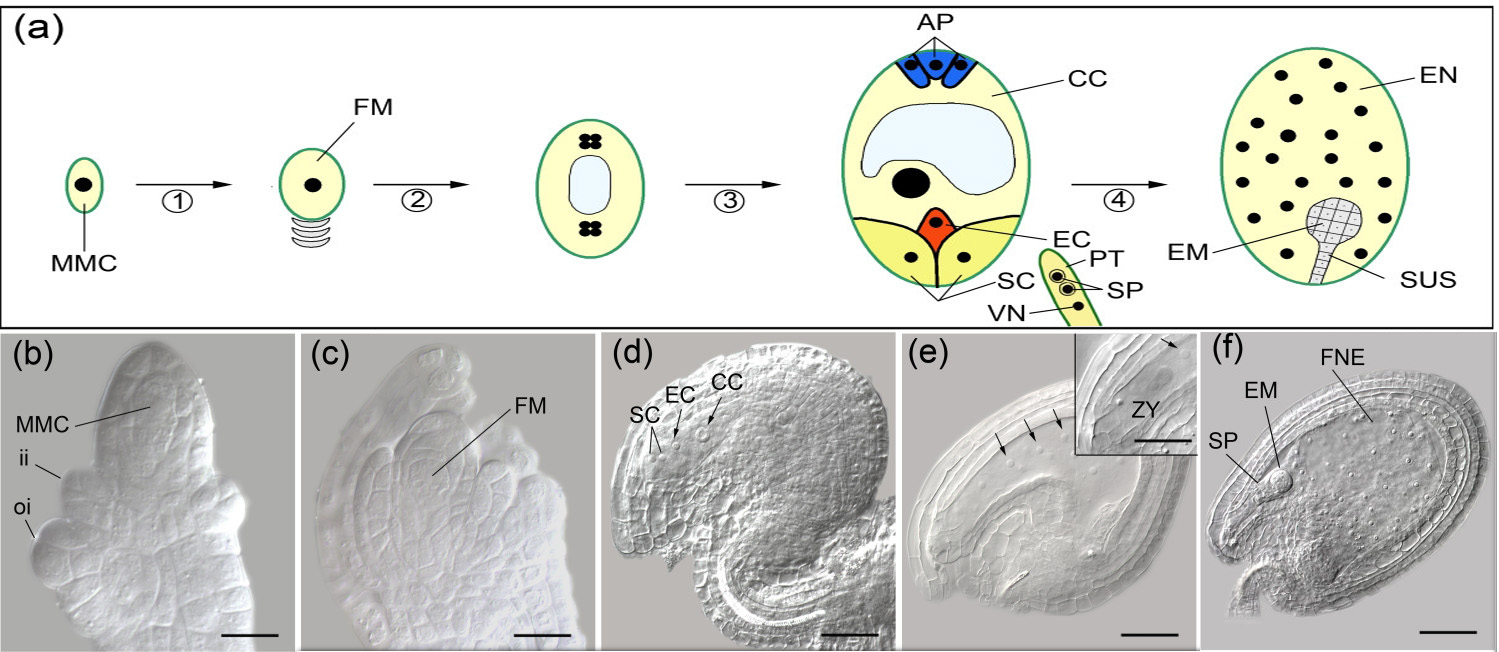
Development of the megagametophyte and fertilization in Arabidopsis thaliana. MMC - megaspore mother ; FM - functional megaspore; AP - antipodal cells; CC - central cell; EC - egg cell; SC - synergid cell; PT - pollen tube; SP - sperm; VN - vegetative nucleus; EM - embryo; EN - endosperm; SUS - suspensor

A megaspore mother cell, or megasporocyte, is a diploid cell in plants in which meiosis will occur, resulting in the production of four haploid megaspores. At least one of the spores develop into haploid female gametophytes, the megagametophytes. The megaspore mother cell arises within the megasporangium tissue.

In flowering plants the megasporangium is also called the nucellus, and the female gametophyte is sometimes called the embryo sac or embryonic sac.

== Developmental processes ==
Two distinct processes are involved in producing the megagametophyte from the megaspore mother cell:

- Megasporogenesis, formation of the megaspores in the megasporangium (nucellus) by meiosis
- Megagametogenesis; development of the megaspore(s) into the megagametophyte(s) which contains the gametes.

In gymnosperms and most flowering plants, only one of the four megaspores is functional at maturity, and the other three soon degenerate. The megaspore that remains divides mitotically and develops into the gametophyte, which eventually produces one egg cell. In the most common type of megagametophyte development in flowering plants (the Polygonum type), three mitotic divisions are involved in producing the gametophyte, which has seven cells, one of which (the central cell) has two nuclei that later merge to make a diploid nucleus.

In flowering plants, double fertilization occurs, which involves two sperm fertilizing the two gametes inside the megagametophyte (the egg cell and the central cell) to produce the embryo and the endosperm.

== Meiosis ==
In Arabidopsis, actin-related proteins regulate female meiosis by modulating the expression of meiotic genes in the megaspore mother cell. One of the key genes whose expression is regulated is Dmc1, a gene that plays a central role in the strand-exchange reactions of meiotic recombinational repair.

== See also ==
- Microspore, spores that develop into male gametophytes
