= Sporophyte =

Diploid multicellular stage in the life cycle of a plant or alga

Diagram showing the alternation of generations between a diploid sporophyte (bottom) and a haploid gametophyte (top)

A sporophyte (/ˈspɔːr.əˌfaɪt/) is one of the two alternating multicellular phases in the life cycles of plants and algae. It is a diploid multicellular organism which produces asexual spores. This stage alternates with a multicellular haploid gametophyte phase.

== Life cycle ==
The sporophyte develops from the zygote produced when a haploid egg cell is fertilized by a haploid sperm and each sporophyte cell therefore has a double set of chromosomes, one set from each parent. All land plants, and most multicellular algae, have life cycles in which a multicellular diploid sporophyte phase alternates with a multicellular haploid gametophyte phase. In the seed plants, the largest groups of which are the gymnosperms (bare seeds) and angiosperms (fruiting plants), the sporophyte phase is more prominent than the gametophyte, and is the familiar green plant with its roots, stem, leaves and cones or flowers. In flowering plants, the gametophytes are very reduced in size, and are represented by the germinated pollen and the embryo sac.

The sporophyte produces spores (hence the name) by meiosis, a process also known as "reduction division" that reduces the number of chromosomes in each spore mother cell by half. The resulting meiospores develop into a gametophyte. Both the spores and the resulting gametophyte are haploid, meaning they only have one set of chromosomes. Meiosis in the diploid sporophyte provides a direct DNA repair capability for dealing with DNA damages, including oxidative DNA damages, in germline reproductive tissues.

The mature gametophyte produces male or female gametes (or both) by mitosis. The fusion of male and female gametes produces a diploid zygote which develops into a new sporophyte. This cycle is known as alternation of generations or alternation of phases.

== Examples ==
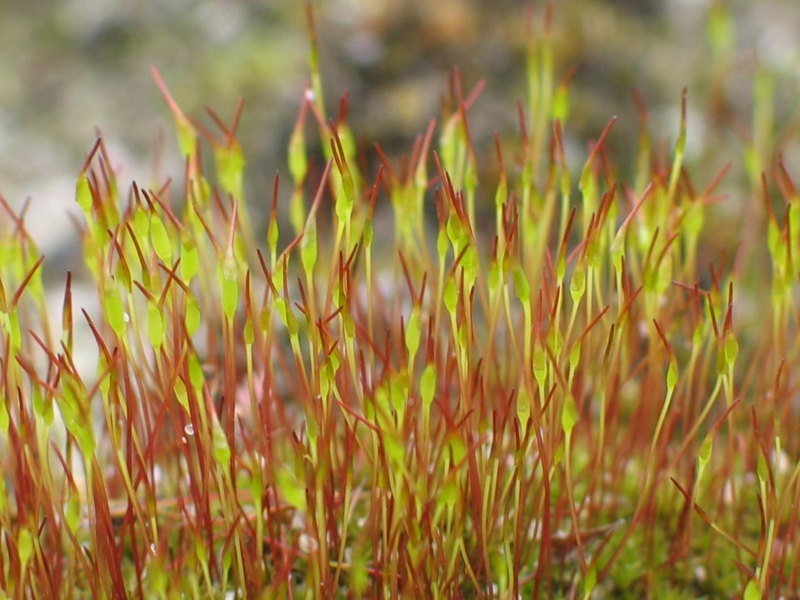
Young sporophytes of the common moss Tortula muralis. In mosses, the gametophyte is the dominant generation, while the sporophytes consist of sporangium-bearing stalks growing from the tips of the gametophytes

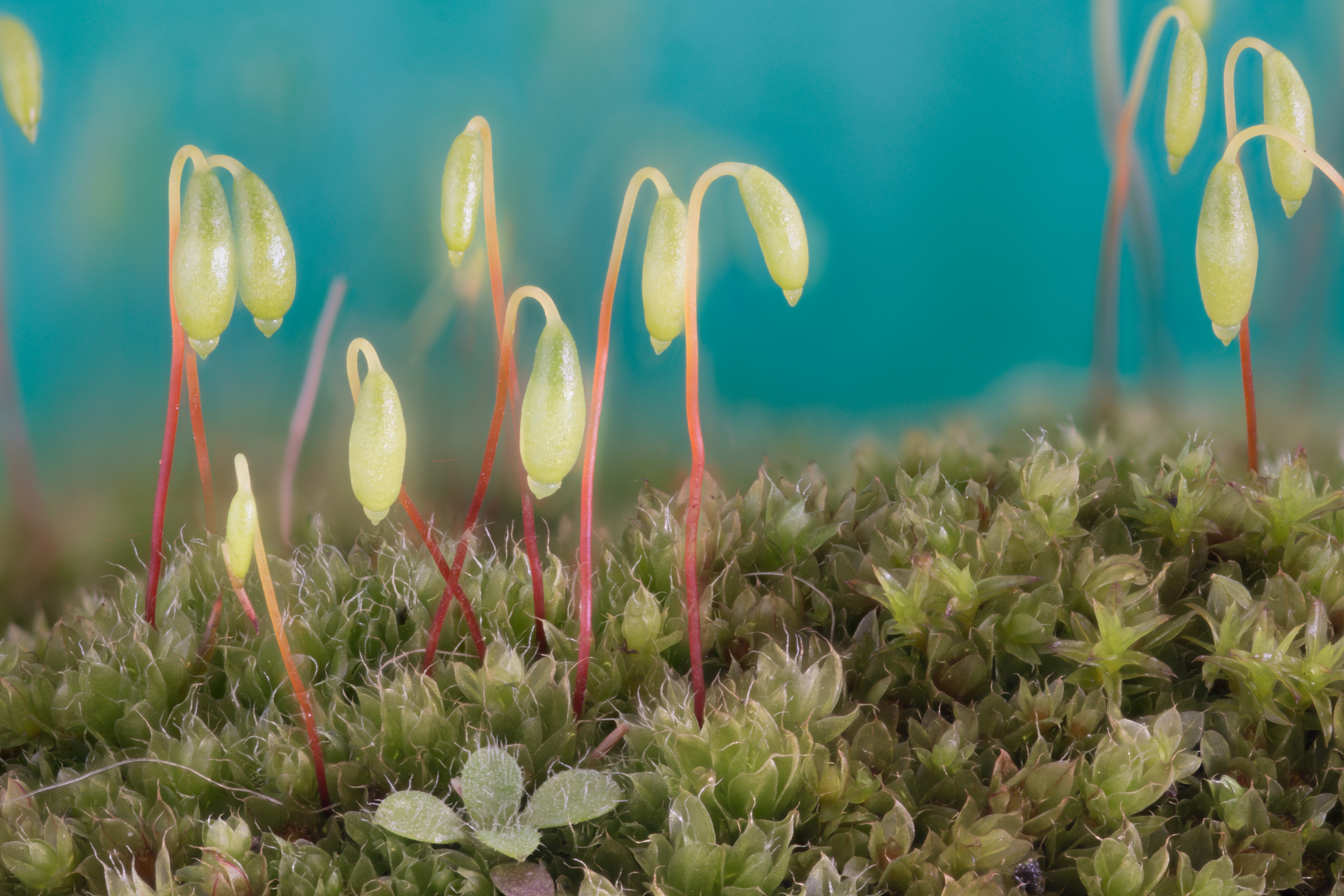
Sporophytes of moss during spring

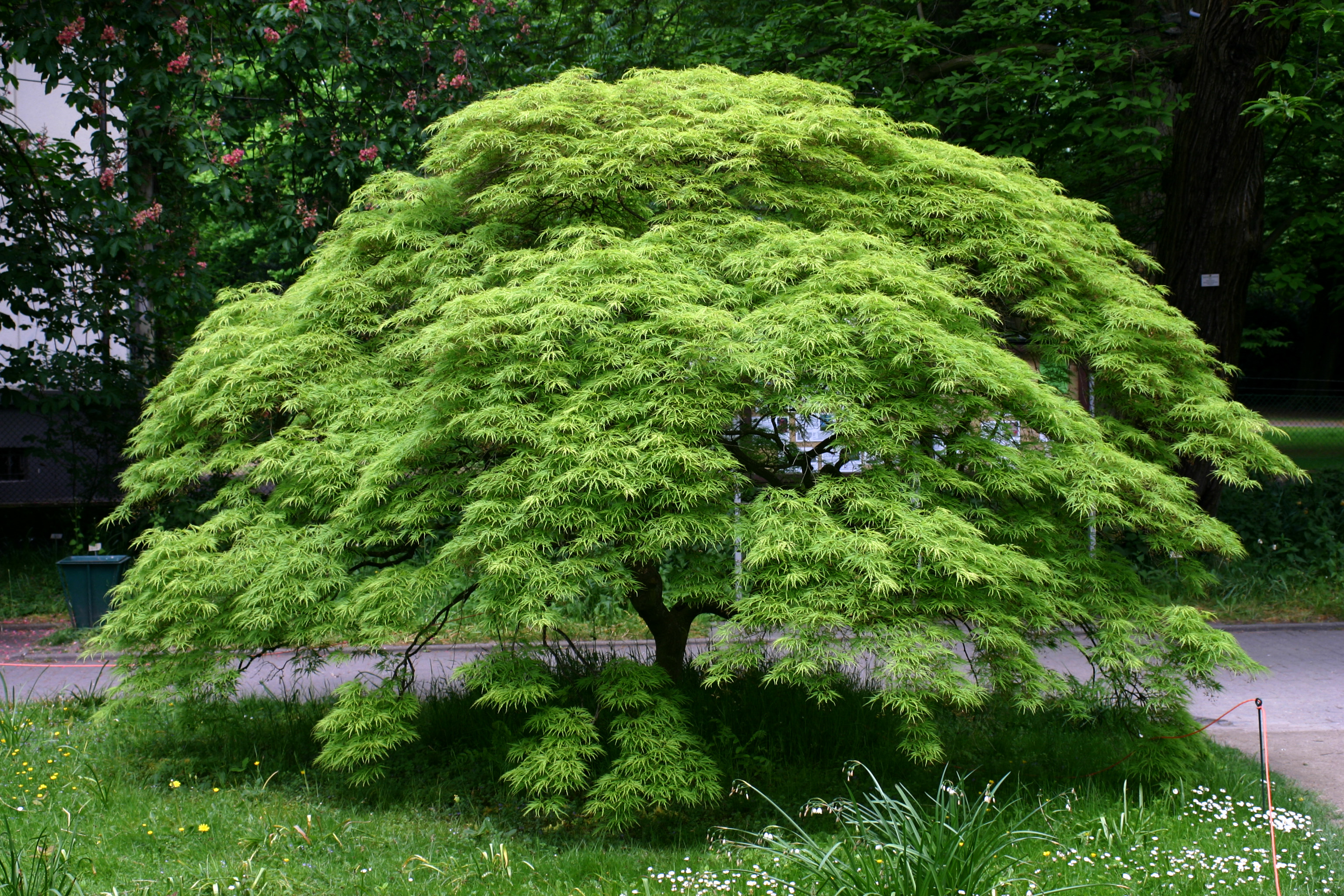
In flowering plants, the sporophyte comprises the whole multicellular body except the pollen and embryo sac

Bryophytes (mosses, liverworts and hornworts) have a dominant gametophyte phase on which the adult sporophyte is dependent for nutrition. The embryo sporophyte develops by cell division of the zygote within the female sex organ or archegonium, and in its early development is therefore nurtured by the gametophyte. Because this embryo-nurturing feature of the life cycle is common to all land plants they are known collectively as the embryophytes.

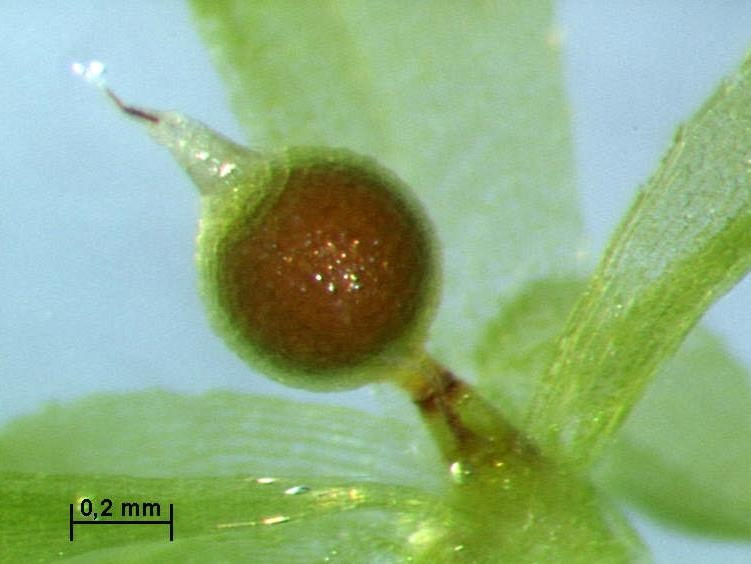
Cleistocarpous sporophyte of the moss Physcomitrella patens

Most algae have dominant gametophyte generations, but in some species the gametophytes and sporophytes are morphologically similar (isomorphic). An independent sporophyte is the dominant form in all clubmosses, horsetails, ferns, gymnosperms, and angiosperms that have survived to the present day. Early land plants had sporophytes that produced identical spores (isosporous or homosporous) but the ancestors of the gymnosperms evolved complex heterosporous life cycles in which the spores producing male and female gametophytes were of different sizes, the female megaspores tending to be larger, and fewer in number, than the male microspores.

== Evolutionary history ==
During the Devonian period several plant groups independently evolved heterospory and subsequently the habit of endospory, in which the gametophytes develop in miniaturized form inside the spore wall. By contrast in exosporous plants, including modern ferns, the gametophytes break the spore wall open on germination and develop outside it. The megagametophytes of endosporic plants such as the seed ferns developed within the sporangia of the parent sporophyte, producing a miniature multicellular female gametophyte complete with female sex organs, or archegonia. The oocytes were fertilized in the archegonia by free-swimming flagellate sperm produced by windborne miniaturized male gametophytes in the form of pre-pollen. The resulting zygote developed into the next sporophyte generation while still retained within the pre-ovule, the single large female meiospore or megaspore contained in the modified sporangium or nucellus of the parent sporophyte. The evolution of heterospory and endospory were among the earliest steps in the evolution of seeds of the kind produced by gymnosperms and angiosperms today. The rRNA genes seems to escape global methylation machinery in bryophytes, unlike seed plants.

== See also ==
- Alternation of generations
