= Double fertilization =

Complex fertilization mechanism of flowering plants

The parts of a flower

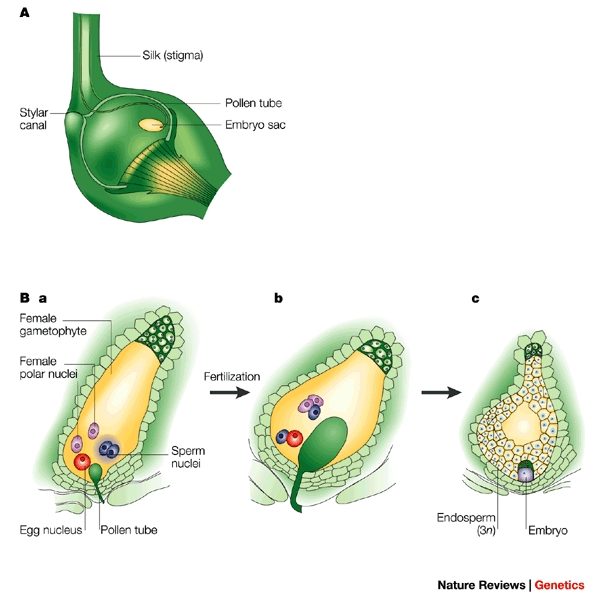
Double fertilization

Double fertilization or double fertilisation (see spelling differences) is a complex fertilization mechanism of angiosperms. This process involves the fusion of a female gametophyte or megagametophyte, also called the embryonic sac, with two male gametes (sperm). It begins when a pollen grain adheres to the stigmatic surface of the carpel, the female reproductive structure of angiosperm flowers. The pollen grain begins to germinate (unless a type of self-incompatibility that acts in the stigma occurs in that particular species is activated), forming a pollen tube that penetrates and extends down through the style toward the ovary as it follows chemical signals released by the egg. The tip of the pollen tube then enters the ovary by penetrating the micropyle opening in the ovule, and releases two sperm into the embryonic sac (megagametophyte).

The mature embryonic sac of an unfertilized ovule is 7-cellular and 8-nucleate. It is arranged in the form of 3+1+3 (from top to bottom) i.e. 3 antipodal cells, 1 central cell (binucleate), 2 synergids & 1 egg cell. One sperm fertilizes the egg cell and the other sperm fuses with the two polar nuclei of the large central cell of the megagametophyte. The haploid sperm and haploid egg fuse to form a diploid zygote, the process being called syngamy, while the other sperm and the diploid central cell fuse to form a triploid primary endosperm cell (triple fusion). Some plants may form polyploid nuclei. The large cell of the gametophyte will then develop into the endosperm, a nutrient-rich tissue which nourishes the developing embryo. The ovary, surrounding the ovules, develops into the fruit, which protects the seeds and may function to disperse them.

The two central cell maternal nuclei (polar nuclei) that contribute to the endosperm, arise by mitosis from the same single meiotic product that gave rise to the egg. The maternal contribution to the genetic constitution of the triploid endosperm is double that of the sperm.

In a study conducted in 2008 of the plant Arabidopsis thaliana, the migration of male nuclei inside the female gamete, in fusion with the female nuclei, has been documented for the first time using in vivo imaging. Some of the genes involved in the migration and fusion process have also been determined.

Evidence of double fertilization in Gnetales, which are non-flowering seed plants, has been reported.

== Brief history ==
Double fertilization was discovered more than a century ago by Sergei Nawaschin in Kyiv, and Léon Guignard in France. Each made the discovery independently of the other. Lilium martagon and Fritillaria tenella were used in the first observations of double fertilization, which were made using the classical light microscope. Due to the limitations of the light microscope, there were many unanswered questions regarding the process of double fertilization. However, with the development of the electron microscope, many of the questions were answered. Most notably, the observations made by the group of W. Jensen showed that the male gametes did not have any cell walls and that the plasma membrane of the gametes is close to the plasma membrane of the cell that surrounds them inside the pollen grain.

== Double fertilization in gymnosperms ==
A far more rudimentary form of double fertilization occurs in the sexual reproduction of an order of gymnosperms commonly known as Gnetales. Specifically, this event has been documented in both Ephedra and Gnetum, a subset of gnetophytes. In Ephedra nevadensis, a single binucleate sperm cell is deposited into the egg cell. Following the initial fertilization event, the second sperm nucleus is diverted to fertilize an additional egg nucleus found in the egg cytoplasm. In most other seed plants, this second 'ventral canal nucleus' is normally found to be functionally useless. In Gnetum gnemon, numerous free egg nuclei exist in female cytoplasm inside the female gametophyte. Succeeding the penetration of the mature female gametophyte by the pollen tube, female cytoplasm and free nuclei move to surround the pollen tube. Released from the binucleate sperm cell are two sperm nuclei which then fuse with free egg nuclei to produce two viable zygotes, a homologous characteristic between families Ephedra and Gnetum. In both families, the second fertilization event produces an additional diploid embryo. This supernumerary embryo is later aborted, leading to the synthesis of only one mature embryo. The additional fertilization product in Ephedra does not nourish the primary embryo, as the female gametophyte is responsible for nutrient provision. The more primitive process of double fertilization in gymnosperms results in two diploid nuclei enclosed in the same egg cell. This differs from the angiosperm condition, which results in the separation of the egg cell and endosperm. Comparative molecular research on the genome of G. gnemon has revealed that gnetophytes are more closely related to conifers than they are to angiosperms. The rejection of the anthophyte hypothesis, which identifies gnetales and angiosperms as sister taxa, leads to speculation that the process of double fertilization is a product of convergent evolution and arose independently among gnetophytes and angiosperms.

== In vitro double fertilization ==
In vitro double fertilization is often used to study the molecular interactions as well as other aspects of gamete fusion in flowering plants. One of the major obstacles in developing an in vitro double fertilization between male and female gametes is the confinement of the sperm in the pollen tube and the egg in the embryonic sac. A controlled fusion of the egg and sperm has already been achieved with poppy plants. Pollen germination, pollen tube entry, and double fertilization processes have all been observed to proceed normally. In fact, this technique has already been used to obtain seeds in various flowering plants and was named “test-tube fertilization”.

== Related structures and functions ==
=== Megagametophyte ===
The female gametophyte, the megagametophyte, that participates in double fertilization in angiosperms which is haploid is called the embryonic sac. This develops within an ovule, enclosed by the ovary at the base of a carpel. Surrounding the megagametophyte are (one or) two integuments, which form an opening called the micropyle. The megagametophyte, which is usually haploid, originates from the (usually diploid) megaspore mother cell, also called the megasporocyte. The next sequence of events varies, depending on the particular species, but in most species, the following events occur. The megasporocyte undergoes meiosis, producing four haploid megaspores. Only one of the four resulting megaspores survives. This megaspore undergoes three rounds of mitosis, resulting in seven cells with eight haploid nuclei (the central cell has two nuclei, called the polar nuclei). The lower end of the embryonic sac consists of the haploid egg cell positioned in the middle of two other haploid cells, called synergids. The synergids function in the attraction and guidance of the pollen tube to the megagametophyte through the micropyle. At the upper end of the megagametophyte are three antipodal cells.

=== Microgametophyte ===
The male gametophytes, or microgametophytes, that participate in double fertilization are contained within pollen grains. They develop within the microsporangia, or pollen sacs, of the anthers on the stamens. Each microsporangium contains diploid microspore mother cells, or microsporocytes. Each microsporocyte undergoes meiosis, forming four haploid microspores, each of which can eventually develop into a pollen grain. A microspore undergoes mitosis and cytokinesis in order to produce two separate cells, the generative cell and the tube cell. These two cells in addition to the spore wall make up an immature pollen grain. As the male gametophyte matures, the generative cell passes into the tube cell, and the generative cell undergoes mitosis, producing two sperm cells. Once the pollen grain has matured, the anthers break open, releasing the pollen. The pollen is carried to the pistil of another flower, by wind or animal pollinators, and deposited on the stigma. As the pollen grain germinates, the tube cell produces the pollen tube, which elongates and extends down the long style of the carpel and into the ovary, where its sperm cells are released in the megagametophyte. Double fertilization proceeds from here.

== See also ==
- Fertilisation
- Gamete
- Megaspore
- Oosphere
- Ovule
- Pollen
