= Microsporangium =

Sporangia that produce spores that give rise to male gametophytes

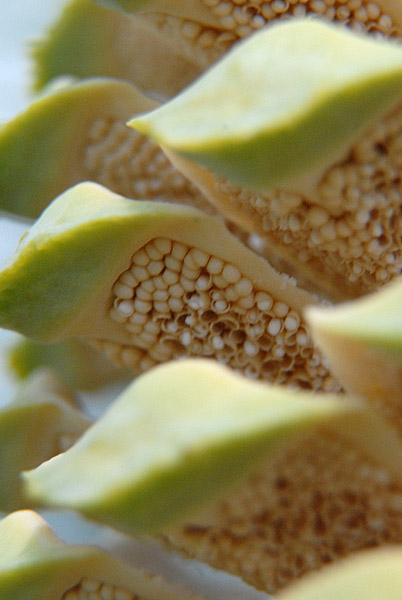
Encephalartos villosus microsporophylls with microsporangia

A microsporangium (pl. microsporangia) is a sporangium that produces microspores that give rise to male gametophytes when they germinate. Microsporangia occur in all vascular plants that have heterosporic life cycles, such as seed plants, spike mosses and the aquatic fern genus Azolla. In gymnosperms and angiosperm anthers, the microsporangia produce microsporocytes, the microspore mother cells, which then produce four microspores through the process of meiosis. Microsporocytes are produced in the microsporangia of gymnosperm cones and the anthers of angiosperms. They are diploid microspore mother-cells, which then produce four haploid microspores by meiosis. These become pollen grains, within which the microspores divide twice by mitosis to produce a very simple gametophyte.

Heterosporous plants that produced microspores in microsporangia and megaspores in separate megasporangia evolved independently in several plant groups during the Devonian period. Fossils of these plants show that they produced endosporic gametophytes, meaning that their gametophytes were not free-living as in bryophytes but developed within the spores, as in modern heterosporic vascular plants.

In angiosperms, a very young anther (the part of the stamen that contains the pollen) consists of actively dividing meristematic cells surrounded by a layer of epidermis. It then becomes two-lobed. Each anther lobe develops two pollen sacs, so each anther has four pollen sacs. Development of pollen sacs begins with the differentiation of archesporial cells in the hypodermal region below epidermis at four corners of the young anther. The archesporial cells divide by periclinal division to give a subepidermal primary parietal layer and a primary sporogenous layer. The cells of the primary parietal layer divide by successive periclinal and anticlinal divisions to form concentric layers of pollen sac wall.

The wall layers from periphery to center consist of:

- A single layer of epidermis, which becomes stretched and shrivels off at maturity
- A single layer of endothecium. The cells of endothecium have fibrous thickenings.
- One to three middle layers. Cells of these layers generally disintegrate in the mature anther
- A single layer of tapetum. The tapetal cells may be uni-, bi- or multinucleate and possess dense cytoplasm. The cells of the primary sporogenous layer divide further and give rise to diploid sporogenous tissue.
