= Ovule =

Female plant reproductive structure

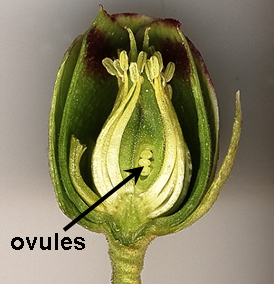
Location of ovules inside a Helleborus foetidus flower

The ovule (from Latin: ovulum) is a small structure present in a seed plant's floral ovary that gives rise to and contains its female reproductive cells. It consists of three parts: the integument, forming its outer layer, the nucellus (or remnant of the megasporangium), and the female gametophyte (formed from a haploid megaspore) in its center. The female gametophyte — specifically termed a megagametophyte — is also called the embryo sac in angiosperms. The megagametophyte produces an egg cell for the purpose of fertilization. The ovule is attached to the placenta by a stalk called a "funicle" that nourishes it. On the basis of the relative position of micropyle, body of the ovule, chalaza and funicle, there are six types of ovules.

== Location within the plant ==
In flowering plants, the ovule is located inside the portion of the flower called the gynoecium. The ovary of the gynoecium produces one or more ovules and ultimately becomes the fruit wall. Ovules are attached to the placenta in the ovary through a stalk-like structure known as a funiculus (plural, funiculi). Different patterns of ovule attachment, or placentation, can be found among plant species, these include:

- Apical placentation: The placenta is at the apex (top) of the ovary. Simple or compound ovary.
- Axile placentation: The ovary is divided into radial segments, with placentas in separate locules. Ventral sutures of carpels meet at the centre of the ovary. Placentae are along fused margins of carpels. Two or more carpels. (e.g. Hibiscus, Citrus, Solanum)
- Basal placentation: The placenta is at the base (bottom) of the ovary on a protrusion of the thalamus (receptacle). Simple or compound carpel, unilocular ovary. (e.g. Sonchus, Helianthus, Asteraceae)
- Free-central placentation: Derived from axile as partitions are absorbed, leaving ovules at the central axis. Compound unilocular ovary. (e.g. Stellaria, Dianthus)
- Marginal placentation: Simplest type. There is only one elongated placenta on one side of the ovary, as ovules are attached at the fusion line of the carpel's margins . This is conspicuous in legumes. Simple carpel, unilocular ovary. (e.g. Pisum)
- Parietal placentation: Placentae on inner ovary wall within a non-sectioned ovary, corresponding to fused carpel margins. Two or more carpels, unilocular ovary. (e.g. Brassica)
- Superficial placentation: Similar to axile, but placentae are on inner surfaces of multilocular ovary (e.g. Nymphaea)

In gymnosperms such as conifers, ovules are borne on the surface of an ovuliferous (ovule-bearing) scale, usually within an ovulate cone (also called megastrobilus). In the early extinct seed ferns, ovules were borne on the surface of leaves. In the most recent of these taxa, a cupule (a modified branch or group of branches) surrounded the ovule (e.g. Caytonia or Glossopteris).

== Parts and development ==
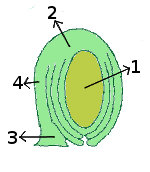
Ovule structure (anatropous) 1: nucellus 2: chalaza 3: funiculus 4: raphe

Ovule orientation may be anatropous, such that when inverted the micropyle faces the placenta (this is the most common ovule orientation in flowering plants), amphitropous, campylotropous, or orthotropous (anatropous are common and micropyle is in downward position and chalazal end in on the upper position hence, in amphitropous the anatropous arrangement is tilted 90 degrees and in orthotropous it is completely inverted) . The ovule appears to be a megasporangium with integuments surrounding it. Ovules are initially composed of diploid maternal tissue, which includes a megasporocyte (a cell that will undergo meiosis to produce megaspores). Megaspores remain inside the ovule and divide by mitosis to produce the haploid female gametophyte or megagametophyte, which also remains inside the ovule. The remnants of the megasporangium tissue (the nucellus) surround the megagametophyte. Megagametophytes produce archegonia (lost in some groups such as flowering plants), which produce egg cells. After fertilization, the ovule contains a diploid zygote and then, after cell division begins, an embryo of the next sporophyte generation. In flowering plants, a second sperm nucleus fuses with other nuclei in the megagametophyte forming a typically polyploid (often triploid) endosperm tissue, which serves as nourishment for the young sporophyte.

=== Integuments, micropyle, chalaza and hilum ===
Plant ovules: Gymnosperm ovule on left, angiosperm ovule (inside ovary) on right

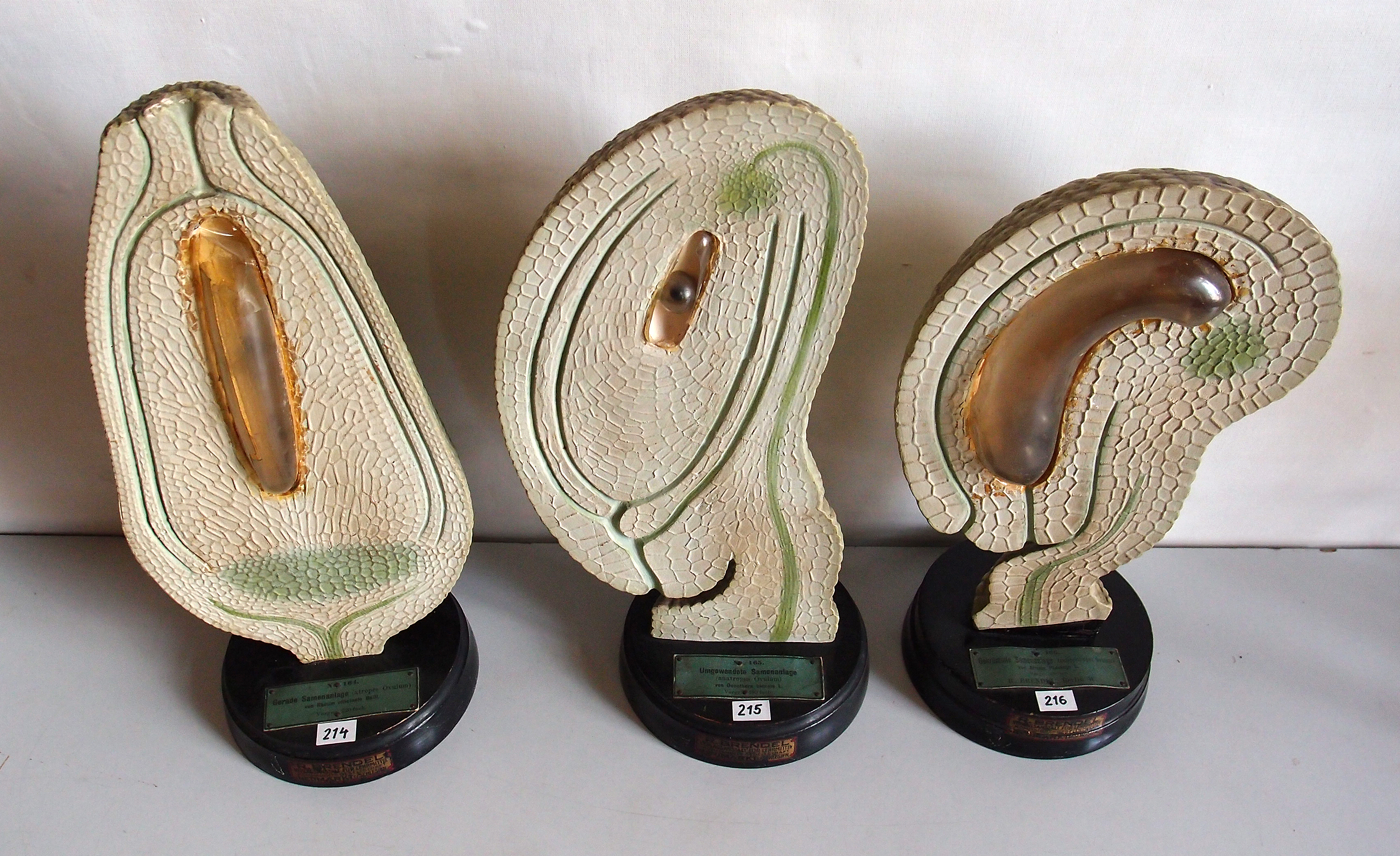
Models of different ovules, Botanical Museum Greifswald

An integument is a protective layer of cells surrounding the ovule. Gymnosperms typically have one integument (unitegmic) while angiosperms typically have two integuments (bitegmic). The evolutionary origin of the inner integument (which is integral to the formation of ovules from megasporangia) has been proposed to be by enclosure of a megasporangium by sterile branches (telomes). Elkinsia, a preovulate taxon, has a lobed structure fused to the lower third of the megasporangium, with the lobes extending upwards in a ring around the megasporangium. This might, through fusion between lobes and between the structure and the megasporangium, have produced an integument.

The origin of the second or outer integument has been an area of active contention for some time. The cupules of some extinct taxa have been suggested as the origin of the outer integument. A few angiosperms produce vascular tissue in the outer integument, the orientation of which suggests that the outer surface is morphologically abaxial. This suggests that cupules of the kind produced by the Caytoniales or Glossopteridales may have evolved into the outer integument of angiosperms.

The integuments develop into the seed coat when the ovule matures after fertilization.

The integuments do not enclose the nucellus completely but retain an opening at the apex referred to as the micropyle. The micropyle opening allows the pollen (a male gametophyte) to enter the ovule for fertilization. In gymnosperms (e.g., conifers), the pollen is drawn into the ovule on a drop of fluid that exudes out of the micropyle, the so-called pollination drop mechanism. Subsequently, the micropyle closes. In angiosperms, only a pollen tube enters the micropyle. During germination, the seedling's radicle emerges through the micropyle.

Located opposite from the micropyle is the chalaza where the nucellus is joined to the integuments. Nutrients from the plant travel through the phloem of the vascular system to the funiculus and outer integument and from there apoplastically and symplastically through the chalaza to the nucellus inside the ovule. In chalazogamous plants, the pollen tubes enter the ovule through the chalaza instead of the micropyle opening.

=== Nucellus, megaspore and perisperm ===
The nucellus (plural: nucelli) is part of the inner structure of the ovule, forming a layer of diploid (sporophytic) cells immediately inside the integuments. It is structurally and functionally equivalent to the megasporangium. In immature ovules, the nucellus contains a megasporocyte (megaspore mother cell), which undergoes sporogenesis via meiosis. In the megasporocyte of Arabidopsis thaliana, meiosis depends on the expression of genes that facilitate DNA repair and homologous recombination.

In gymnosperms, three of the four haploid spores produced in meiosis typically degenerate, leaving one surviving megaspore inside the nucellus. Among angiosperms, however, a wide range of variation exists in what happens next. The number (and position) of surviving megaspores, the total number of cell divisions, whether nuclear fusions occur, and the final number, position and ploidy of the cells or nuclei all vary. A common pattern of embryo sac development (the Polygonum type maturation pattern) includes a single functional megaspore followed by three rounds of mitosis. In some cases, however, two megaspores survive (for example, in Allium and Endymion). In some cases all four megaspores survive, for example in the Fritillaria type of development (illustrated by Lilium in the figure) there is no separation of the megaspores following meiosis, then the nuclei fuse to form a triploid nucleus and a haploid nucleus. The subsequent arrangement of cells is similar to the Polygonum pattern, but the ploidy of the nuclei is different.

After fertilization, the nucellus may develop into the perisperm that feeds the embryo. In some plants, the diploid tissue of the nucellus can give rise to the embryo within the seed through a mechanism of asexual reproduction called nucellar embryony.

=== Megagametophyte ===
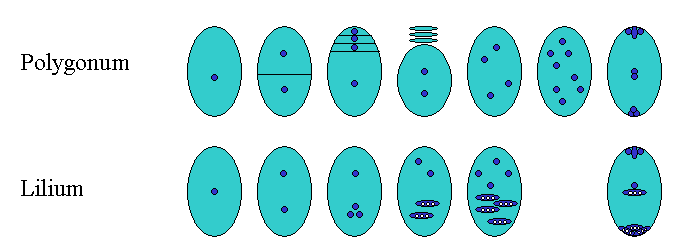
Megagametophyte formation of the genera Polygonum and Lilium. Triploid nuclei are shown as ellipses with three white dots. The first three columns show the meiosis of the megaspore, followed by 1–2 mitoses.

Ovule with megagametophyte: egg cell (yellow), synergids (orange), central cell with two polar nuclei (bright green), and antipodals (dark green)

The haploid megaspore inside the nucellus gives rise to the female gametophyte, called the megagametophyte.

In gymnosperms, the megagametophyte consists of around 2000 nuclei and forms archegonia, which produce egg cells for fertilization.

In flowering plants, the megagametophyte (also referred to as the embryo sac) is much smaller and typically consists of only seven cells and eight nuclei. This type of megagametophyte develops from the megaspore through three rounds of mitotic divisions. The cell closest to the micropyle opening of the integuments differentiates into the egg cell, with two synergid cells by its side that are involved in the production of signals that guide the pollen tube. Three antipodal cells form on the opposite (chalazal) end of the ovule and later degenerate. The large central cell of the embryo sac contains two polar nuclei.

=== Zygote, embryo and endosperm ===
The pollen tube releases two sperm nuclei into the ovule. In gymnosperms, fertilization occurs within the archegonia produced by the female gametophyte. While it is possible that several egg cells are present and fertilized, typically only one zygote will develop into a mature embryo as the resources within the seed are limited.

In flowering plants, one sperm nucleus fuses with the egg cell to produce a zygote, the other fuses with the two polar nuclei of the central cell to give rise to the polyploid (typically triploid) endosperm. This double fertilization is unique to flowering plants, although in some other groups the second sperm cell does fuse with another cell in the megagametophyte to produce a second embryo. The plant stores nutrients such as starch, proteins, and oils in the endosperm as a food source for the developing embryo and seedling, serving a similar function to the yolk of animal eggs. The endosperm is also called the albumen of the seed. The zygote then develops into a megasporophyte, which in turn produces one or more megasporangia. The ovule, with the developing megasporophyte, may be described as either tenuinucellate or crassinucellate. The former has either no cells or a single cell layer between the megasporophyte and the epidermal cells, while the latter has multiple cell layers between.

Embryos may be described by a number of terms including Linear (embryos have axile placentation and are longer than broad), or rudimentary (embryos are basal in which the embryo is tiny in relation to the endosperm).

=== Types of gametophytes ===
Megagametophytes of flowering plants may be described according to the number of megaspores developing, as either monosporic, bisporic, or tetrasporic. (RF)

== See also ==
- Gynoecium
- Ovum
- Alternation of generations
- Meiosis
- Oogenesis
- Placentation

== Bibliography ==
- P.H. Raven, R.F. Evert, S.E. Eichhorn (2005): Biology of Plants, 7th Edition, W.H. Freeman and Company Publishers, New York, ISBN 0-7167-1007-2
- Peter K. Endress.Angiosperm ovules: diversity, development, evolution. Ann Bot (2011) 107 (9): 1465-1489. doi: 10.1093/aob/mcr120
- Tsou, C.-H. (1994). "Ovules tenuinucellate". Glossary for Vascular Plants. The William & Lynda Steere Herbarium, New York Botanical Garden.
