= Endosperm =

Tissue inside seeds that is starchy in cereals and liquid in coconuts

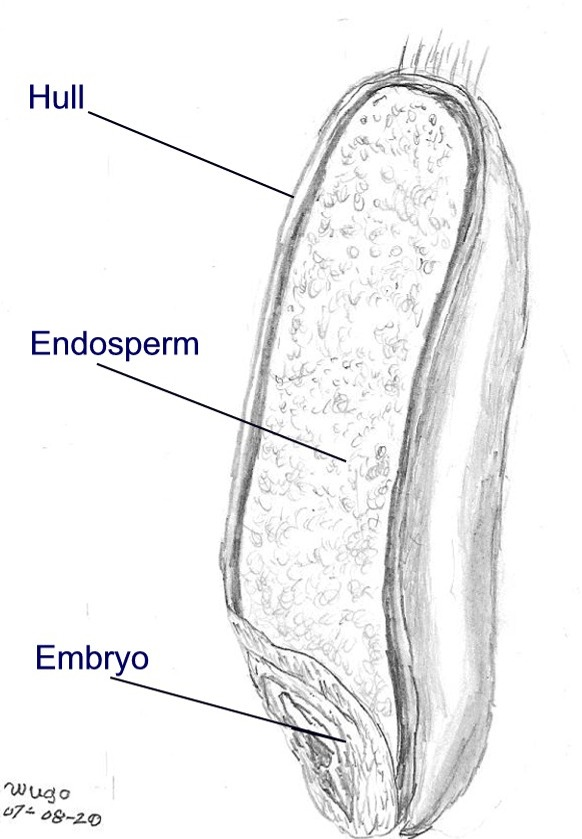
Wheat seed

The endosperm is a tissue produced inside the seeds of most flowering plants following double fertilization. It is triploid (meaning three chromosome sets per nucleus) in most species, which may be auxin-driven. It surrounds the embryo and provides nutrition in the form of starch, though it can also contain oils and protein. This can make endosperm a source of nutrition in animal diet. For example, wheat endosperm is ground into flour for bread (in whole wheat flour, the rest of the grain is also included), while barley endosperm is the main source of sugars for beer production. Other examples of endosperm that forms the bulk of the edible portion are coconut "meat" and coconut "water", and corn. Some plants, such as certain orchids, lack endosperm in their seeds.

Ancestral flowering plants have seeds with small embryos and abundant endosperm. In some modern flowering plants the embryo occupies most of the seed and the endosperm is non-developed or consumed before the seed matures. In other flowering plant taxa, the Poaceae for example, the endosperm is greatly developed.

== Double fertilization ==
An endosperm is formed after the two sperm nuclei inside a pollen grain reach the interior of a female gametophyte or megagametophyte, also called the embryonic sac. One sperm nucleus fertilizes the egg cell, forming a zygote, while the other sperm nucleus usually fuses with the binucleate central cell, forming a primary endosperm cell (its nucleus is often called the triple fusion nucleus). That cell created in the process of double fertilization develops into the endosperm. Because it is formed by a separate fertilization event, the endosperm is a separate entity from the developing embryo, and some consider it to be a separate organism.

About 70% of angiosperm species have endosperm cells that are polyploid. These are typically triploid (containing three sets of chromosomes), but can vary widely from diploid (2n) to 15n.

One flowering plant, Nuphar polysepala, has diploid endosperm, resulting from the fusion of a pollen nucleus with one, rather than two, maternal nuclei. The same is supposed for some other basal angiosperms. It is believed that early in the development of angiosperm lineages, there was a duplication in this mode of reproduction, producing seven-celled/eight-nucleate female gametophytes, and triploid endosperms with a 2:1 maternal to paternal genome ratio.

Double fertilisation is a characteristic feature of angiosperms.

== Endosperm development ==
There are three types of endosperm development:

Nuclear endosperm development – where repeated free-nuclear divisions take place by suppression of cell wall formation; if a cell wall is formed it will form after free-nuclear divisions. Commonly referred to as liquid endosperm. Coconut water is an example of this.

Cellular endosperm development – where a cell-wall formation is coincident with nuclear divisions. Coconut meat is cellular endosperm. Aracaceae has cellular endosperm development while other monocots are helobial.

Helobial endosperm development – where a cell wall is laid down between the first two nuclei, after which one half develops endosperm along the cellular pattern and the other half along the nuclear pattern.

== Evolutionary origins ==
The evolutionary origins of double fertilization and endosperm are unclear, attracting researcher attention for over a century. There are the two major hypotheses:

- The double fertilization initially used to produce two identical, independent embryos ("twins"). Later these embryos acquired different roles, one growing into the mature organism, and another merely supporting it. Thus, the early endosperm was probably diploid, like the embryo. Some gymnosperms, such as Ephedra, may produce twin embryos by double fertilization. Either of these two embryos is capable of filling in the seed, but normally only one develops further (the other eventually aborts). Also, most basal angiosperms still contain the four-cell embryo sac and produce diploid endosperms.
- Endosperm is the evolutionary remnant of the actual gametophyte, similar to the complex multicellular gametophytes found in gymnosperms. In this case, acquisition of the additional nucleus from the sperm cell is a later evolutionary step. This nucleus may provide the parental (not only maternal) organism with some control over endosperm development. Becoming triploid or polyploid are later evolutionary steps of this "primary gametophyte". Nonflowering seed plants (conifers, cycads, Ginkgo, Ephedra) form a large homozygous female gametophyte to nourish the embryo within a seed.

The triploid transition - and the production of antipodal cells - may have occurred due to a shift in gametophyte development which produced a new interaction with an auxin-dependent mechanism originating in the earliest angiosperms.

== Role in seed development ==
In some groups (e.g. grains of the family Poaceae), the endosperm persists to the mature seed stage as a storage tissue, in which case the seeds are called "albuminous" or "endospermous", and in others it is absorbed during embryo development (e.g., most members of the family Fabaceae, including the common bean, Phaseolus vulgaris), in which case the seeds are called "exalbuminous" or "cotyledonous" and the function of storage tissue is performed by enlarged cotyledons ("seed leaves"). In certain species (e.g. corn, Zea mays); the storage function is distributed between both endosperm and the embryo. Some mature endosperm tissue stores fats (e.g. castor bean, Ricinus communis) and others (including grains, such as wheat and corn) store mainly starches.

The dust-like seeds of orchids have no endosperm. Orchid seedlings are mycoheterotrophic in their early development. In some other species, such as coffee, the endosperm also does not develop. Instead, the nucellus produces a nutritive tissue termed "perisperm". The endosperm of some species is responsible for seed dormancy. Endosperm tissue also mediates the transfer of nutrients from the mother plant to the embryo, it acts as a location for gene imprinting, and is responsible for aborting seeds produced from genetically mismatched parents. In angiosperms, the endosperm contain hormones such as cytokinins, which regulate cellular differentiation and embryonic organ formation.

== Cereal grains ==
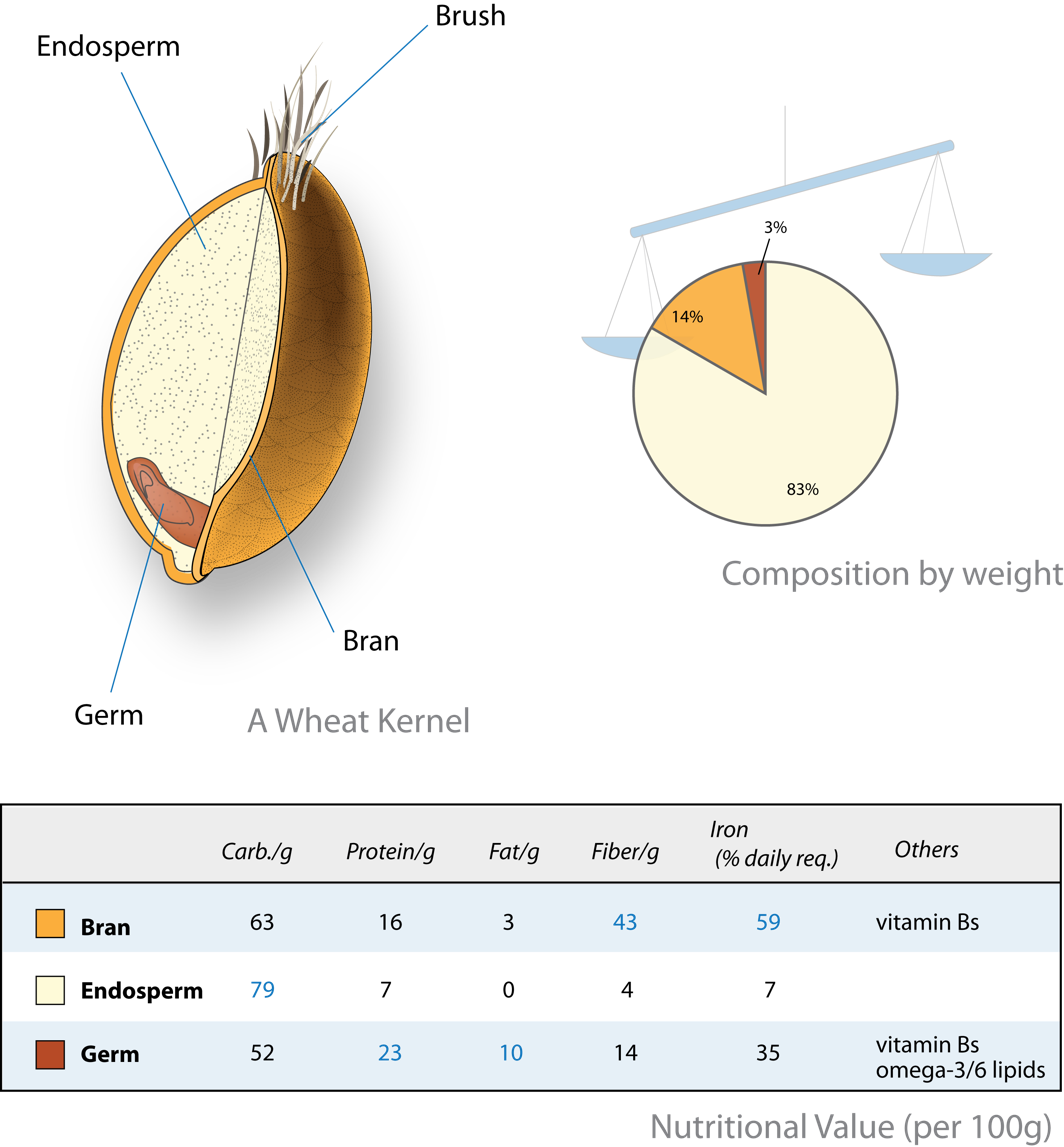

Cereal crops are grown for their edible fruit (grains or caryopses), which are primarily endosperm. In the caryopsis, the thin fruit wall is fused to the seed coat. Therefore, the nutritious part of the grain is the seed and its endosperm. In some cases (e.g. wheat, rice) the endosperm is selectively retained in food processing (commonly called white flour), and the embryo (germ) and seed coat (bran) removed. The processed grain has a lower quality of nutrition. Endosperm thus has an important role within the human diet worldwide.

The aleurone is the outer layer of endosperm cells, present in all small grains and retained in many dicots with transient endosperm. The cereal aleurone functions for both storage and digestion. During germination, it secretes the amylase enzyme that breaks down endosperm starch into sugars to nourish the growing seedling.

== See also ==
- Ovule
