= Megaspore =

Large spore in heterosporous plants that germinates into a female gametophyte

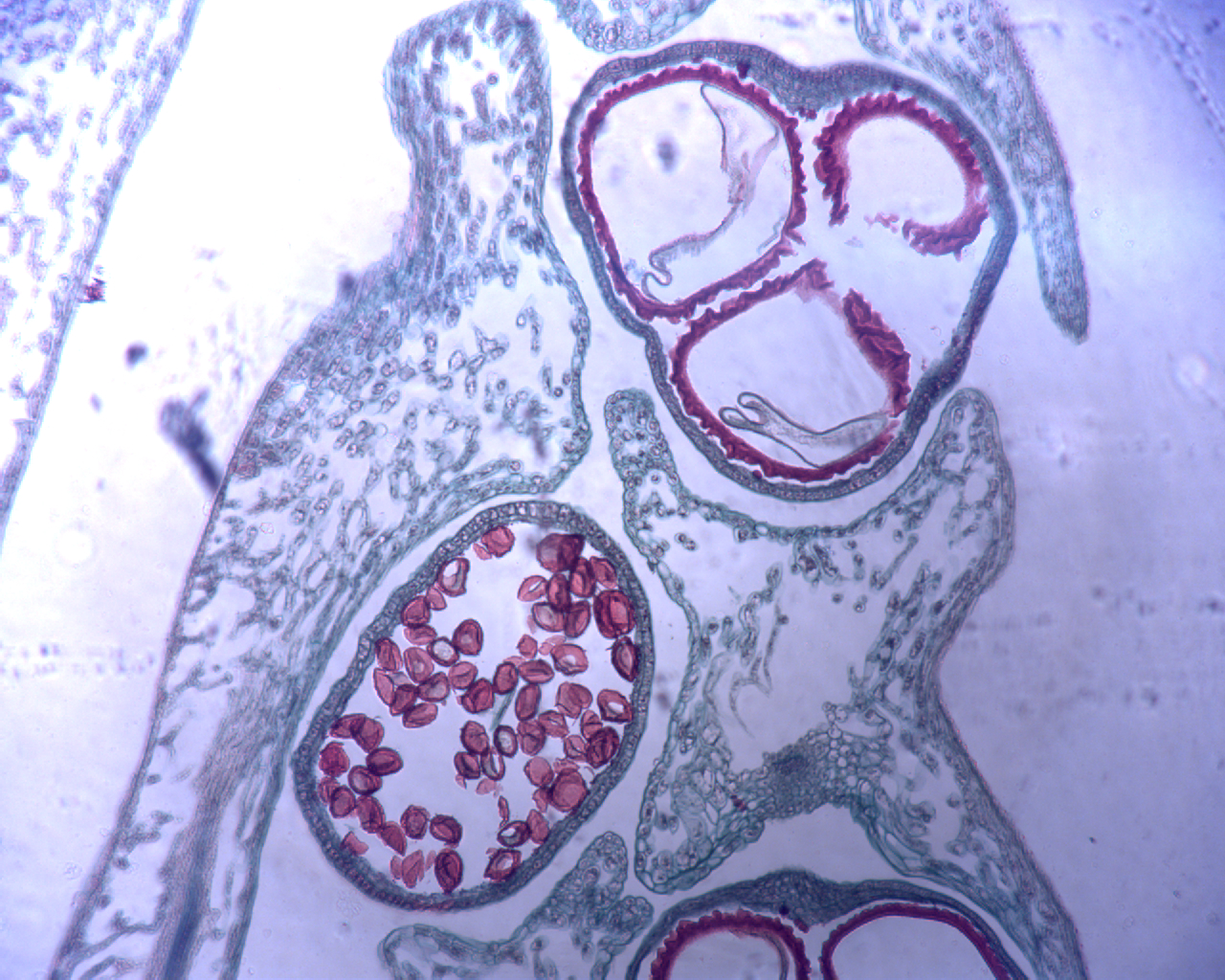
Microscopic photo of spores (in red) of Selaginella. The large three spores at the top are megaspores whereas the numerous smaller red spores at the bottom are microspores.

Megaspores, also called macrospores, are a type of spore that is present in heterosporous plants. These plants have two spore types, megaspores and microspores. Generally speaking, the megaspore, or large spore, germinates into a female gametophyte, which produces egg cells. These are fertilized by sperm produced by the male gametophyte developing from the microspore. Heterosporous plants include seed plants (gymnosperms and flowering plants), water ferns (Salviniales), spikemosses (Selaginellaceae) and quillworts (Isoetaceae).

== Megasporogenesis ==
In gymnosperms and flowering plants, the megaspore is produced inside the nucellus of the ovule. During megasporogenesis, a diploid precursor cell, the megasporocyte or megaspore mother cell, undergoes meiosis to produce initially four haploid cells (the megaspores). Angiosperms exhibit three patterns of megasporogenesis: monosporic, bisporic, and tetrasporic, also known as the Polygonum type, the Alisma type, and the Drusa type, respectively. The monosporic pattern occurs most frequently (>70% of angiosperms) and is found in many economically and biologically important groups such as Brassicaceae (e.g., Arabidopsis, Capsella, Brassica), Gramineae (e.g., maize, rice, wheat), Malvaceae (e.g., cotton), Leguminoseae (e.g., beans, soybean), and Solanaceae (e.g., pepper, tobacco, tomato, potato, petunia).

This pattern is characterized by cell plate formation after meiosis 1 & 2, which results in four one-nucleate megaspores, of which three degenerate. The bisporic pattern is characterized by cell plate formation only after meiosis 1, and results in two two-nucleate megaspores, of which one degenerates. The tetrasporic pattern is characterized by cell plates failing to form after either meiosis 1 or 2, and results in one four-nucleate megaspore. Therefore, each pattern gives rise to a single functional megaspore which contains one, two, or four meiotic nuclei, respectively. The megaspore then undergoes megagametogenesis to give rise to the female gametophyte.

== Megagametogenesis ==
Plant ovules with megasporocytes before meiosis: Gymnosperm ovule on left, angiosperm ovule (inside ovary) on right

After megasporogenesis, the megaspore develops into the female gametophyte (the embryo sac) in a process called megagametogenesis. The process of megagametogenesis varies depending on which pattern of megasporogenesis occurred. Some species, such as Tridax trilobata, Ehretia laevis, and Alectra thomsoni, can undergo different patterns of megasporogenesis and therefore different patterns of megagametogenesis. If the monosporic pattern occurred, the single nucleus undergoes mitosis three times, producing an eight-nucleate cell. These eight nuclei are arranged into two groups of four. These groups both send a nucleus to the center of the cell; these become the polar nuclei. Depending on the species, these nuclei fuse before or upon fertilization of the central cell. The three nuclei at the end of the cell near the micropylar become the egg apparatus, with an egg cell in the center and two synergids. At the other end of the cell, a cell wall forms around the nuclei and forms the antipodals. Therefore, the resulting embryo sac is a seven-celled structure consisting of one central cell, one egg cell, two synergid cells, and three antipodal cells.

The bisporic and tetrasporic patterns undergo varying processes and result in varying embryo sacs as well. In Lilium which has a tetrasporic pattern, the central cell of the embryo sac is 4n. Therefore, upon fertilization the endosperm will be 5n rather than the typical 3n.

== See also ==
- Megasporangium
- Microspore
- Spore
- Double fertilization
