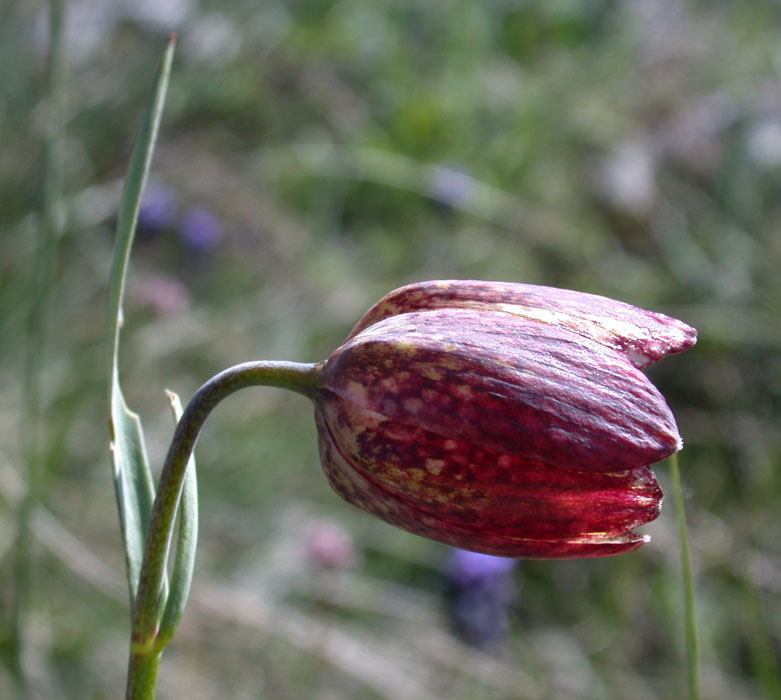

Scientific classification
- Kingdom: Plantae
- Clade: Tracheophytes
- Clade: Angiosperms
- Clade: Monocots
- Order: Liliales
- Family: Liliaceae
- Subfamily: Lilioideae
- Tribe: Lilieae
- Genus: Fritillaria
- Species: F. orientalis

Binomial name
- Fritillaria orientalis Adams

Synonyms
- Fritillaria racemosa Ker Gawl 1806, illegitimate homonym not Mill. 1768; Fritillaria tenella M.Bieb.

= Fritillaria orientalis =

Species of flowering plant

Fritillaria orientalis is a Eurasian species of monocotyledonous plant in the lily family Liliaceae. It was described by Johann Friedrich Adam in 1805, based on specimens collected in Ossetia.

This bulbous perennial flourishes on grass and brush in limestone valleys. The flowers, appearing in April and May, are purple, borne singly or in twos or threes.

The species grows in France, Italy, Austria, Bulgaria, Greece, Croatia, Bosnia and Herzegovina, Montenegro, Kosovo, Serbia, North Macedonia, Moldova, Ukraine, southern Russia, Turkey, and the Caucasus.

== Gallery ==
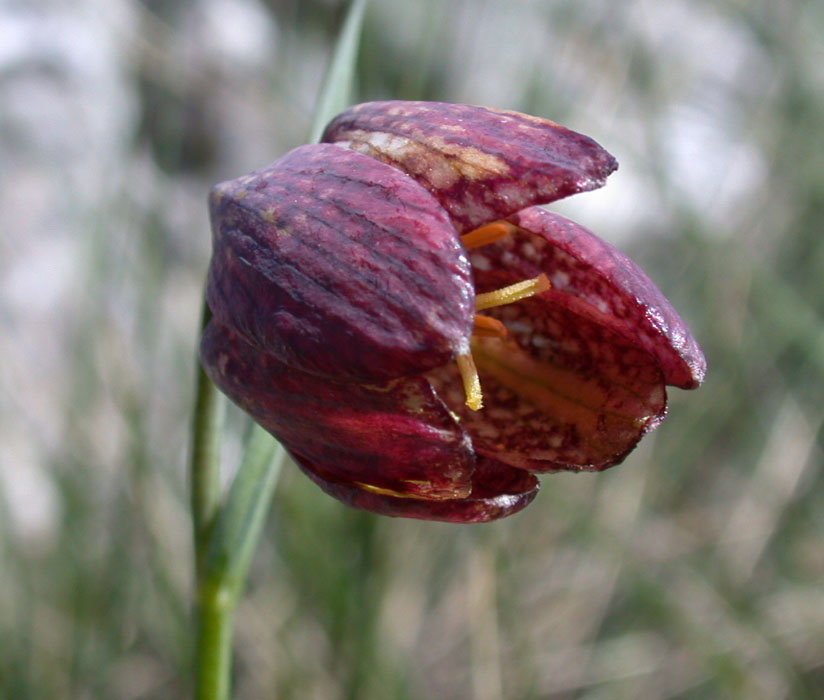
Flower detail

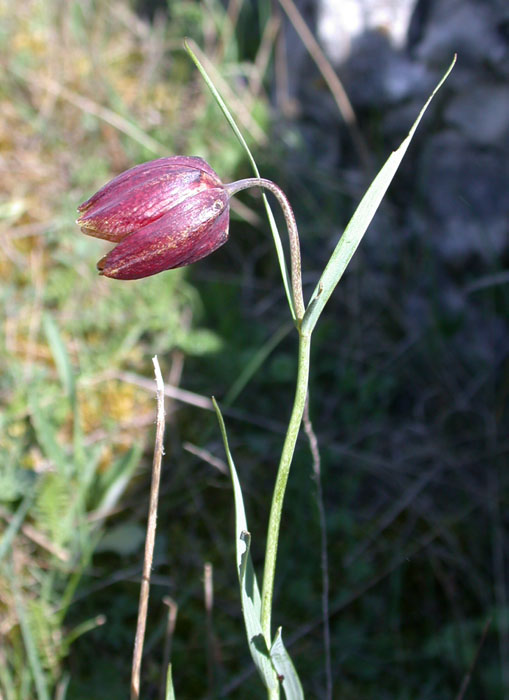
