= Gametophyte =

Haploid stage in the life cycle of plants and algae

Diagram showing the alternation of generations between a diploid sporophyte (bottom) and a haploid gametophyte (top)

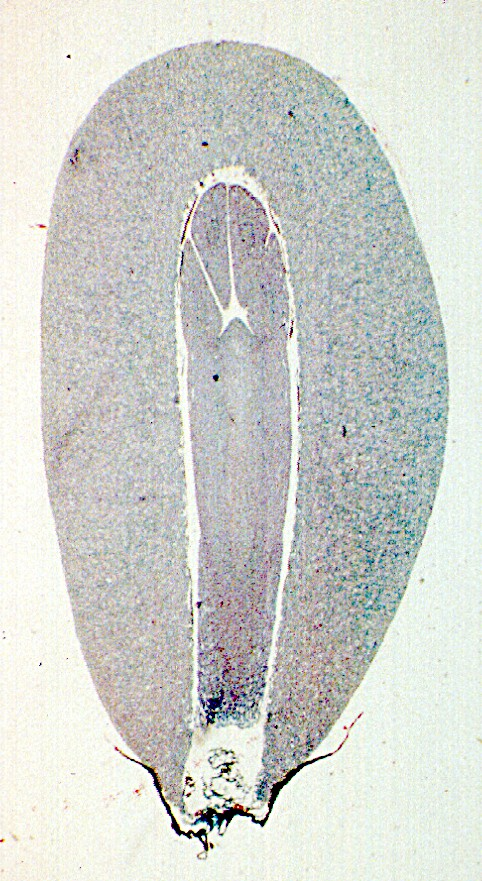
Pine gametophyte (outside) surrounding the embryo (inside)

A gametophyte (/ɡəˈmiːtəfaɪt/) is one of the two alternating multicellular phases in the life cycles of plants. It is a haploid multicellular organism that develops from a haploid spore, that has one set of chromosomes. The gametophyte is the sexual phase in the life cycle of plants and algae. It develops sex organs that produce gametes, haploid sex cells that participate in fertilization to form a diploid zygote, which has a double set of chromosomes. Cell division of the zygote results in a new diploid multicellular organism, the second stage in the life cycle known as the sporophyte. The sporophyte can produce haploid spores by meiosis that on germination produce a new generation of gametophytes.

== Algae ==
In some multicellular green algae (Ulva lactuca is one example), red algae and brown algae, sporophytes and gametophytes may be externally indistinguishable (isomorphic). In Ulva, the gametes are isogamous, all of one size, shape and general morphology.

== Land plants ==
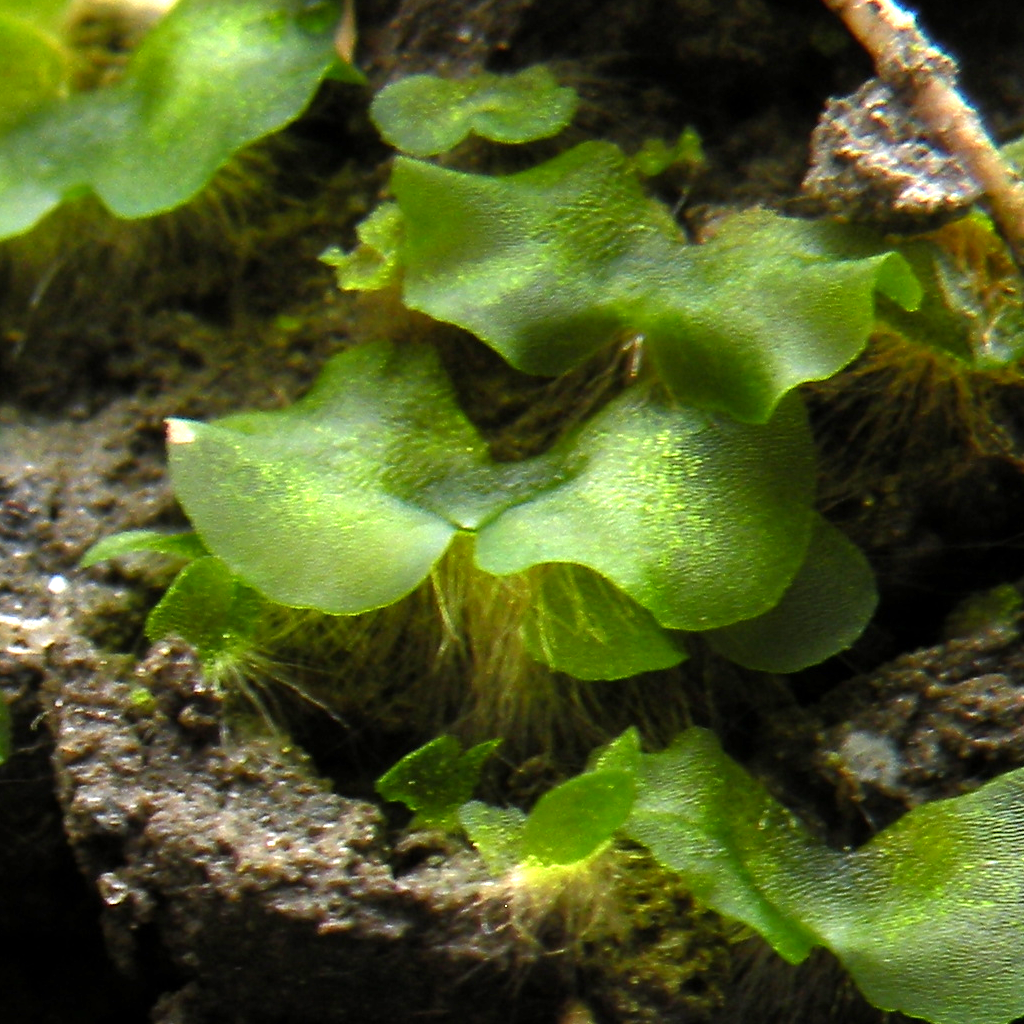
Several gametophytes growing in a terrarium

In land plants, anisogamy is universal. As in animals, female and male gametes are called, respectively, eggs and sperm. In extant land plants, either the sporophyte or the gametophyte may be reduced (heteromorphic). No extant gametophytes have stomata, but they have been found on fossil species like the early Devonian Aglaophyton from the Rhynie chert. Other fossil gametophytes found in the Rhynie chert shows they were much more developed than present forms, resembling the sporophyte in having a well-developed conducting strand, a cortex, an epidermis and a cuticle with stomata, but were much smaller.

=== Bryophytes ===
In bryophytes (mosses, liverworts, and hornworts), the gametophyte is the most visible stage of the life cycle. The bryophyte gametophyte is longer lived, nutritionally independent, and the sporophytes are attached to the gametophytes and dependent on them. When a moss spore germinates it grows to produce a filament of cells (called the protonema). The mature gametophyte of mosses develops into leafy shoots that produce sex organs (gametangia) that produce gametes. Eggs develop in archegonia and sperm in antheridia.

In some bryophyte groups such as many liverworts of the order Marchantiales, the gametes are produced on specialized structures called gametophores (or gametangiophores).

=== Vascular plants ===
All vascular plants are sporophyte dominant, and a trend toward smaller and more sporophyte-dependent female gametophytes is evident as land plants evolved reproduction by seeds. Those vascular plants, such as clubmosses and many ferns, that produce only one type of spore are said to be homosporous. They have exosporic gametophytes — that is, the gametophyte is free-living and develops outside of the spore wall. Exosporic gametophytes can either be bisexual, capable of producing both sperm and eggs in the same thallus (monoicous), or specialized into separate male and female organisms (dioicous).

In heterosporous vascular plants (plants that produce both microspores and megaspores), the gametophytes develop endosporically (within the spore wall). These gametophytes are dioicous, producing either sperm or eggs but not both.

==== Ferns ====
In most ferns, for example, in the leptosporangiate fern genus Dryopteris, the gametophyte is a photosynthetic free living autotrophic organism called a prothallus that produces gametes which engender the new sporophyte. The prothallus then maintains the sporophyte during its early multicellular development. However, in some groups, notably the clade that includes Ophioglossaceae and Psilotaceae, the gametophytes are subterranean and subsist by forming mycotrophic relationships with fungi. Homosporous ferns secrete a chemical called antheridiogen.

==== Lycophytes ====
Extant lycophytes produce two different types of gametophytes. In the homosporous families Lycopodiaceae and Huperziaceae, spores germinate into bisexual free-living, subterranean and mycotrophic gametophytes that derive nutrients from symbiosis with fungi. In Isoetes and Selaginella, which are heterosporous, microspores and megaspores are dispersed from sporangia either passively or by active ejection. Microspores produce microgametophytes which produce sperm. Megaspores produce reduced megagametophytes inside the spore wall. At maturity, the megaspore cracks open at the trilete suture to allow the male gametes to access the egg cells in the archegonia inside. The gametophytes of Isoetes appear to be similar in this respect to those of the extinct Carboniferous arborescent lycophytes Lepidodendron and Lepidostrobus.

==== Seed plants ====
The seed plant (spermatophyte) gametophyte life cycle is even more reduced than in basal taxa (ferns and lycophytes). Seed plant gametophytes are not independent organisms and depend upon the dominant sporophyte tissue for nutrients and water. With the exception of mature pollen, if the gametophyte tissue is separated from the sporophyte tissue it will not survive. Due to this complex relationship and the small size of the gametophyte tissue—in some situations single celled—differentiating with the human eye or even a microscope between seed plant gametophyte tissue and sporophyte tissue can be a challenge. While seed plant gametophyte tissue is typically composed of mononucleate haploid cells (1 x n), specific circumstances can occur in which the ploidy does vary widely despite still being considered part of the gametophyte.

In gymnosperms, the male gametophytes are produced inside microspores within the microsporangia located inside male cones or microstrobili. In each microspore, a single gametophyte is produced, consisting of four haploid cells produced by meiotic division of a diploid microspore mother cell. At maturity, each microspore-derived gametophyte becomes a pollen grain. During its development, the water and nutrients that the male gametophyte requires are provided by the sporophyte tissue until they are released for pollination. The cell number of each mature pollen grain varies between the gymnosperm orders. Cycadophyta have 3 celled pollen grains while Ginkgophyta have 4 celled pollen grains. Gnetophyta may have 2 or 3 celled pollen grains depending on the species, and Coniferophyta pollen grains vary greatly ranging from single celled to 40 celled. One of these cells is typically a germ cell and other cells may consist of a single tube cell which grows to form the pollen tube, sterile cells, and/or prothallial cells which are both vegetative cells without an essential reproductive function. After pollination is successful, the male gametophyte continues to develop. If a tube cell was not developed in the microstrobilus, one is created after pollination via mitosis. The tube cell grows into the diploid tissue of the female cone and may branch out into the megastrobilus tissue or grow straight towards the egg cell. The megastrobilus sporophytic tissue provides nutrients for the male gametophyte at this stage. In some gymnosperms, the tube cell will create a direct channel from the site of pollination to the egg cell, in other gymnosperms, the tube cell will rupture in the middle of the megastrobilus sporophyte tissue. This occurs because in some gymnosperm orders, the germ cell is nonmobile and a direct pathway is needed, however, in Cycadophyta and Ginkgophyta, the germ cell is mobile due to flagella being present and a direct tube cell path from the pollination site to the egg is not needed. In most species the germ cell can be more specifically described as a sperm cell which mates with the egg cell during fertilization, though that is not always the case. In some Gnetophyta species, the germ cell will release two sperm nuclei that undergo a rare gymnosperm double fertilization process occurring solely with sperm nuclei and not with the fusion of developed cells. After fertilization is complete in all orders, the remaining male gametophyte tissue will deteriorate.

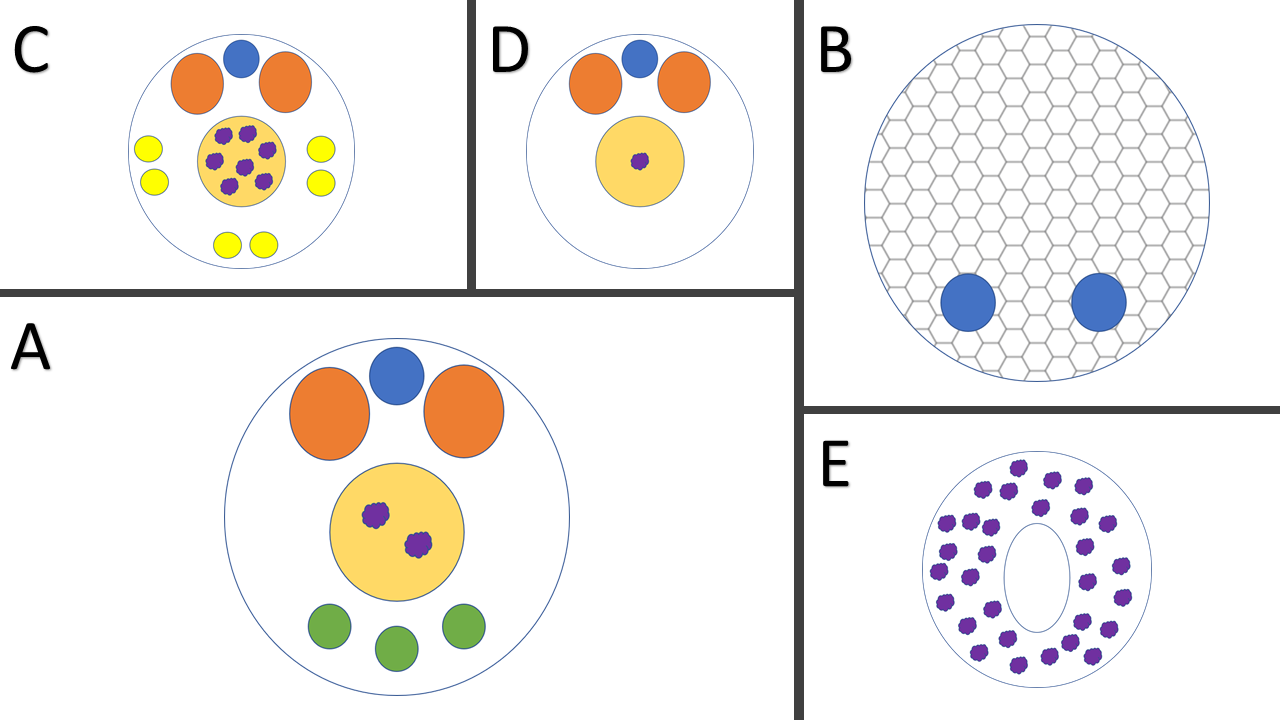
Multiple examples of the variation of cell number in mature seed plant female gametophytes prior to fertilization. Each cell contains one nucleus unless depicted otherwise. A: Typical 7 celled, 8 nucleate angiosperm female gametophyte (ex. Tilia americana). B: Typical gymnosperm female gametophyte with many haploid somatic cells illustrated with a honeycomb grid and two haploid germ cells (ex. Ginkgo biloba). C: Abnormally large 10 celled, 16 nucleate angiosperm female gametophyte (ex. Peperomia dolabriformis). D: Abnormally small 4 celled, 4 nucleate angiosperm female gametophyte (ex. Amborella trichopoda). E: Unusual gymnosperm female gametophyte that is singled celled with many free nuclei surrounding a pictured central vacuole (ex. Gnetum gnemon). Blue: egg cell. Dark orange: synergid cell. Yellow: accessory cell. Green: antipodal cell. Peach: central cell. Purple: individual nuclei.

The female gametophyte in gymnosperms differs from the male gametophyte as it spends its whole life cycle in one organ, the ovule located inside the megastrobilus or female cone. Similar to the male gametophyte, the female gametophyte normally is fully dependent on the surrounding sporophytic tissue for nutrients and the two organisms cannot be separated. However, the female gametophytes of Ginkgo biloba do contain chlorophyll and can produce some of their own energy, though, not enough to support itself without being supplemented by the sporophyte. The female gametophyte forms from a diploid megaspore that undergoes meiosis and starts being singled celled. The size of the mature female gametophyte varies drastically between gymnosperm orders. In Cycadophyta, Ginkgophyta, Coniferophyta, and some Gnetophyta, the single celled female gametophyte undergoes many cycles of mitosis ending up consisting of thousands of cells once mature. At a minimum, two of these cells are egg cells and the rest are haploid somatic cells, but more egg cells may be present and their ploidy, though typically haploid, may vary. In select Gnetophyta, the female gametophyte stays singled celled. Mitosis does occur, but no cell divisions are ever made. This results in the mature female gametophyte in some Gnetophyta having many free nuclei in one cell. Once mature, this single celled gametophyte is 90% smaller than the female gametophytes in other gymnosperm orders. After fertilization, the remaining female gametophyte tissue in gymnosperms serves as the nutrient source for the developing zygote (even in Gnetophyta where the diploid zygote cell is much smaller at that stage, and for a while lives within the single celled gametophyte).

The precursor to the male angiosperm gametophyte is a diploid microspore mother cell located inside the anther. Once the microspore undergoes meiosis, 4 haploid cells are formed, each of which is a singled celled male gametophyte. The male gametophyte will develop via one or two rounds of mitosis inside the anther. This creates a 2 or 3 celled male gametophyte which becomes known as the pollen grain once dehiscing occurs. One cell is the tube cell, and the remaining cell/cells are the sperm cells. The development of the three celled male gametophyte prior to dehiscing has evolved multiple times and is present in about a third of angiosperm species allowing for faster fertilization after pollination. Once pollination occurs, the tube cell grows in size and if the male gametophyte is only 2 cells at this stage, the single sperm cell undergoes mitosis to create a second sperm cell. Just like in gymnosperms, the tube cell in angiosperms obtains nutrients from the sporophytic tissue, and may branch out into the pistil tissue or grow directly towards the ovule. Once double fertilization is completed, the tube cell and other vegetative cells, if present, are all that remains of the male gametophyte and soon degrade.

The female gametophyte of angiosperms develops in the ovule (located inside the female or hermaphrodite flower). Its precursor is a diploid megaspore that undergoes meiosis which produces four haploid daughter cells. Three of these independent gametophyte cells degenerate and the one that remains is the gametophyte mother cell which normally contains one nucleus. In general, it will then divide by mitosis until it consists of 8 nuclei separated into 1 egg cell, 3 antipodal cells, 2 synergid cells, and a central cell that contains two nuclei. In select angiosperms, special cases occur in which the female gametophyte is not 7 celled with 8 nuclei. On the small end of the spectrum, some species have mature female gametophytes with only 4 cells, each with one nuclei. Conversely, some species have 10-celled mature female gametophytes consisting of 16 total nuclei. Once double fertilization occurs, the egg cell becomes the zygote which is then considered sporophyte tissue. Scholars still disagree on whether the fertilized central cell is considered gametophyte tissue. Some botanists consider this endospore as gametophyte tissue with typically 2/3 being female and 1/3 being male, but as the central cell before double fertilization can range from 1n to 8n in special cases, the fertilized central cells range from 2n (50% male/female) to 9n (1/9 male, 8/9th female). However, other botanists consider the fertilized endospore as sporophyte tissue. Some believe it is neither.

== Heterospory ==
In heterosporic plants, there are two distinct kinds of gametophytes. Because the two gametophytes differ in form and function, they are termed heteromorphic, from hetero- "different" and morph "form". The egg-producing gametophyte is known as a megagametophyte, because it is typically larger, and the sperm producing gametophyte is known as a microgametophyte. Species which produce egg and sperm on separate gametophytes plants are termed dioicous, while those that produce both eggs and sperm on the same gametophyte are termed monoicous.

In heterosporous plants (including water ferns, some lycophytes, as well as all gymnosperms and angiosperms), there are two distinct types of sporangia: microsporangia and megasporangia. These produce microspores and megaspores, respectively, each of which develops into a different type of gametophyte (male and female). However, heteromorphic (sexually distinct) gametophytes are not restricted to heterosporous plants. In some homosporous plants, a single type of spore can give rise to gametophytes that develop as male or female, although this differentiation is often influenced by environmental or physiological factors rather than being predetermined by spore type.

In seed plants, the microgametophyte is called pollen. Seed plant microgametophytes consists of several (typically two to five) cells when the pollen grains exit the sporangium. The megagametophyte develops within the megaspore of extant seedless vascular plants and within the megasporangium in a cone or flower in seed plants. In seed plants, the microgametophyte (pollen) travels to the vicinity of the egg cell (carried by a physical or animal vector) and produces two sperm by mitosis.

In gymnosperms, the megagametophyte consists of several thousand cells and produces one to several archegonia, each with a single egg cell. The gametophyte becomes a food storage tissue in the seed.

In angiosperms, the megagametophyte is reduced to only a few cells, and is sometimes called the embryo sac. A typical embryo sac contains seven cells and eight nuclei, one of which is the egg cell. Two nuclei fuse with a sperm nucleus to form the primary endospermic nucleus which develops to form triploid endosperm, which becomes the food storage tissue in the seed.

== See also ==
- Sporophyte – Diploid multicellular stage in the life cycle of a plant or alga
- Alternation of generations – Reproductive cycle of plants and algae
- Archegonium – Organ of the gametophyte of certain plants, producing and containing the ovum
- Antheridium – Part of a plant producing and containing male gametes
