= Microspore =

Small land plant spores that develop into male gametophytes

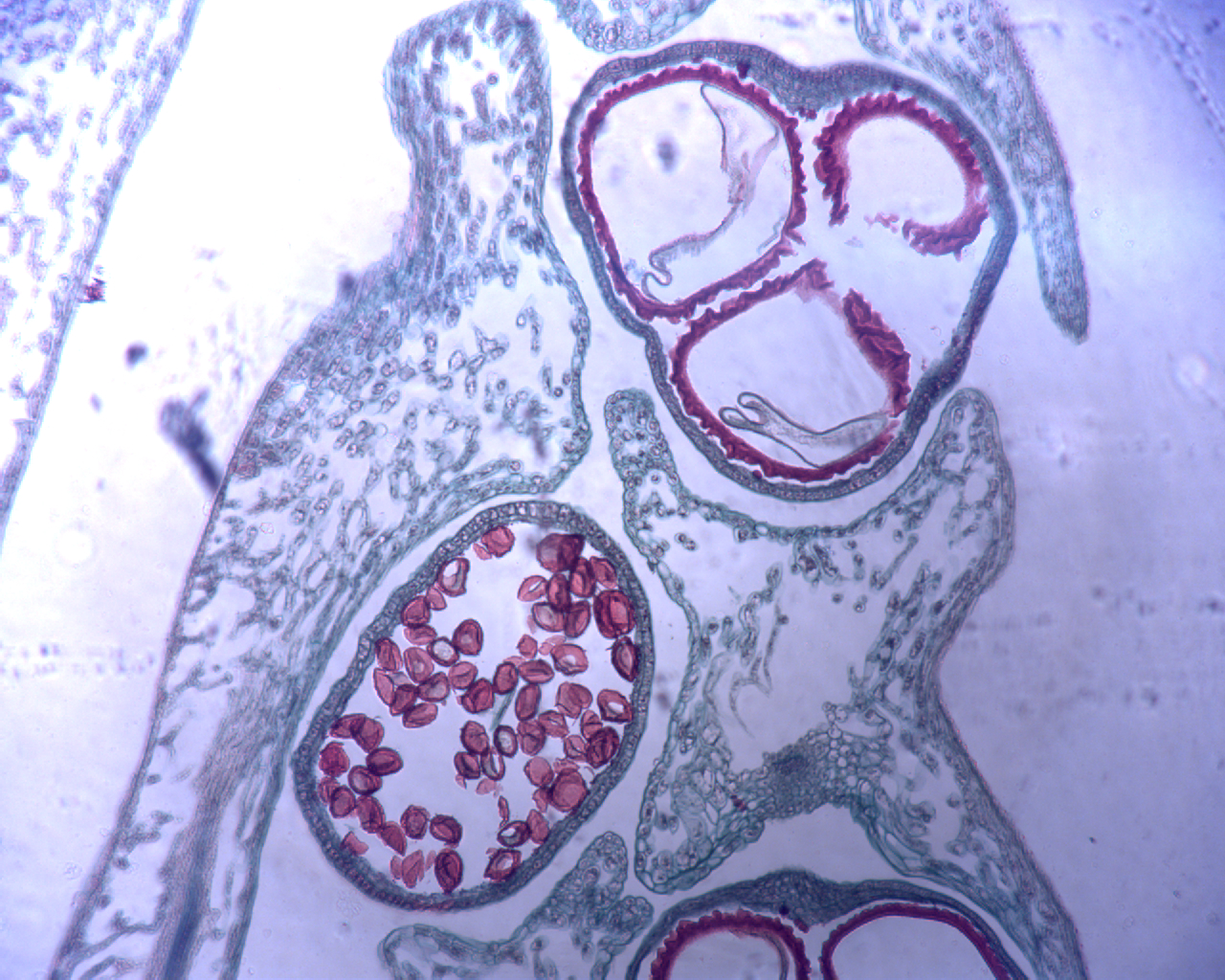
Microscopic photo of spores (in red) of Selaginella. The large three spores at the top are megaspores whereas the numerous smaller red spores at the bottom are microspores.

Microspores are land plant spores that develop into male gametophytes, whereas megaspores develop into female gametophytes. The male gametophyte gives rise to sperm cells, which are used for fertilization of an egg cell to form a zygote. Megaspores are structures that are part of the alternation of generations in many seedless vascular cryptogams, all gymnosperms and all angiosperms. Plants with heterosporous life cycles using microspores and megaspores arose independently in several plant groups during the Devonian period. Microspores are haploid, and are produced from diploid microsporocytes by meiosis.

== Morphology ==
The microspore has three different types of wall layers. The outer layer is called the perispore, the next is the exospore, and the inner layer is the endospore. The perispore is the thickest of the three layers while the exospore and endospore are relatively equal in width.

== Seedless vascular plants ==
In heterosporous seedless vascular plants, modified leaves called microsporophylls bear microsporangia containing many microsporocytes that undergo meiosis, each producing four microspores. Each microspore may develop into a male gametophyte consisting of a somewhat spherical antheridium within the microspore wall. Either 128 or 256 sperm cells with flagella are produced in each antheridium. The only heterosporous ferns are aquatic or semi-aquatic, including the genera Marsilea, Regnellidium, Pilularia, Salvinia, and Azolla. Heterospory also occurs in the lycopods in the spikemoss genus Selaginella and in the quillwort genus Isoëtes.

Types of seedless vascular plants:

- Water ferns
- Spikemosses
- Quillworts

== Gymnosperms ==
In seed plants the microspores develop into pollen grains each containing a reduced, multicellular male gametophyte. The megaspores, in turn, develop into reduced female gametophytes that produce egg cells that, once fertilized, develop into seeds. Pollen cones or microstrobili usually develop toward the tips of the lower branches in clusters up to 50 or more. The microsporangia of gymnosperms develop in pairs toward the bases of the scales, which are therefore called microsporophylls. Each of the microsporocytes in the microsporangia undergoes meiosis, producing four haploid microspores. These develop into pollen grains, each consisting of four cells and, in conifers, a pair of external air sacs. The air sacs give the pollen grains added buoyancy that helps with wind dispersal.

Types of Gymnosperms:

- Conifers
  - Pines
- Ginkgos
- Cycads
- Gnetophytes

== Angiosperms ==
As the anther of a flowering plant develops, four patches of tissue differentiate from the main mass of cells. These patches of tissue contain many diploid microsporocyte cells, each of which undergoes meiosis producing a quartet of microspores. Four chambers (pollen sacs) lined with nutritive tapetal cells are visible by the time the microspores are produced. After meiosis, the haploid microspores undergo several changes:

1. The microspore divides by mitosis producing two cells. The first of the cells (the generative cell) is small and is formed inside the second larger cell (the tube cell).
2. The members of each part of the microspores separate from each other.
3. A double-layered wall then develops around each microspore.

These steps occur in sequence and when complete, the microspores have become pollen grains.

== Embryogenesis ==
Although it is not the usual route of a microspore, this process is the most effective way of yielding haploid and double haploid plants through the use of male sex hormones. Under certain stressors such as heat or starvation, plants select for microspore embryogenesis. It was found that over 250 different species of angiosperms responded this way. In the anther, after a microspore undergoes microsporogenesis, it can deviate towards embryogenesis and become star-like microspores. The microspore can then go one of four ways: Become an embryogenic microspore, undergo callogenesis to organogenesis (haploid/double haploid plant), become a pollen-like structure or die.

Microspore embryogenesis is used in biotechnology to produce double haploid plants, which are immediately fixed as homozygous for each locus in only one generation. The haploid microspore is stressed to trigger the embryogenesis pathway and the resulting haploid embryo either doubles its genome spontaneously or with the help of chromosome doubling agents. Without this double haploid technology, conventional breeding methods would take several generations of selection to produce a homozygous line.

== See also ==
- Microsporangium
- Spore
- Megaspore
