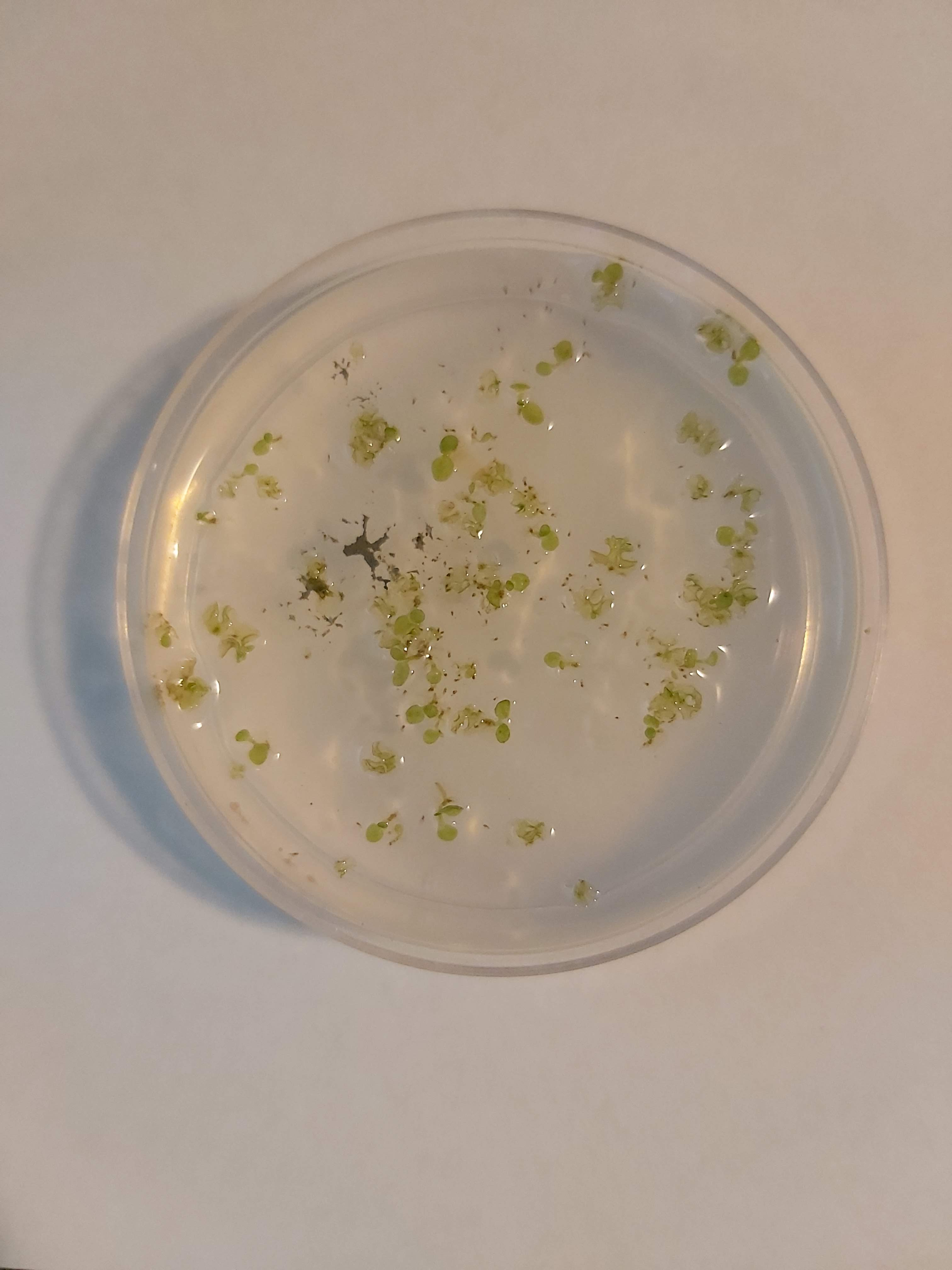
- "C-Fern" growing on agar media in cell culture dish

Conservation status
- Secure (NatureServe)

Scientific classification
- Kingdom: Plantae
- Clade: Embryophytes
- Clade: Tracheophytes
- Division: Polypodiophyta
- Class: Polypodiopsida
- Order: Polypodiales
- Family: Pteridaceae
- Genus: Ceratopteris
- Species: C. richardii

Binomial name
- Ceratopteris richardii Brongn.

= Ceratopteris richardii =

Triangle water fern

Species of aquatic plant

Ceratopteris richardii is a fern species belonging to the genus Ceratopteris, one of only two genera of the subfamily Parkerioideae of the family Pteridaceae. It is one of several genera of ferns adapted to an aquatic existence. C. richardii was previously regarded as being part of the species Ceratopteris thalictroides.

== "C-Fern" ==
This particular species is of special scientific interest because a patented strain, called "C-Fern", was developed as a scientific aid and teaching tool in biology in 1995. The use of "C-Fern" is facilitated by the fact that it grows readily in a cell-culture dish on agar media, reaching sexual maturity within 2–3 weeks of spore inoculation, with motile sperm cells being visible at this time. Over the course of about 6 weeks germination, sex determination and development of gametophytes, fertilization, embryogenesis, organogenesis, and sporophyte growth can all be observed, allowing an incredibly comprehensive study of the life cycle of homosporous ferns in a relatively short time period. In addition, due to the small size of the plant many specimens can be observed growing simultaneously, allowing for larger sample sizes in research studies. Following the culture of "C-Fern" in dishes it can be transplanted to a dirt substrate, where it can be further allowed to grow and future generations can be used for subsequent studies.

Monilophytes are generally studied far less than other groups of plants and a full genome sequence is not yet available - however, due to the development of "C-Fern", research into fern biology has been more prevalent and C. richardii has been used as a model organism to study vascular plant cell walls, alternation of generations (and associated mutations), genetics, population dynamics, and the effects of mitotic disrupter herbicides, among other topics. Despite being genetically identical the inoculated spores can give rise to both hermaphrodites and male gametophytes, depending on the secretion of antheridiogen; this phenomenon has been used to study plant pheromones and the cascade of events that leads to epigenetic changes in ferns. The ability to switch from bisexual to all male spores may provide an evolutionary advantage by promoting outbreeding.

The use of C. richardii in genetic research studies has been valuable to understanding fern and plant evolution as a whole, and in 2019 "C-Fern" became the first homosporous fern to have its genome partially assembled, thus acting as a reference genome to which other ferns can be compared.

C. richardii spores germinated in space in 1999 on shuttle mission STS-93, making them one of the few plants to be grown in space.

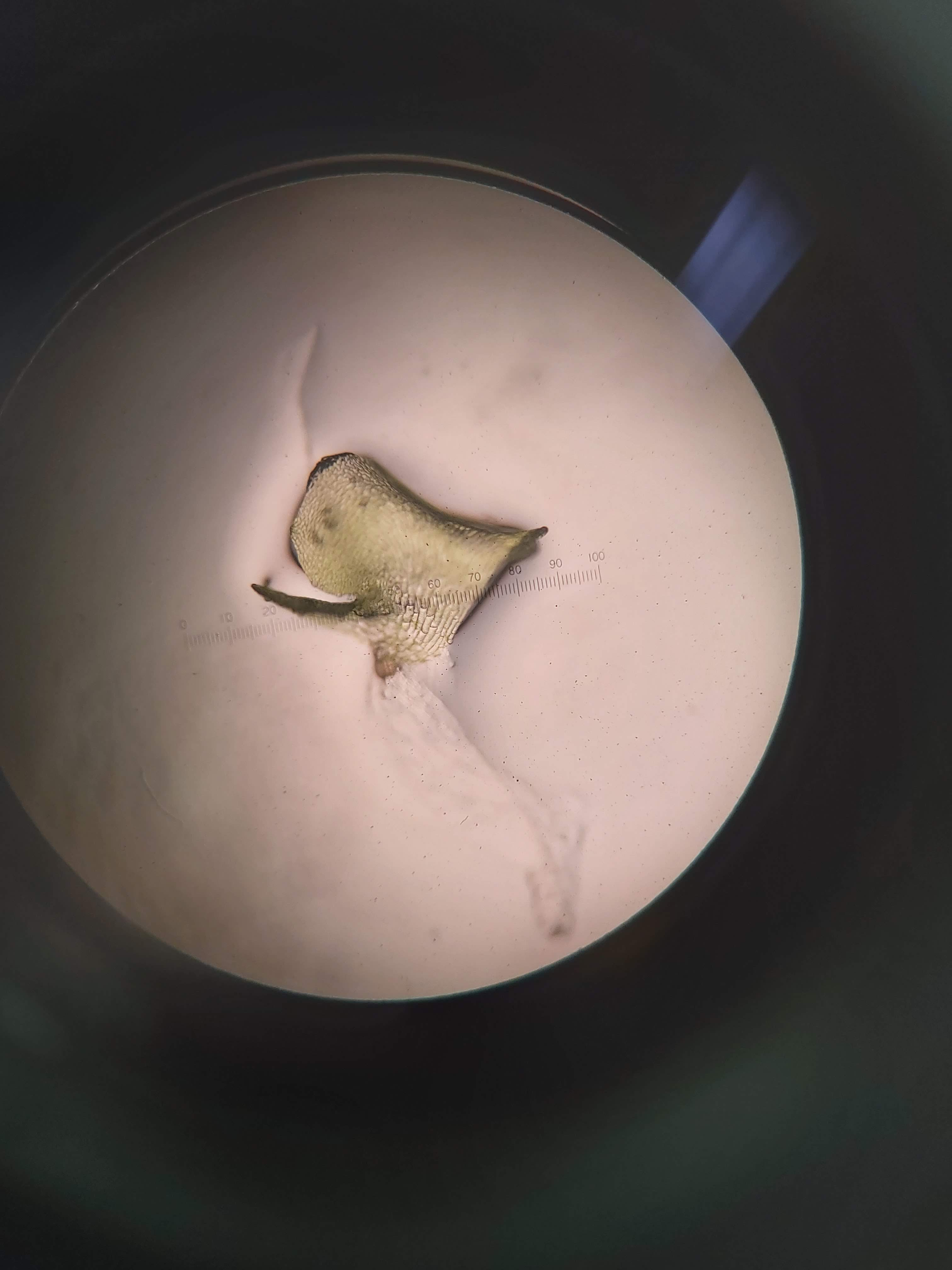
Development of "C-Fern" at 1 week after inoculation of spores onto agar media. Observed under bright field light microscopy.

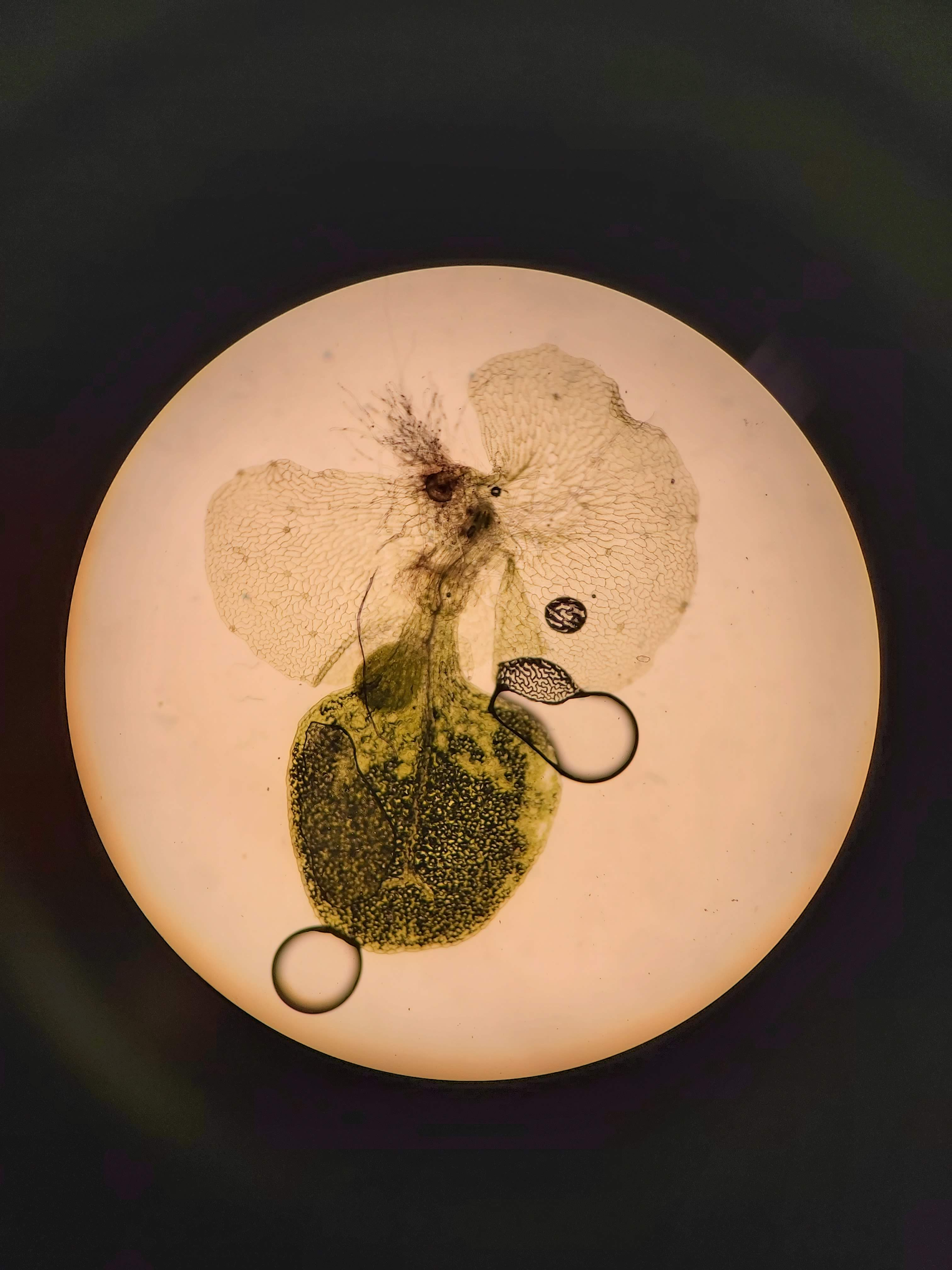
Development of "C-Fern" at 3 weeks after inoculation of spores onto agar media. Observed under bright field light microscopy.
