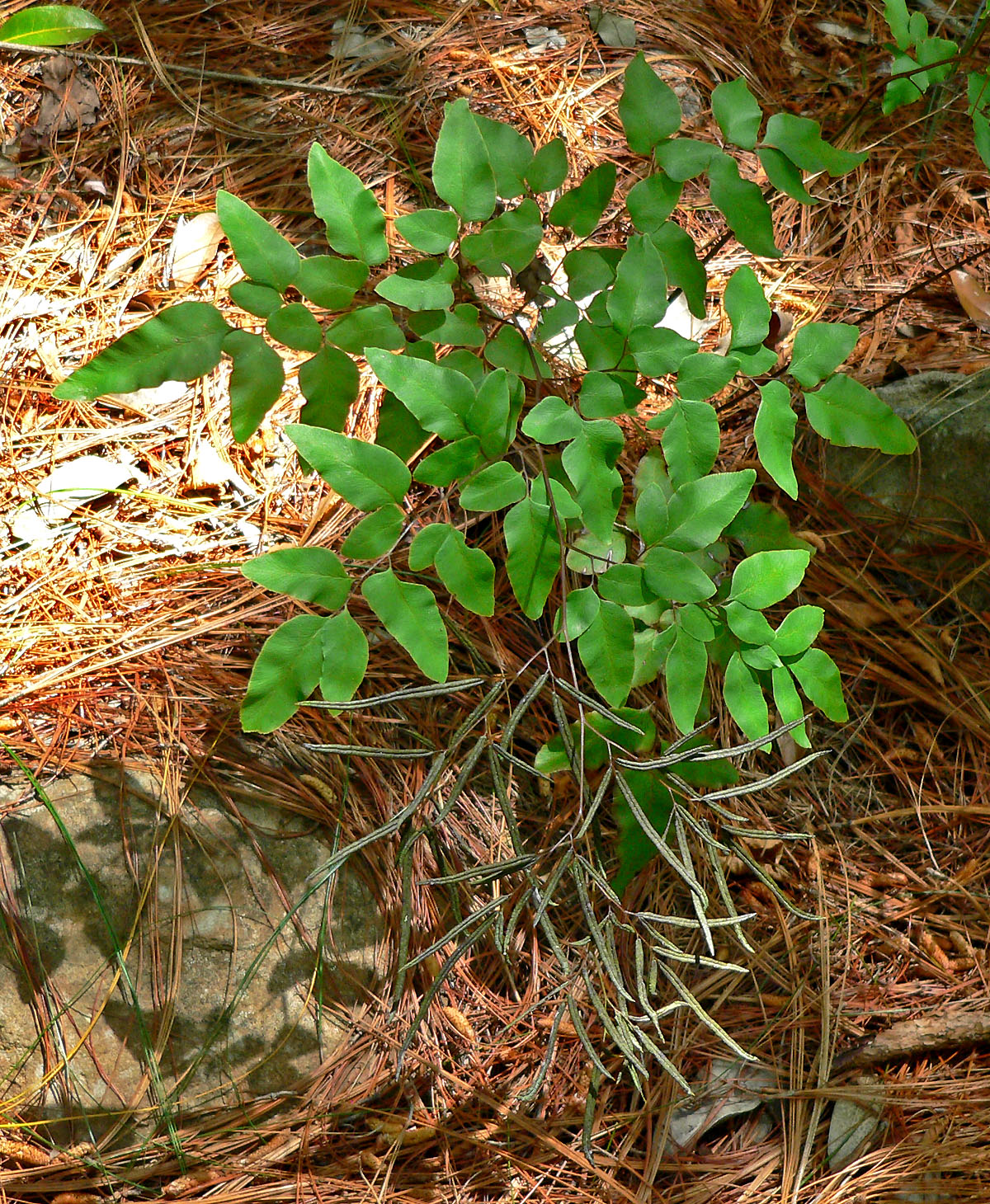

Scientific classification
- Kingdom: Plantae
- Clade: Tracheophytes
- Division: Polypodiophyta
- Class: Polypodiopsida
- Order: Polypodiales
- Family: Pteridaceae
- Genus: Llavea; Lag.
- Species: L. cordifolia

Binomial name
- Llavea cordifolia Lag.

Synonyms
- Botryogramme Fée 1852; Ceratodactylis Smith 1839 ex Hooker 1840

= Llavea =

Genus of ferns

Llavea is a monotypic genus of fern in the family Pteridaceae. The sole species is Llavea cordifolia. It is often cultivated as an ornamental foliage plant. The genus was named in honour of Pablo de La Llave, a Mexican naturalist.

Recent cladistic studies have shown that this genus forms a natural group with Cryptogramma and Coniogramme, a group that is sister to all the other pteridoid ferns. This group has been published as the Cryptogrammoideae, one of five subfamilies of the Pteridaceae.
