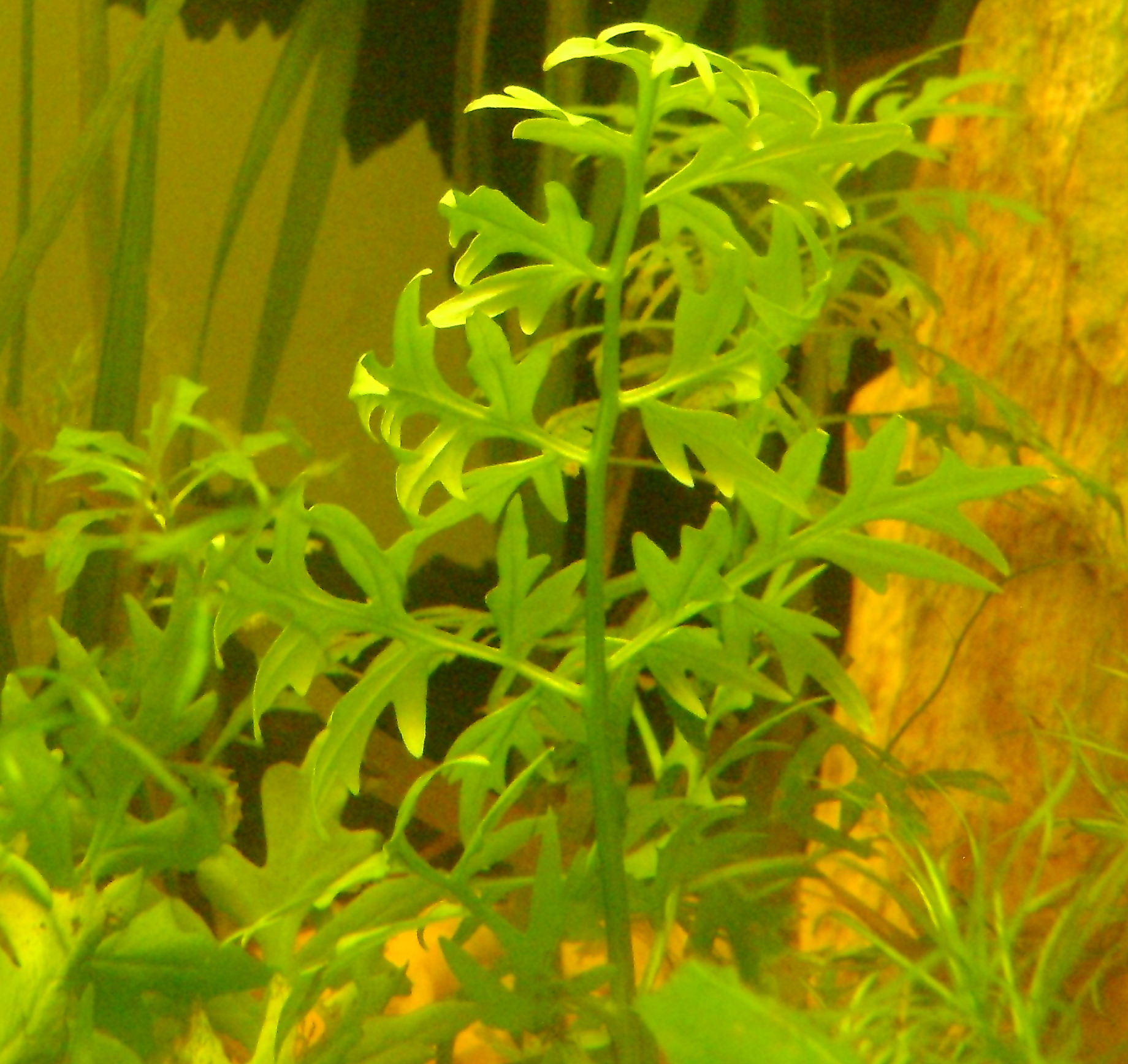
- Ceratopteris cornuta in aquarium

Scientific classification
- Kingdom: Plantae
- Clade: Tracheophytes
- Division: Polypodiophyta
- Class: Polypodiopsida
- Order: Polypodiales
- Family: Pteridaceae
- Subfamily: Parkerioideae
- Genus: Ceratopteris; Brongn.

Type species
- Ceratopteris thalictroides (L.) Brongn.

Species
- See text

Synonyms
- Cryptogenis Richard 1823 ex Brongniart 1823; Ellebocarpus Kaulfuss 1824; Furcaria Desvaux 1827; Parkeria Hooker 1825; Teleozoma Brown 1823

= Ceratopteris =

Genus of aquatic plants

Ceratopteris is the only genus among homosporous ferns that is exclusively aquatic. It is pan-tropical and classified in the Parkerioideae subfamily of the family Pteridaceae.

== Description ==
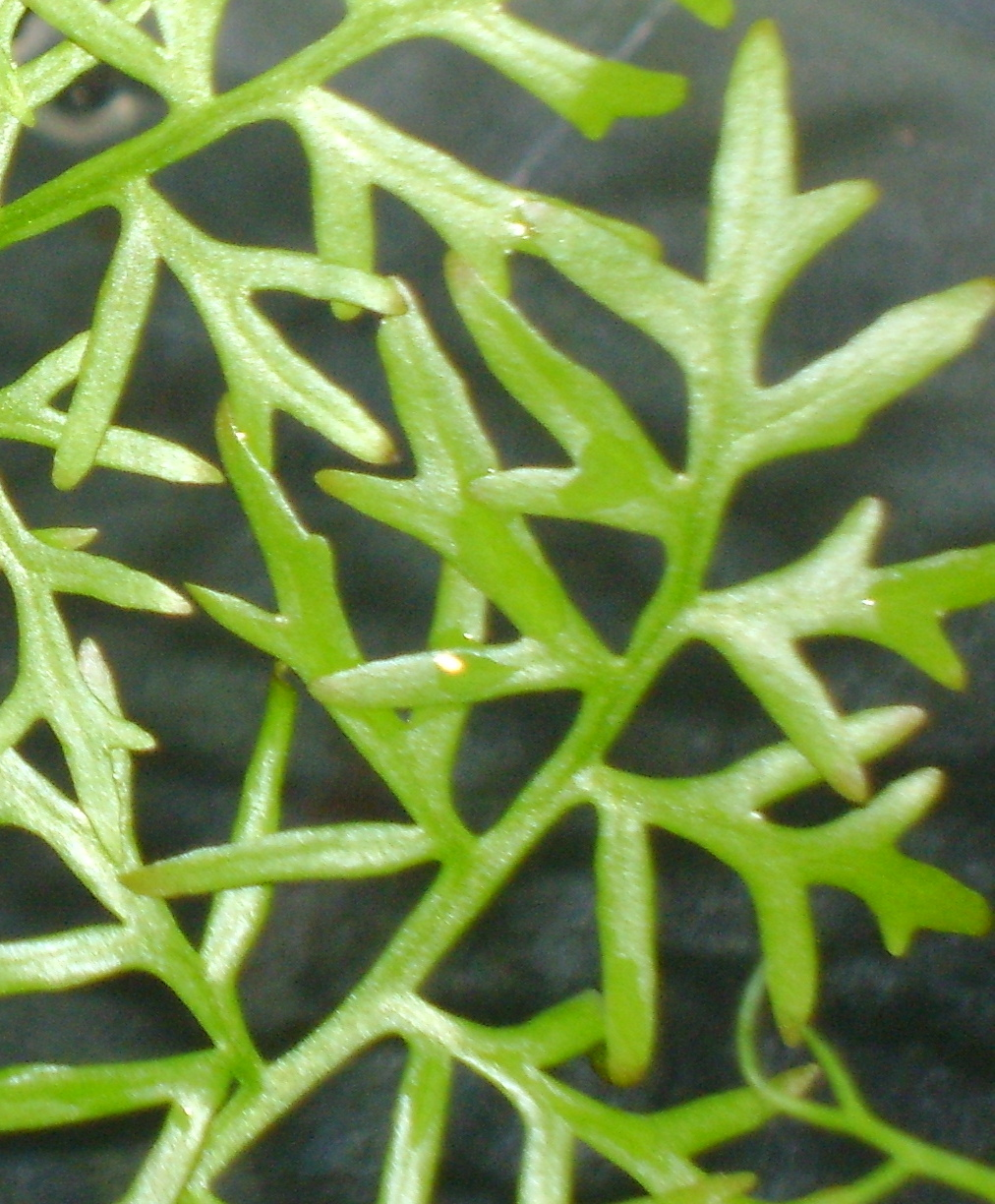
Ceratopteris cornuta in detail

Erect aquatic or subaquatic ferns of moderate size. Rhizome short, fleshy, horizontal and ascending to erect, loosely rooted in the mud or +/- floating, radial, dictyostelic with numerous meristeles and medullary strands, young parts bearing thin, ovate, +/- cordate, clathrate scales. Fronds stipitate, the stipes fleshy, with numerous longitudinal air canals, abaxially rounded and ribbed, adaxially flattened, vascular bundles in a peripheral ring, one with each rib and several to the adaxial side, and several smaller medullary strands; lamina dimorphic, sterile fronds +/- spreading, 2–3-pinnatifid with broad membranous lobes, venation reticulate without included free veinlets, often with proliferous buds in the axils; fertile fronds erect, longer, narrower and more divided than the sterile, the lobes strongly recurved to completely cover the adaxial surface, venation longitudinal, branching at the bases of the lobes. Sporangia solititary, scattered along the veins, exindusiate but protected by the continuous reflexed margin of the lamina, large, short-stalked, annulus broad, irregular, of 30–70 thickened cells, or lacking, containing 16 to 32 spores. Spores large, trilete, ribbed with irregular long meshes.

== Taxonomy ==
Ceratopteris was long placed in the monogeneric family Parkeriaceae, thought to be unique because of its aquatic adaptations. However, recent genetic analysis has shown it to be clearly allied with Acrostichum in the subfamily Parkerioideae, within the family Pteridaceae.

At one time, some authorities recognized only one species; now some authorities recognize only four species. However, recent work by Masuyama and Watano has suggested that C. thalictroides actually consists of four cryptic species (thalictroides, froesii, gaudichaudii, oblongibloba).

=== Phylogeny ===
Phylogeny of Ceratopteris

- Ceratopteris
  - C. richardii Brongn. 1823 ("C-fern"; Triangle waterfern)
  - - C. cornuta (P. Beauv.) Le Prieur 1830
    - - C. chunii Yang 2022
      - - C. chingii Yang & Yu 2022
        - - C. shingii Yan & Zhang 2020
          - - C. pteridoides (Hook.) Hieron. 1905 (Floating antlerfern)
            - C. thalictroides (L.) Brongn. 1821 (Water Sprite, Oriental water fern)

Other species include:
- †C. duabensis Kolakovsky 1956
- C. oblongiloba Masuyama & Watano 2010

== Distribution and habitat ==
This widespread genus of four to six species inhabits the humid tropics.

Ceratopteris is also important in the study of pteridophytes and is a commonly used model organism for use in genomic studies, due to the ease and rapidity with which it can be grown in laboratories, as well as having well-characterized phenotypes. Patented strains of this plant have been developed.

== Outcrossing and self-fertilization ==
A gametophyte is one of the two alternating multicellular phases of the fern life cycle. The gametophyte is haploid. The other stage is the diploid sporophyte. A gametophyte is a multicellular organism that develops from a haploid spore (that has one set of chromosomes). Ceratopteris thalictroides has two types of gametophytes with different sexual expression: these types are hermaphrodite and male. Hermaphroditic gametophytes have one or several archegonia and a few antheridia. Archegonia are multicellular structures of the gametophyte that produce and contain the ovum or female gamete. The corresponding male organ is the antheridium, a haploid organ producing and containing sperm. The second of the two types of gametophyte are male that produce only antheridia.

When Ceratopteris richardii ferns are grown alone they develop into hermaphrodites (with mainly female archegonia). However, plants that grow near established genetically identical individuals develop into males. The hermaphrodite secretes a pheromone (antheridiogen) that tells others nearby to be male. Thus when plants are near each other outcrossing is promoted. Self-fertilization predominates when there is no nearby partner.

== Toxicity ==
The plants may have carcinogenic properties.

== Uses ==
Ceratopteris is a fairly popular aquarium plant, often sold under the name "water sprite." It may be grown as an emersed but natant (floating) plant, or as an immersed plant rooted in the substrate. Under the right conditions the plants will grow fully emerse erect leaves. Under a bright light the plants can grow fast, and be used to help cycle an aquarium.

This plant is often used as a vegetable, particularly in Asia.
