= Allosorus gracilis =

Allosorus gracilis is the name of a fern species, which may refer to:

- Allosorus gracilis (Michx.) C.Presl, combined in 1836, now known as Cryptogramma stelleri
- Allosorus gracilis (Fée) Farw., combined in 1920, an illegitimate later homonym, now known as Myriopteris gracilis
