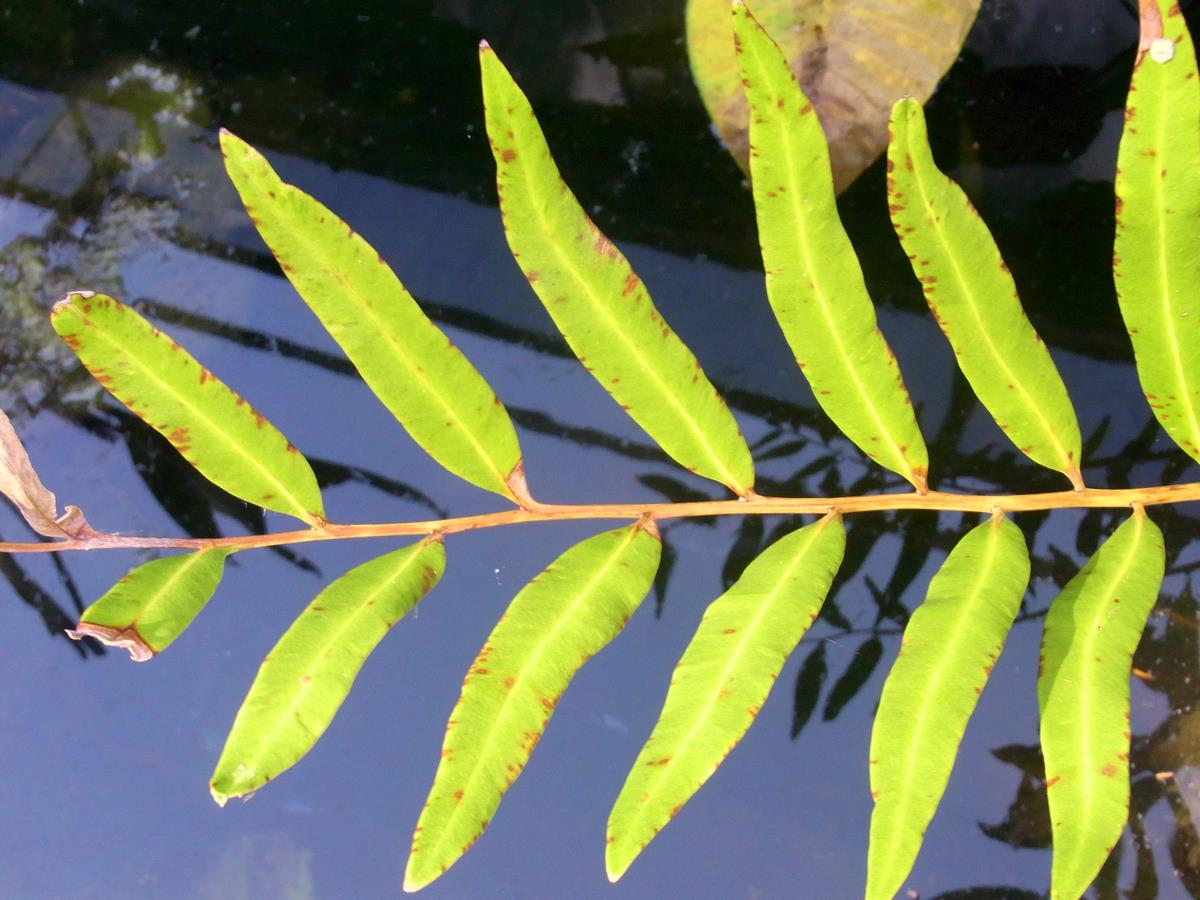
- Royal Botanic Gardens, Sydney

Scientific classification
- Kingdom: Plantae
- Clade: Tracheophytes
- Division: Polypodiophyta
- Class: Polypodiopsida
- Order: Polypodiales
- Family: Pteridaceae
- Genus: Acrostichum
- Species: A. speciosum

Binomial name
- Acrostichum speciosum Willd.

= Acrostichum speciosum =

Mangrove fern

Species of fern

Acrostichum speciosum, the mangrove fern is a widespread plant found in Asia, Madagascar and Australia. A clumping plant to 1.5 metres tall with reddish/brown fertile fronds and pointed leaf tips. It is found as far south as New South Wales. It may be seen on coastal cliffs, but is usually seen in tidal flats, brackish swamps and with mangroves.

The specific epithet speciosum refers to the attractive form of the plant. It first appeared in scientific literature in the year 1810, published in the Species Plantarum by Carl Ludwig Willdenow. It is now placed in the Parkerioideae subfamily of the family Pteridaceae.
