= Rock brake =

Rock brake is a common name for several ferns which grow in rocky areas and may refer to:

- Cryptogramma
- Pellaea (plant)
