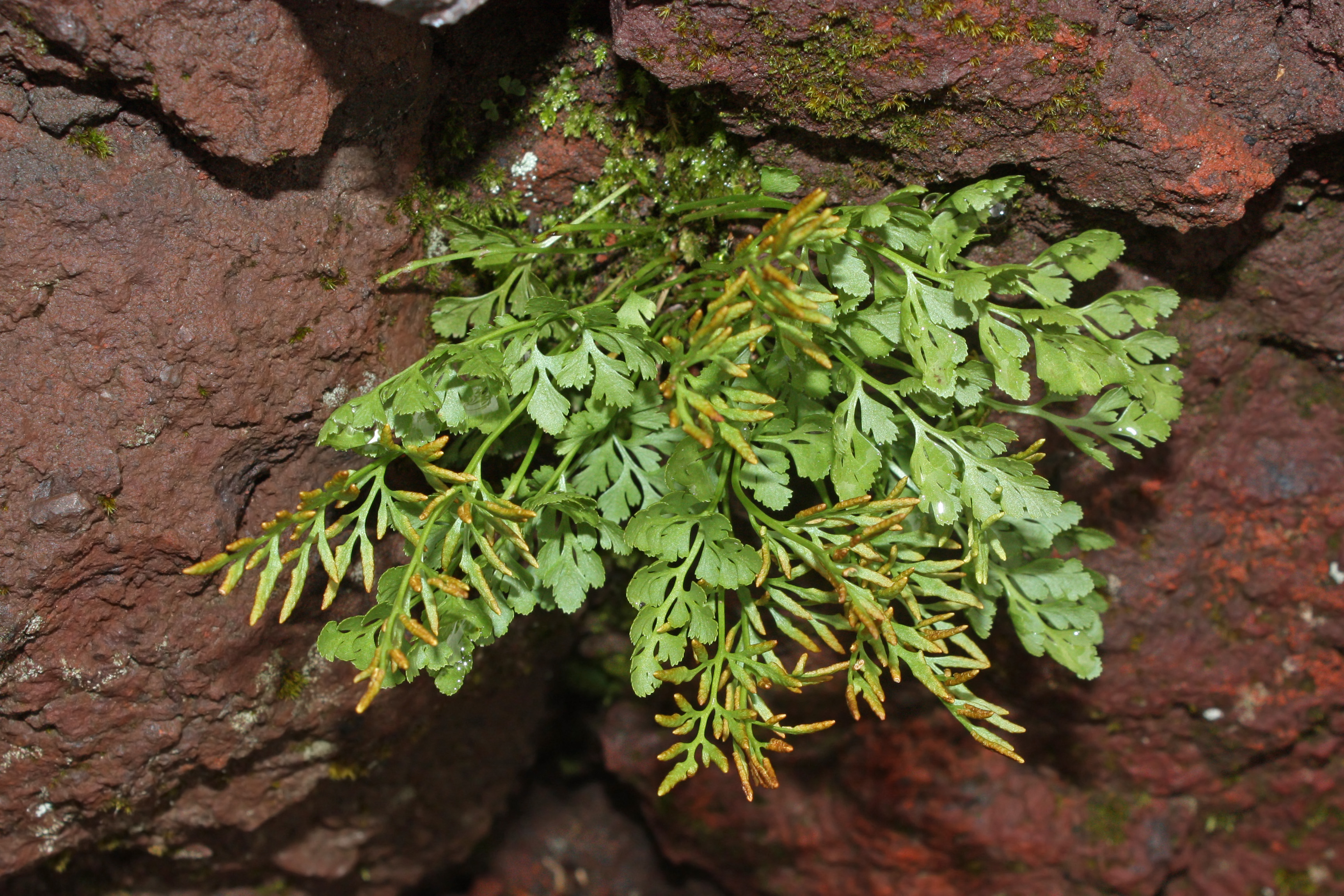

Conservation status
- Secure (NatureServe)

Scientific classification
- Kingdom: Plantae
- Clade: Tracheophytes
- Division: Polypodiophyta
- Class: Polypodiopsida
- Order: Polypodiales
- Family: Pteridaceae
- Genus: Cryptogramma
- Species: C. acrostichoides

Binomial name
- Cryptogramma acrostichoides R.Br.

= Cryptogramma acrostichoides =

Species of fern

Cryptogramma acrostichoides is a fern species in the Cryptogrammoideae subfamily of the Pteridaceae. It is known by the common names American parsley fern and American rockbrake and is native to most of western North America, where it grows in the cracks of rocks in many types of sunny mountainous habitat.

== Description ==
Cryptogramma acrostichoides grows in a single tuft from a short rhizome. There are two leaf types. The sterile leaf has flat, oval-shaped lobed leaflets resembling parsley, and the fertile leaf is longer with narrow, thick, linear leaflets with their margins curled under to cover the sporangia on the undersides. The fertile leaves typically project well above the sterile leaves. Some plants die back completely toward the end of a dry period while others remain green over winter and die back in the spring. In both cases, the leaves are not shed and the following growth season they are usually apparent as a tuft of dead leaves, in contrast to its close relative Cryptogramma cascadensis, which is deciduous. Hydathodes form a pit-like depression near the leaflet edge at the end of each vein, unlike those of Cryptogramma cascadensis, which are shallower and long and narrow. There are sparse short appressed hairs present in the groove on the upper side of the rachis and costae (they are difficult to see without close inspection with a lens).

== Range ==
Cryptogramma acrostichoides is found mostly in the coastal mountain ranges of western North America and in the Rocky Mountains. It ranges from Alaska to California in coastal mountains and the Cascade Mountains and Sierra Nevada, and from southeastern British Columbia through New Mexico in the Rockies.

== Gallery ==
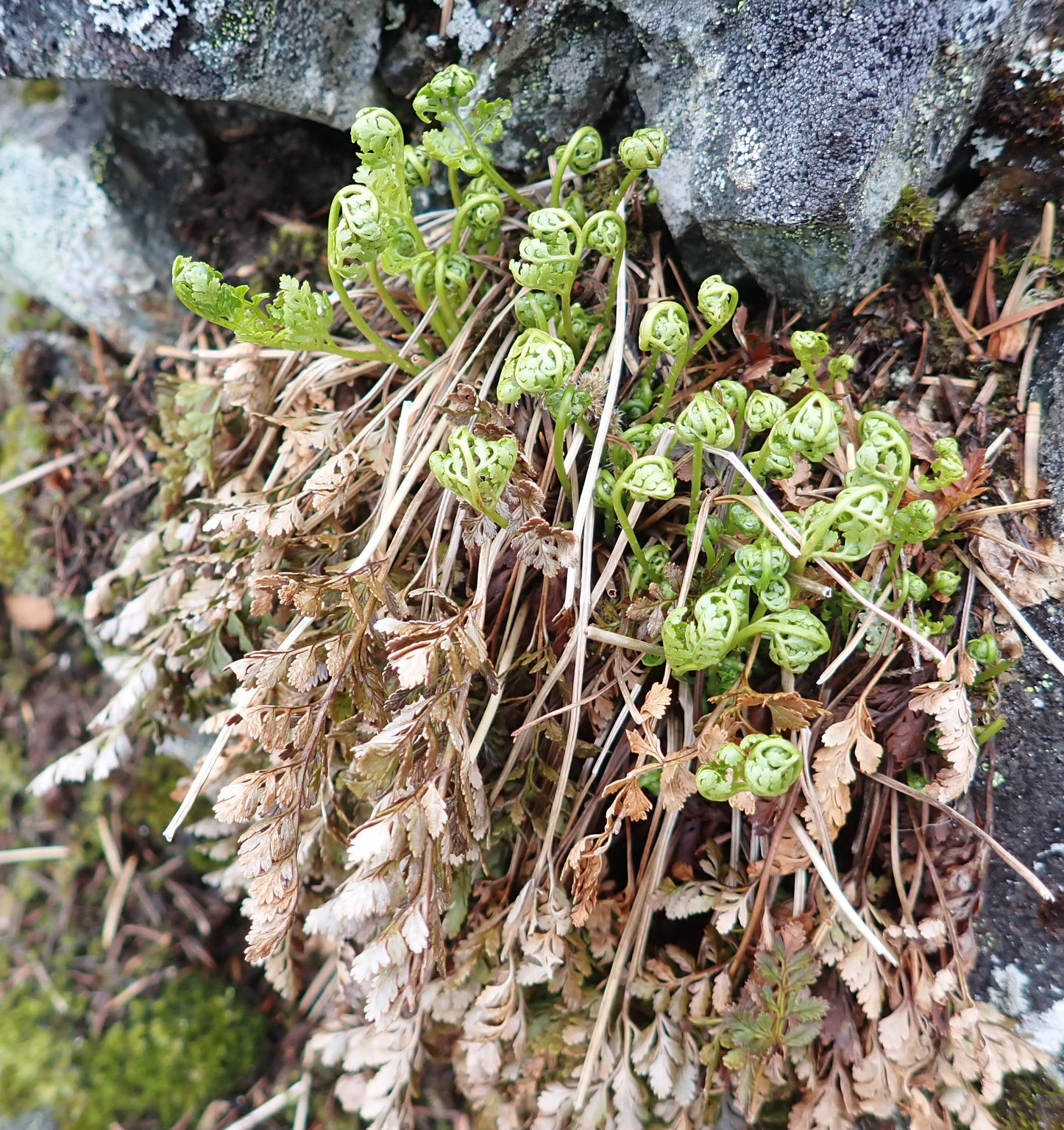
Leafing out in spring

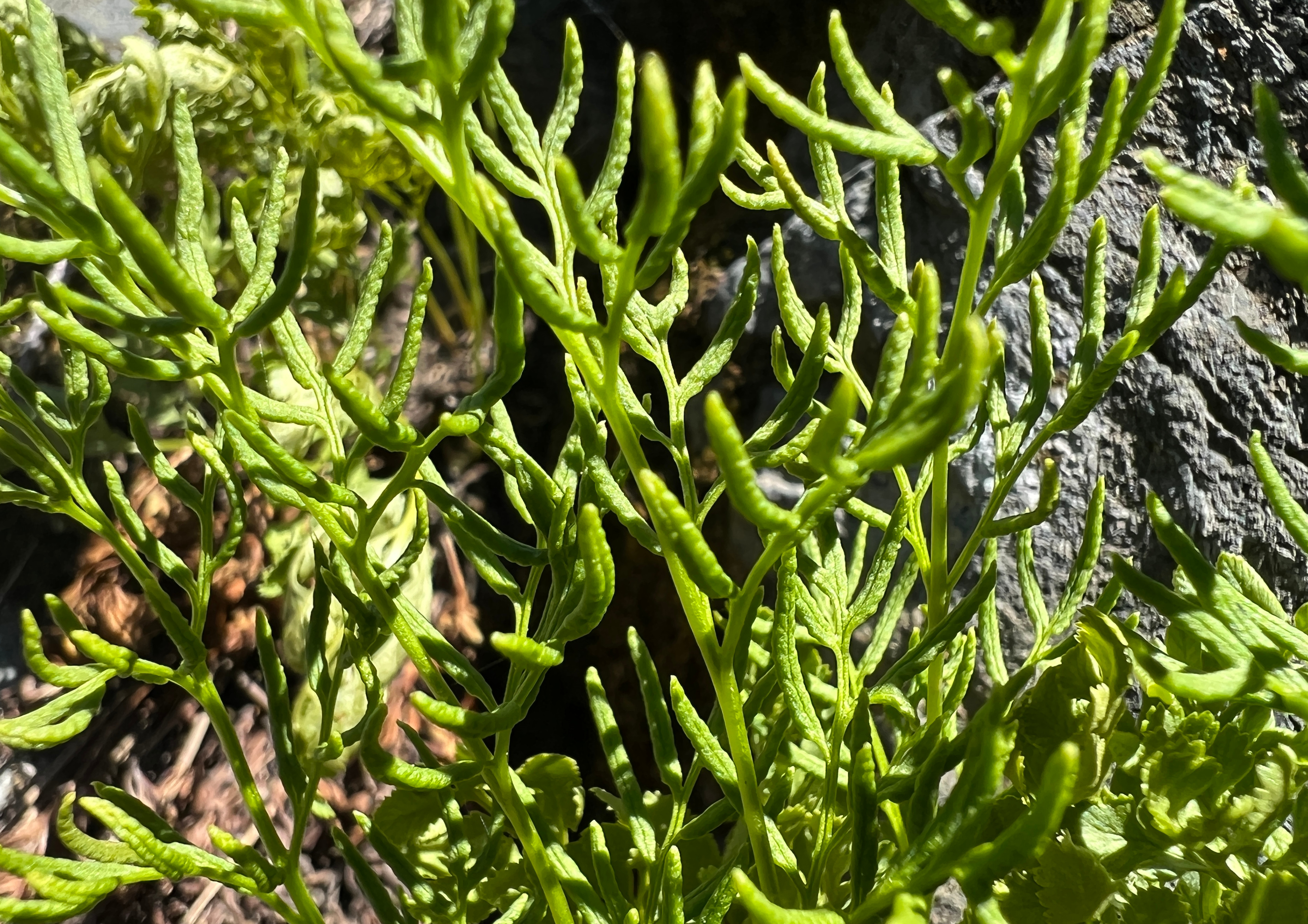
Fertile leaves

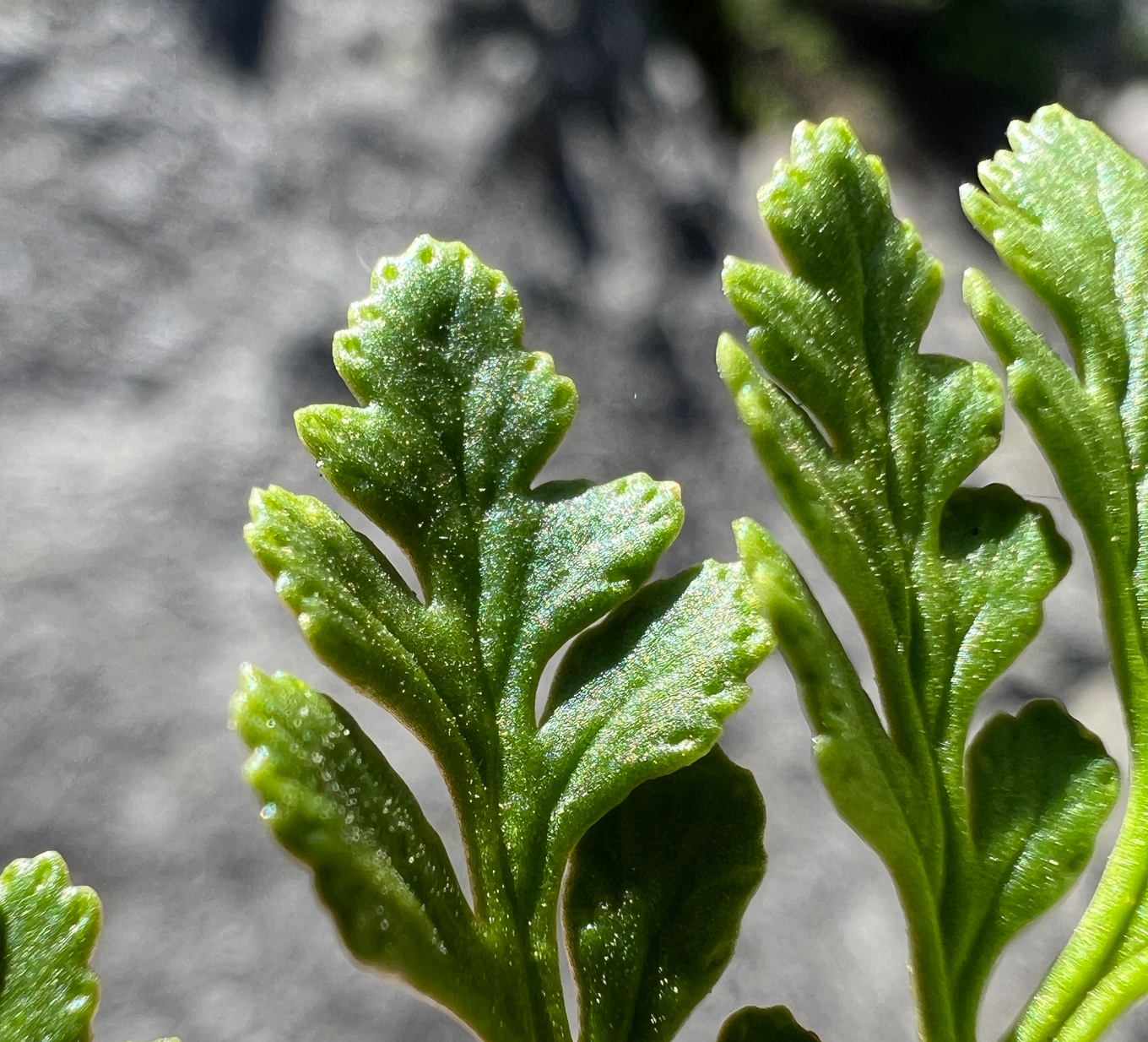
Hydathodes
