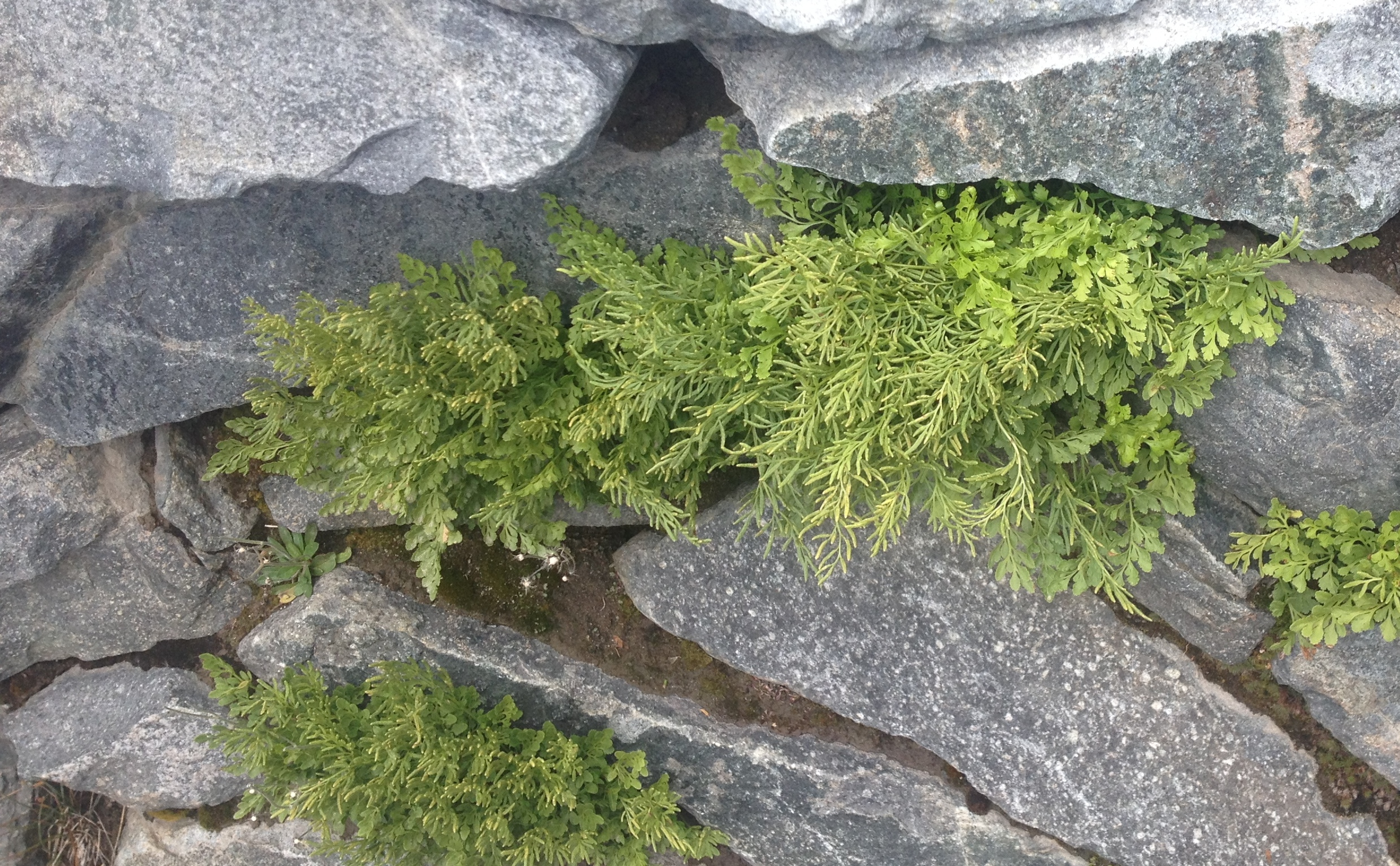
- Cryptogramma cascadensis on a rock wall near Frozen Lake on Mount Rainier, Washington, USA

Conservation status
- Secure (NatureServe)

Scientific classification
- Kingdom: Plantae
- Clade: Tracheophytes
- Division: Polypodiophyta
- Class: Polypodiopsida
- Order: Polypodiales
- Family: Pteridaceae
- Genus: Cryptogramma
- Species: C. cascadensis

Binomial name
- Cryptogramma cascadensis E.R.Alverson

= Cryptogramma cascadensis =

Species of fern

Cryptogramma cascadensis is a species of fern known by the common names Cascade parsley fern and Cascade rockbrake.

== Description ==
The plant forms a clump from a rhizome. It has two types of leaves. The sterile leaf is flat with lobed oval or diamond-shaped leaflets, and the fertile leaf is longer, with narrow, thick, fingerlike leaflets with edges curled under to cover the sporangia on the undersides. The leaves are deciduous. The hydathodes are shallow and linear, unlike the pit-like hydathodes of Cryptogramma acrostichoides.

== Taxonomy ==
Formerly lumped with Cryptogramma acrostichoides, C. cascadensis was described as a distinct species by Ed Alverson in 1989. The type specimen was collected growing on talus below Chair Peak, 5 km (3 mi) northwest of Snoqualmie Pass.

== Distribution and habitat ==
It is native to western North America from British Columbia to Montana to California, where it grows in the cracks and crevices of mountain talus slopes, especially in moist subalpine areas on volcanic or granite rocks.

== Gallery ==
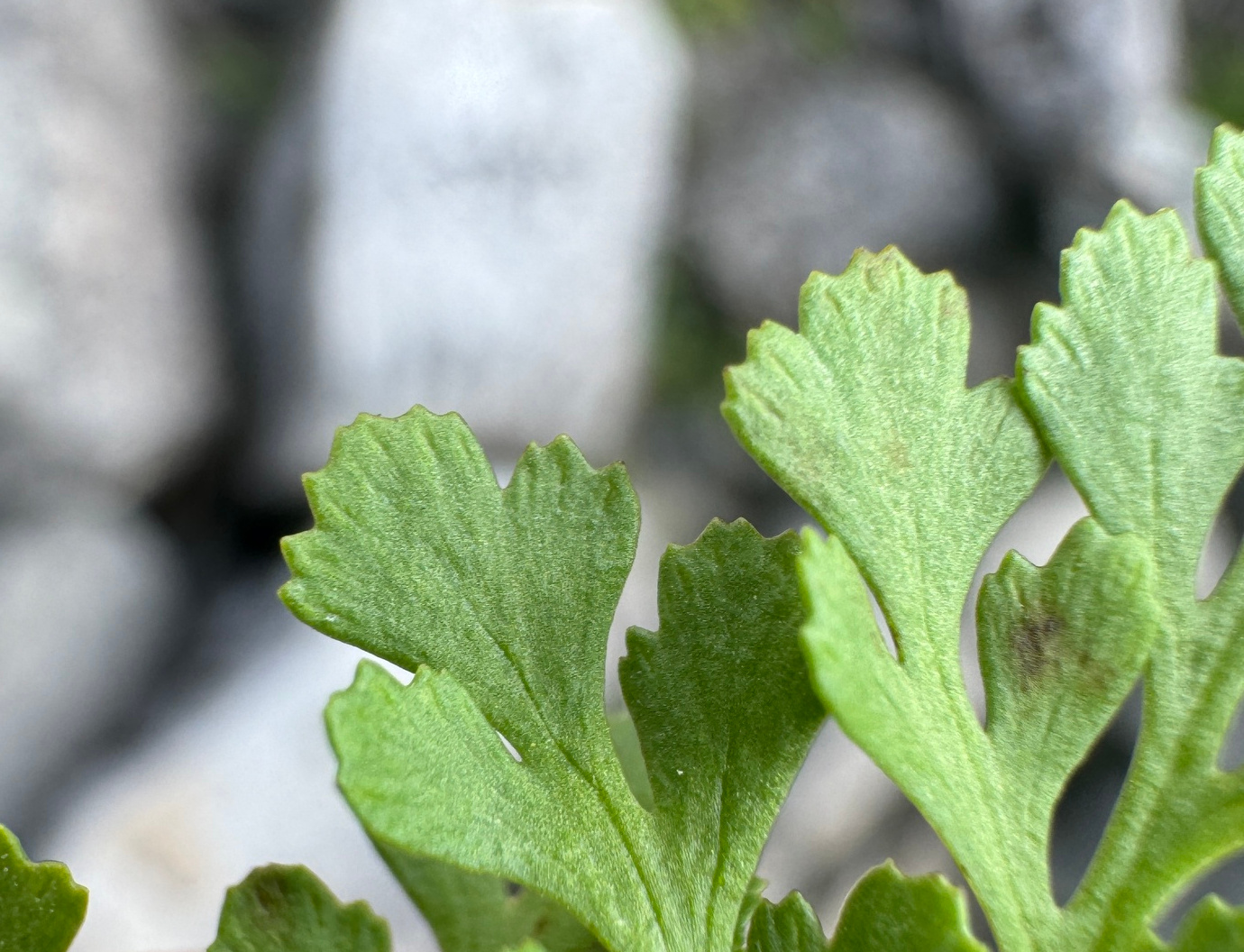
Hydathodes
