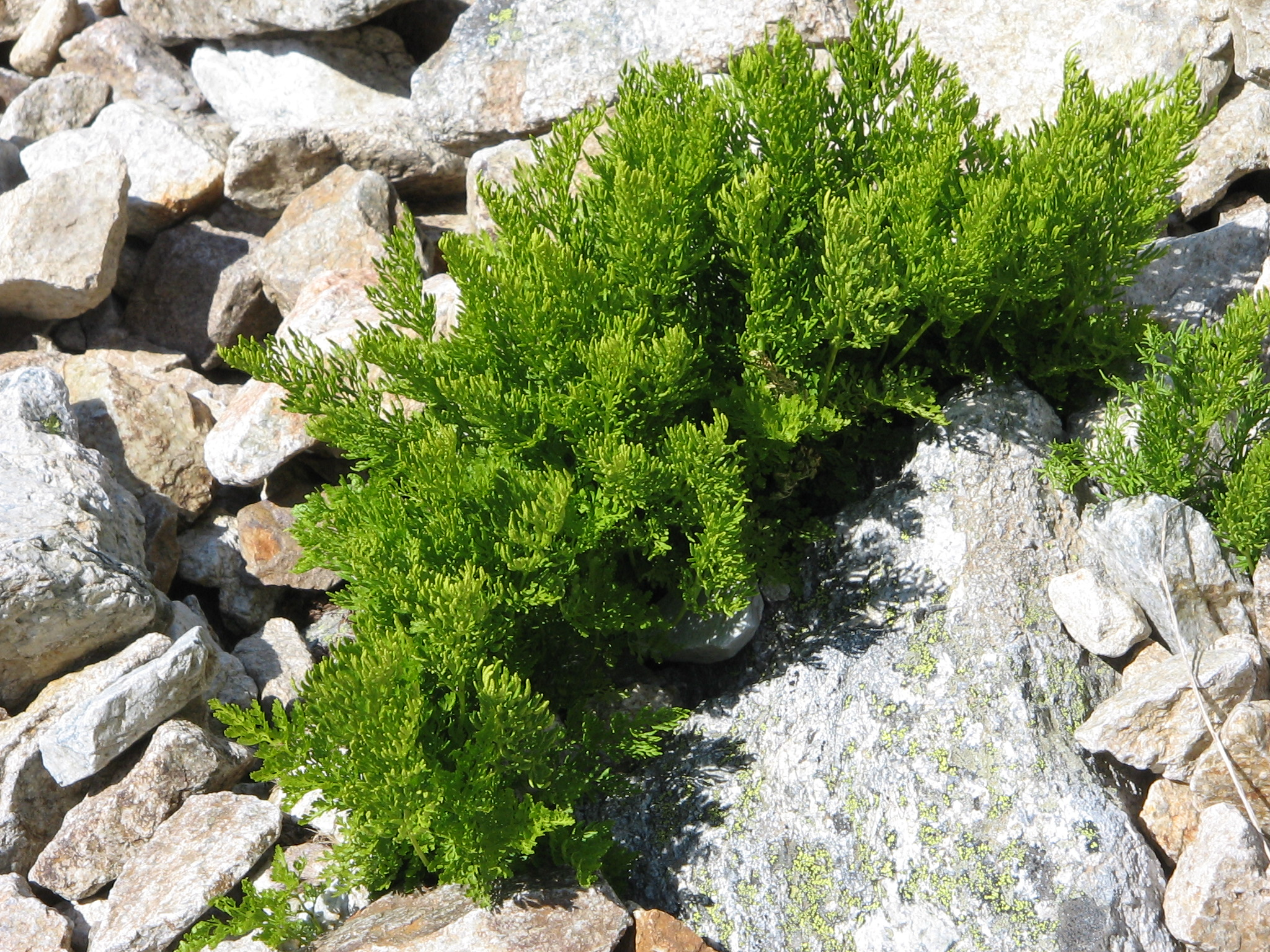
- Cryptogramma crispa

Scientific classification
- Kingdom: Plantae
- Clade: Tracheophytes
- Division: Polypodiophyta
- Class: Polypodiopsida
- Order: Polypodiales
- Family: Pteridaceae
- Subfamily: Cryptogrammoideae; S.Linds.

Genera
- Coniogramme Fée; Cryptogramma R.Br.; Llavea Lag.

Synonyms
- Cryptogrammaceae Pic. Serm.

= Cryptogrammoideae =

Subfamily of ferns

Cryptogrammoideae is a subfamily of ferns in the family Pteridaceae. The subfamily contains three genera and about 23 species.

== Taxonomy ==
In the Pteridophyte Phylogeny Group classification of 2016 (PPG I), Cryptogrammoideae is one of the five subfamilies of the family Pteridaceae. Although the subfamily Cryptogrammoideae is similar to the family Cryptogrammaceae proposed by Pichi Sermolli in 1963, that group contained the morphologically similar genus Onychium (now in the subfamily Pteridoideae) instead of the less morphologically similar genus Coniogramme. In 2006, Smith et al. included Cryptogrammaceae as part of the family Pteridaceae, and in 2011, Christenhusz et al. listed its three genera in Cryptogrammoideae, one of five subfamilies of Pteridaceae, a placement used in PPG I.

The following diagram shows a likely phylogenic relationship between the three Cryptogrammoideae genera and the other Pteridaceae subfamilies.

- Pteridaceae
  - Cryptogrammoideae
    - Llavea
    - - Coniogramme
      - Cryptogramma
  - - - Parkerioideae (syn. Ceratopteridoideae)
      - Pteridoideae
    - - Cheilanthoideae
      - Vittarioideae
