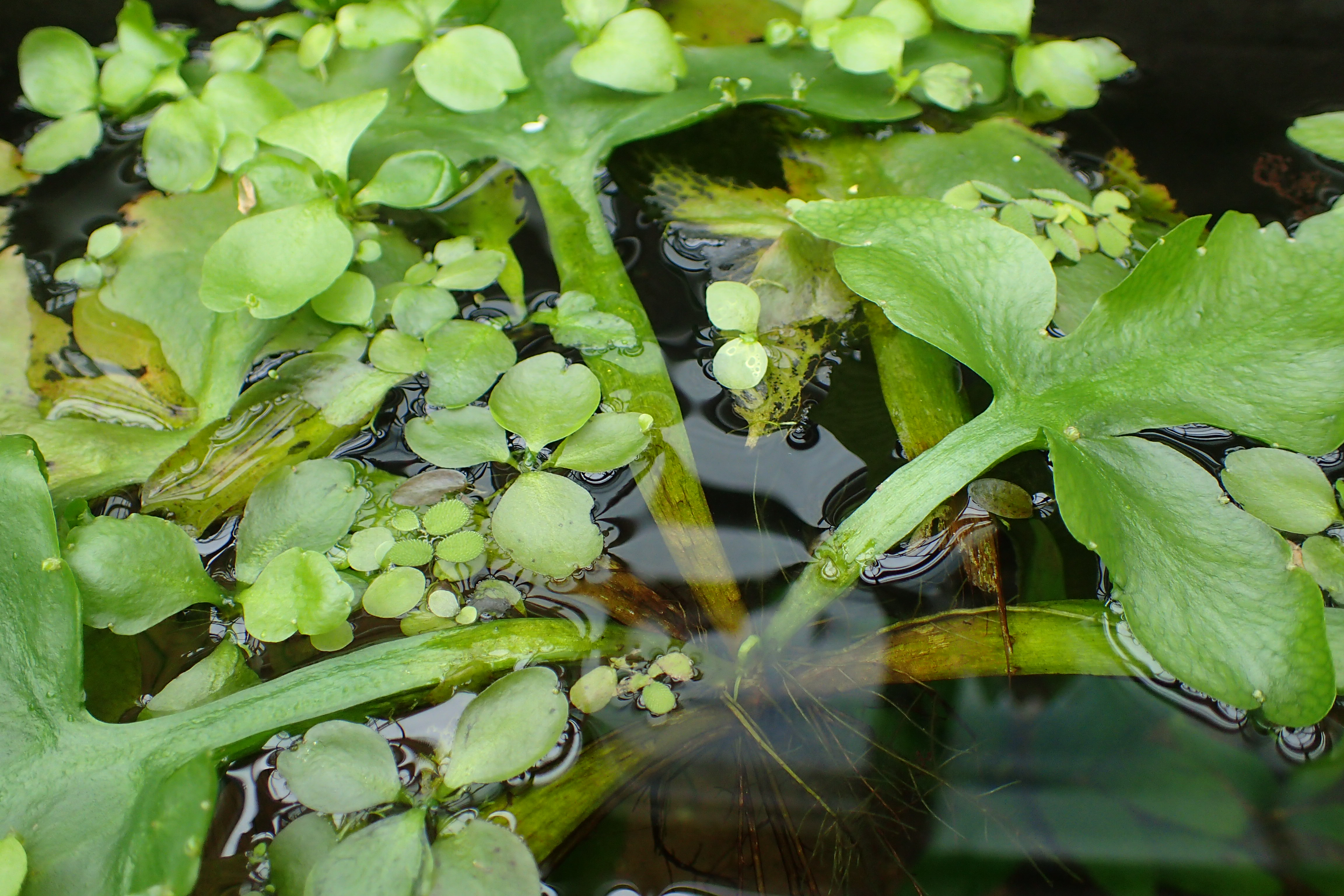
- At the University of Wrocław Botanical Garden
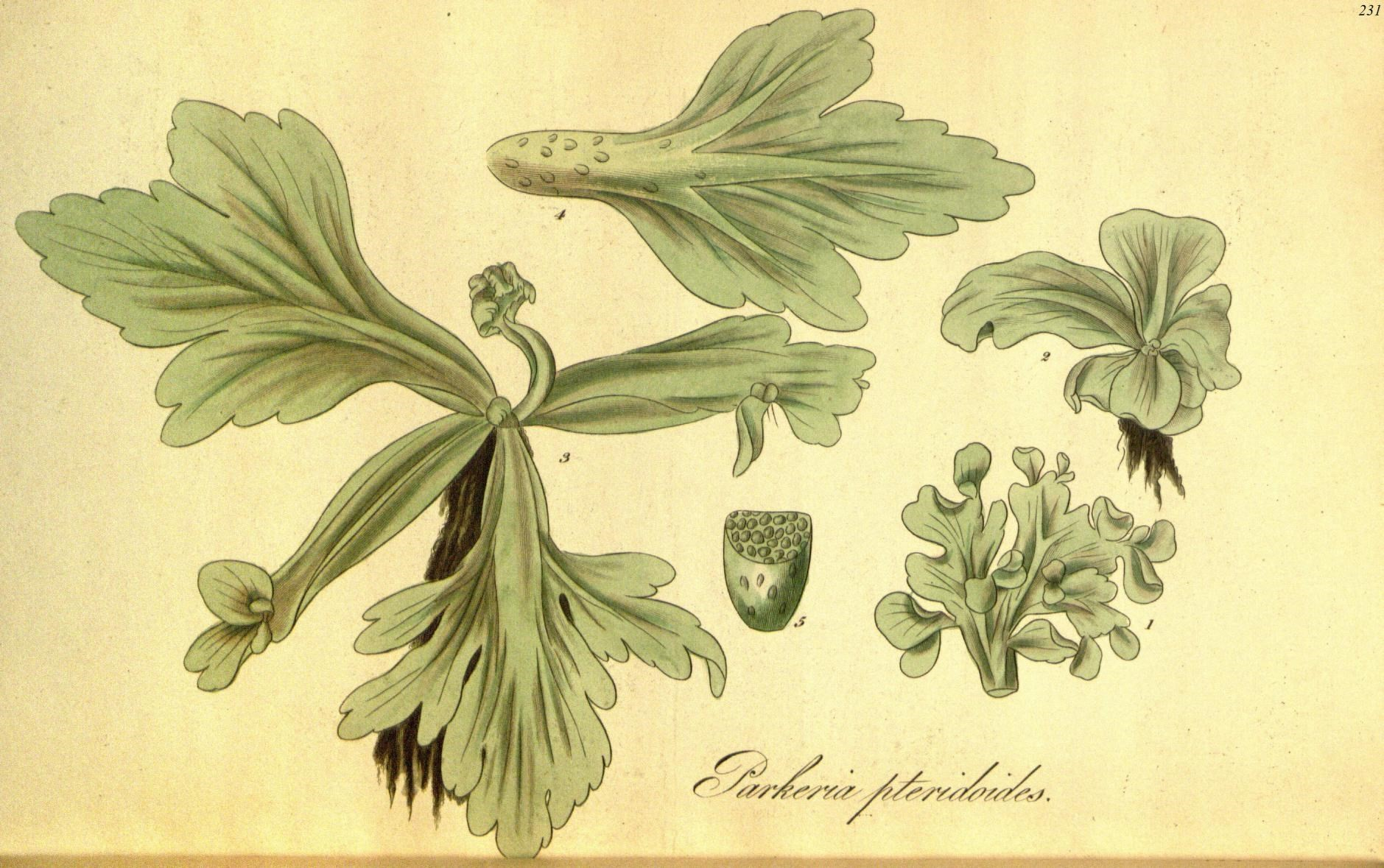
- Botanical illustration

Scientific classification
- Kingdom: Plantae
- Clade: Tracheophytes
- Division: Polypodiophyta
- Class: Polypodiopsida
- Order: Polypodiales
- Family: Pteridaceae
- Genus: Ceratopteris
- Species: C. pteridoides

Binomial name
- Ceratopteris pteridoides (Hook.) Hieron.

Synonyms
- Ceratopteris lockhartii (Hook. & Grev.) Kunze; Ceratopteris parkeri J.Sm.; Parkeria lockhartii Hook. & Grev.; Parkeria pteridoides Hook.

= Ceratopteris pteridoides =

Species of plant

Ceratopteris pteridoides, the floating antler-fern, is a species of aquatic fern in the family Pteridaceae. It is native to the subtropical and tropical New World, the Indian Subcontinent, central and eastern China, and Vietnam. A short-lived perennial, it can reach 4 ft (1.2 m) in width.
