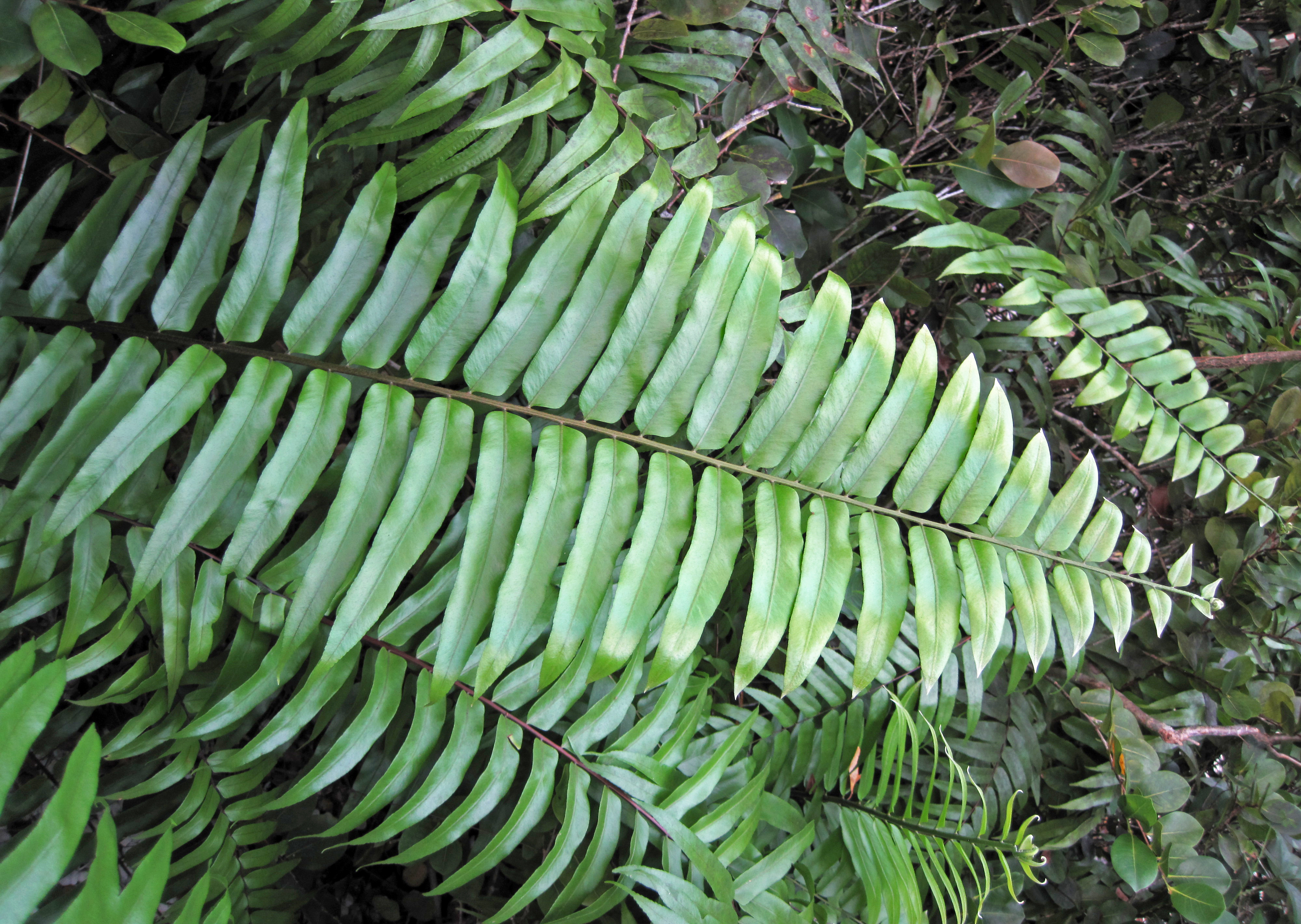
- Picture of a Giant Leather Fern

Scientific classification
- Kingdom: Plantae
- Clade: Tracheophytes
- Division: Polypodiophyta
- Class: Polypodiopsida
- Order: Polypodiales
- Family: Pteridaceae
- Genus: Acrostichum
- Species: A. danaeifolium

Binomial name
- Acrostichum danaeifolium Langsd. & Fisch.

= Acrostichum danaeifolium =

Species of fern

Acrostichum danaeifolium, called helecho mangle, interior leather fern or giant leather fern, is a massive fern in the family Pteridaceae which is found throughout the Neotropics. The fronds are up to 3 m (9.8 ft) long with pinnate leaflets up to 30 cm (12 in) long. Spores are distributed uniformly on the back side of the fronds. It prefers wet soils.
