= Pablo de La Llave =

Mexican politician

Dr. Pablo de la Llave (1773–1833) was a Mexican Catholic priest, politician, and naturalist.

He was born to a wealthy family and grew up in Córdoba, Veracruz. After a brilliant university career, he became a teacher in the national college of St. John Lateran and doctor of theology at what was then the University of Mexico. He was a famous preacher and made some translations from Hebrew. He went to Europe and lived for some time in Paris. After this he became deputy director of the Madrid Museum of Natural History under the Bonapartist kingdom. In 1811 and 1812 he assisted José Mariano Mociño in organizing the collections of the Nueva España Expedition (1787–1803) to survey the natural history of Mexico. In 1820 and 1821 he represented the state of Veracruz in the Spanish legislature, where he was a liberal.

On his return to Mexico after it declared independence, he held church positions including treasurer of the church at Morelia (then called Valladolid), Michoacán. By 1823 he was Minister of Justice and of Church Matters in the imperial administration of Agustín de Iturbide. In 1824, the first president of Mexico, Guadalupe Victoria, named him to the new cabinet. He also held the office of senator for Veracruz. Politically, Llave has been considered a liberal and an obedient follower of the republican priest and politician Miguel Ramos Arizpe.

In biology, he and his collaborator Juan José Martínez de Lejarza es:Juan José Martinez de Lexarza (or Lexarza) were the first to systematically study the orchids of Michoacán. In 1824 they published a work describing about 50 species. He was elected to the American Philosophical Society in 1826.

In 1831 La Llave was designated to direct the National Museum of Natural History of Mexico. In 1832 and 1833 he published ornithological papers in a short-lived Mexican journal in which he described and named several birds, of which the rufous-tailed hummingbird and the much more famous resplendent quetzal were new to science. Because of the obscurity of the journal, he did not receive credit for a few decades, and some sources incorrectly give the date of the paper as 1871, possibly the date of a republication.

Llave died in Córdoba in July, 1833. General Ignacio de la Llave was a nephew of his. The fern genus Llavea was named in his honour.
