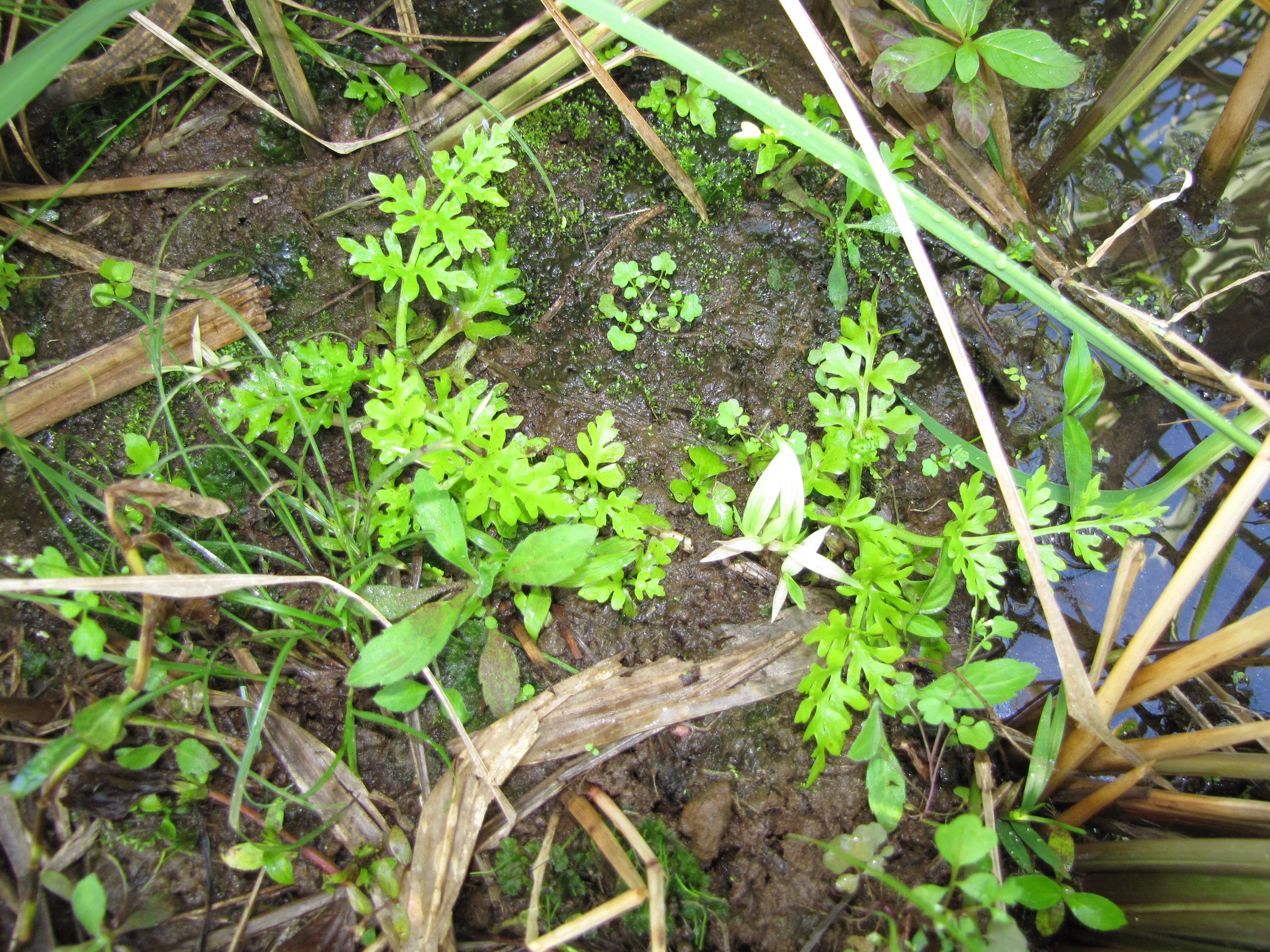
- Ceratopteris thalictroides, showing typical above-water foliage
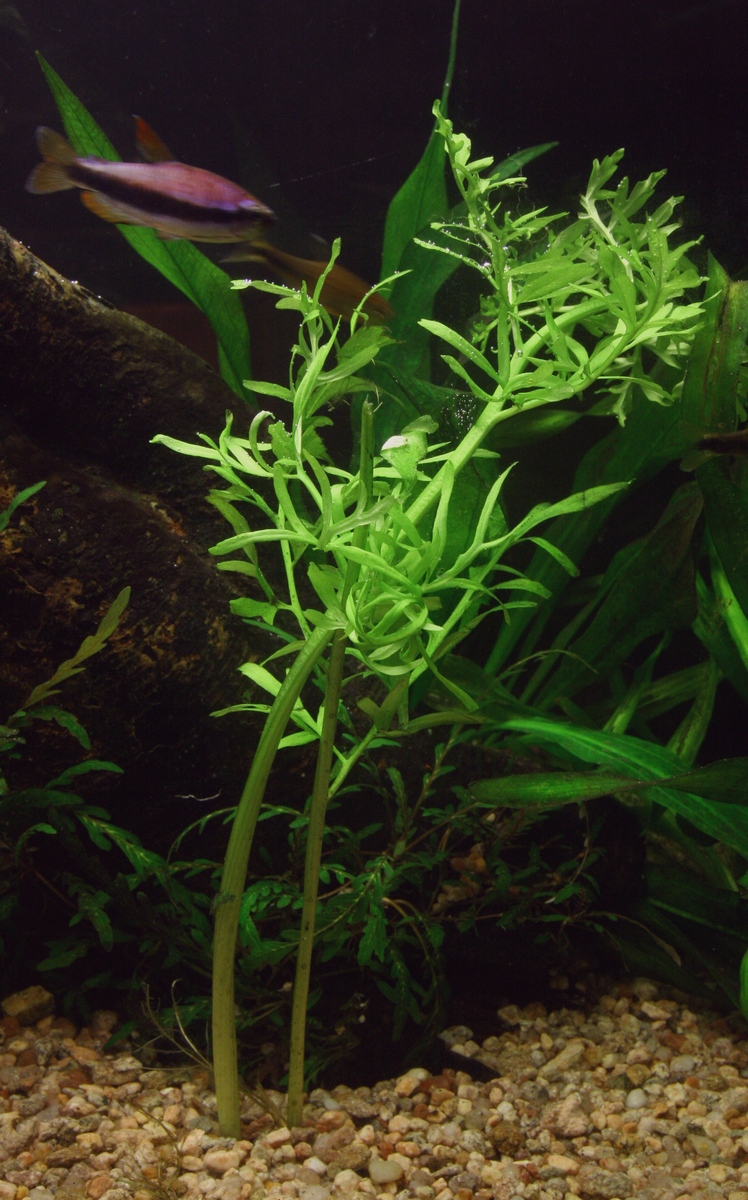
- Ceratopteris thalictroides in an aquarium, showing needle-like submerged foliage

Conservation status
- Least Concern (IUCN 3.1)

Scientific classification
- Kingdom: Plantae
- Clade: Tracheophytes
- Division: Polypodiophyta
- Class: Polypodiopsida
- Order: Polypodiales
- Family: Pteridaceae
- Genus: Ceratopteris
- Species: C. thalictroides

Binomial name
- Ceratopteris thalictroides (L.) Brongn.

= Ceratopteris thalictroides =

Species of aquatic plant

Ceratopteris thalictroides is a fern species belonging to the genus Ceratopteris, one of only two genera of the subfamily Parkerioideae of the family Pteridaceae.

== Common names ==
Ceratopteris thalictroides is commonly known as water sprite, Indian fern, water fern, oriental waterfern, and water hornfern. In the Philippines, it is called pakung-sungay (literally "antler fern" or "horn fern").

== Distribution ==
Ceratopteris thalictroides is widespread across the tropical and subtropical regions of the world, occurring as far north as Korea and as far south as western Australia.

== Description ==
Rooted in mud, Ceratopteris thalictroides plants vary in size and appearance. The stipes of mature plants are 3–15 mm in diameter, spongy, and air-filled with 4–60 centimeters (1.6–23.6 in) long including its stipe.

Pale green, brown when matured, fertile fronds are 15–100 centimeters (5.9–39.4 in) or more, including the stipe, to 40 centimeters (16 in) long. Proliferous or dormant buds with their overlapping dark scales, present in the axils of fertile pinnae, are winged. Pinnae are deeply incised with segments 2–15 mm x 10–30 mm and the fertile segments 1–2 mm x 10–80 mm.

== Cytology ==
In the north type and the third type, the count of chromosomes is 2n=126 while in the south type its 2n=154, making it separate from species.

== Ecology ==
Ceratopteris thalictroides is often found near stagnant water or in still pockets along slow flowing rivers in swampy areas, swamp forests, sago swamps, marshes, natural and man-made ponds. The plant thrives in full sun to moderate shade, from sea level to 1,300 meters (4,300 ft) altitude, but mostly below 500 meters (1,600 ft). C. thalictroides is often massed on or around logs or other floating vegetation. The plant was once recorded in a fresh-water mangrove (Sonneratia) growing among the finger-like pneumatophores. In some areas, Ceratopteris exhibits a degree of seasonality, reaching maturity and shedding spores during the dry season; plants have lost nearly all sterile fronds by this stage. The species has been reported to be functionally an annual, repopulating from spores the next season, but it is of indefinite lifespan in cultivation. It can reach full maturity in 29 days.

== Uses ==
=== Culinary ===
The fronds are cooked and eaten as a vegetable in Madagascar and Swaziland, New Guinea, Nepal, and Vietnam, and other parts of Asia. It has been used similarly to watercress. In Malaysia and Japan, uncurled fronds have been used in salads. Some ferns are potentially carcinogenic when eaten; this may be the case in Ceratopteris thalictroides.

=== Other ===
C. thalictroides is widely used as an aquarium plant, and is prized for its versatility, being used both as a floating plant and a plant that can be rooted in the substrate.

The plant can be used as green manure for rice.

C. thalictroides is used medicinally as a poultice for dermatological issues in Malaysia and the Philippines. In China, it's applied to wounds to stop bleeding.

In the Sepik region of New Guinea, fronds are used as a personal decoration.

== Cultivation ==
It grows best in soil with a pH reading of 5-9 and in very high amounts of light. It usually grows quickly.

C. thalictroides can benefit (like all aquatic plants) from the addition of CO_{2}. The plant's reproductive technique is similar to other ferns. Small adventitious plantlets are grown on the mother plant and are then released when ready.

It can provide useful shade to shyer fish and small fry. The dense roots are said to take nutrients out of the water, helping to prevent the growth of algae.

== See also ==
- Diplazium esculentum
