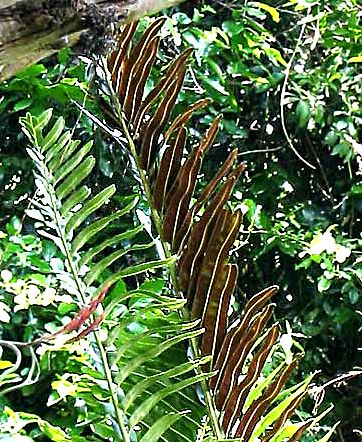
- Acrostichum aureum, showing sori
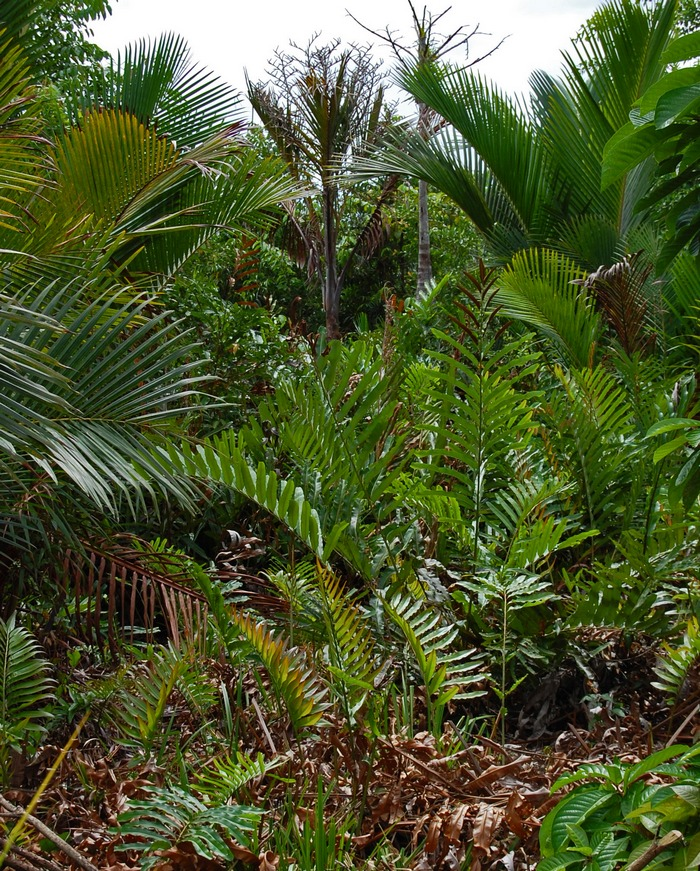
- A. aureum growing in Indonesia

Scientific classification
- Kingdom: Plantae
- Clade: Tracheophytes
- Division: Polypodiophyta
- Class: Polypodiopsida
- Order: Polypodiales
- Family: Pteridaceae
- Subfamily: Parkerioideae
- Genus: Acrostichum; L.

Type species
- Acrostichum aureum L.

Species
- A. aureum; A. danaeifolium; A. speciosum

Synonyms
- Chrysodium Fée

= Acrostichum =

Leather ferns Temporal range: Maastrichtian to Present

Genus of ferns

Acrostichum is a fern genus in the Parkerioideae subfamily of the Pteridaceae. It was one of the original pteridophyte genera delineated by Linnaeus. It was originally drawn very broadly, including all ferns that had sori apparently "acrostichoid", or distributed in a uniform mass across the back of the frond, rather than organized in discrete sori. This led Linnaeus to include such species as Asplenium platyneuron in the genus, because the specimen he received had sori so crowded that it appeared acrostichoid.

Since Acrostichum aureum is regarded as the type for the genus, it is now narrowly circumscribed only to the natural genus of three species that are allied to the genus Ceratopteris. They are collectively known as the leather ferns or leather swamp ferns, genus members commonly being found in swamps. The species of Acrostichum are massive ferns, with fronds up to 3.7 m (12 ft) tall, that depend on a semi-aquatic existence. They do not withstand prolonged immersion, but require wet roots. The species Acrostichum aureum is known to have a high saltwater tolerance, growing in mangroves.

== Phylogeny ==
Phylogeny of Acrostichum

- Acrostichum
  - A. danaeifolium Langsd. & Fisch. (Inland leather fern)
  - - A. aureum L. (Coast/golden leatherfern)
    - A. speciosum Willd. (Mangrove fern)

Other species include:
- †A. affine (Visiani & Massalongo 1854) Gilkinet 1925 non Martens & Galeotti 1842
- †A. hesperium Newberry 1883
- †A. justii Baltakytė-Vienožinskienė 1958
- †A. lanzaeanum (Visiani 1858) Chandler 1962
- †A. longaevum Chlonova 1960
- †A. ochoticum Budantsev 1983
- †A. primordiale von Ettingshausen 1895
- †A. silesiacum Sternberg 1825
- †A. simulatum Knowlton 1900
- †A. touchovicense Knobloch 1964
- †A. ubense Huzioka & Takahashi 1970
