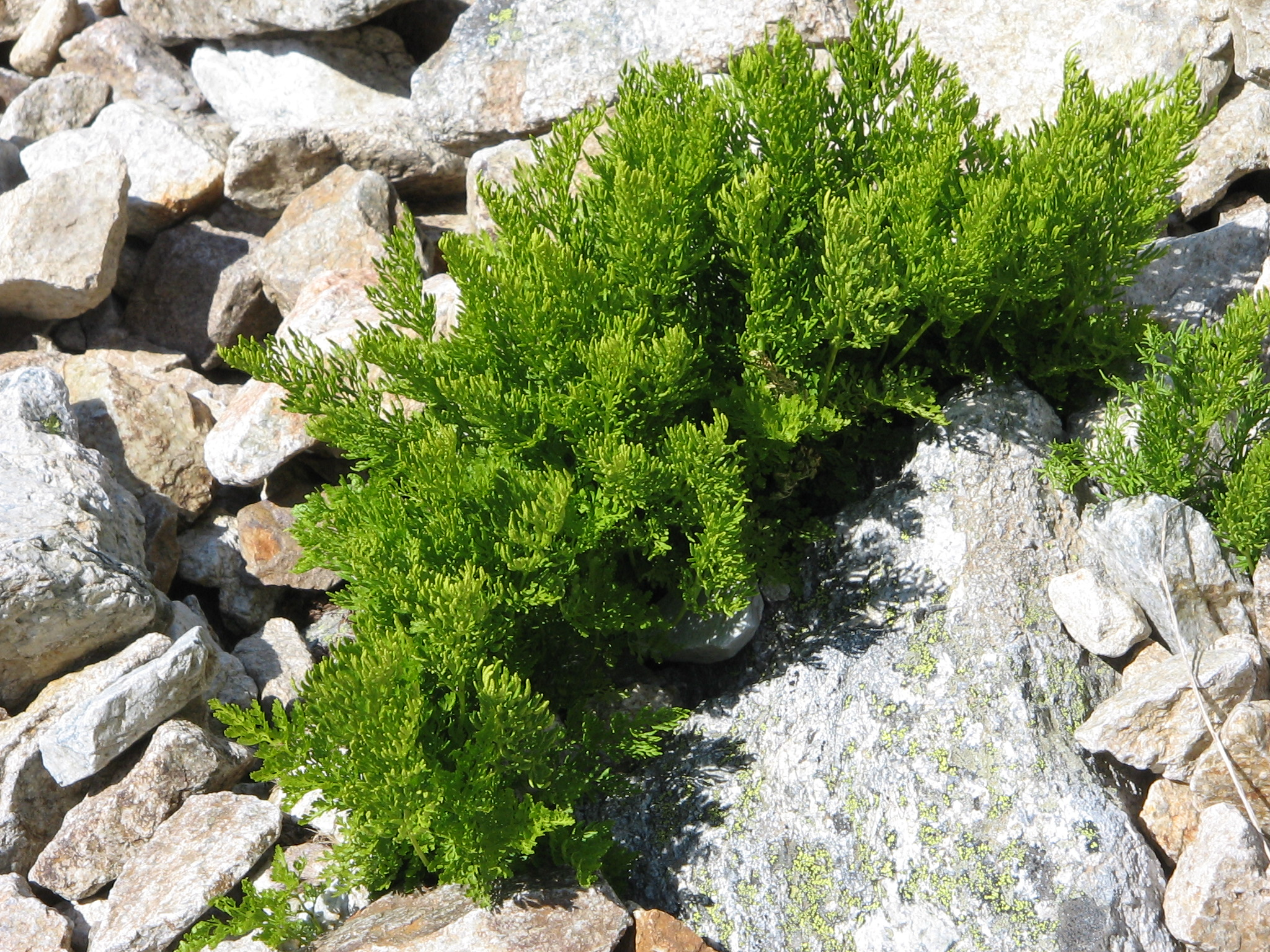

Scientific classification
- Kingdom: Plantae
- Clade: Embryophytes
- Clade: Tracheophytes
- Division: Polypodiophyta
- Class: Polypodiopsida
- Order: Polypodiales
- Family: Pteridaceae
- Genus: Cryptogramma
- Species: C. crispa

Binomial name
- Cryptogramma crispa (L.) R.Br. ex Hook.

Synonyms
- Osmunda crispa L.; Allosorus crispus (L.) Röhling

= Cryptogramma crispa =

Species of fern

Cryptogramma crispa, the parsley fern, is an Arctic–alpine species of fern native to Europe and parts of Asia. It produces separate sterile and fertile fronds, up to 30 cm (12 in) tall, and is a pioneer species on acidic screes.

== Description ==
The fronds of C. crispa are 30 centimetres (12 in) long and appear in two distinct forms. Sterile leaves are 2–3-pinnate with the pinnules 5–10 mm (0.2–0.4 in) long by 3–7 mm (0.1–0.3 in) wide, while fertile leaves are 3–4-pinnate, and with narrower pinnules. The fertile leaves have sori scattered along the veins, each with a strongly enrolled false indusium. The sporangia are yellow and mature around midsummer.

== Distribution and ecology ==
Cryptogramma crispa grows among acidic rocks, often in areas where snow lies until late in the year. It is a pioneer species on stable scree slopes and also occurs on cliffs and dry stone walls.

In Europe and western Asia, C. crispa has an Arctic–alpine distribution, growing in the mountains of Central and Southern Europe, as well as in the north of the continent, including Scandinavia and higher ground in the British Isles. In Ireland, it is rare and concentrated in the east of the country, leading Praeger to conjecture that the Irish examples are recent colonists from Great Britain, arriving as airborne spores. It is a rare, amber-listed plant of moderate conservation concern in the Isle of Man where it is a protected species listed on Schedule 7 of the Wildlife Act 1990.

The species also occurs in eastern Asia in Japan, Korea, and on the Russian island of Sakhalin.

Similar plants in western North America which were formerly sometimes considered varieties or subspecies of C. crispa, are now usually considered separate species, Cryptogramma acrostichoides, and Cryptogramma sitchensis.

Spores attributable to C. crispa have been discovered in deposits in Snowdonia from the last glacial period, as well as from more low-lying sites in Cheshire.

== Taxonomic history ==
The parsley fern appeared in Carl Linnaeus' 1753 work Species Plantarum, the starting point for botanical nomenclature, under the name Osmunda crispa. The specific epithet crispa means finely waved or curled. It is placed in the family Pteridaceae, part of the order Polypodiales.
