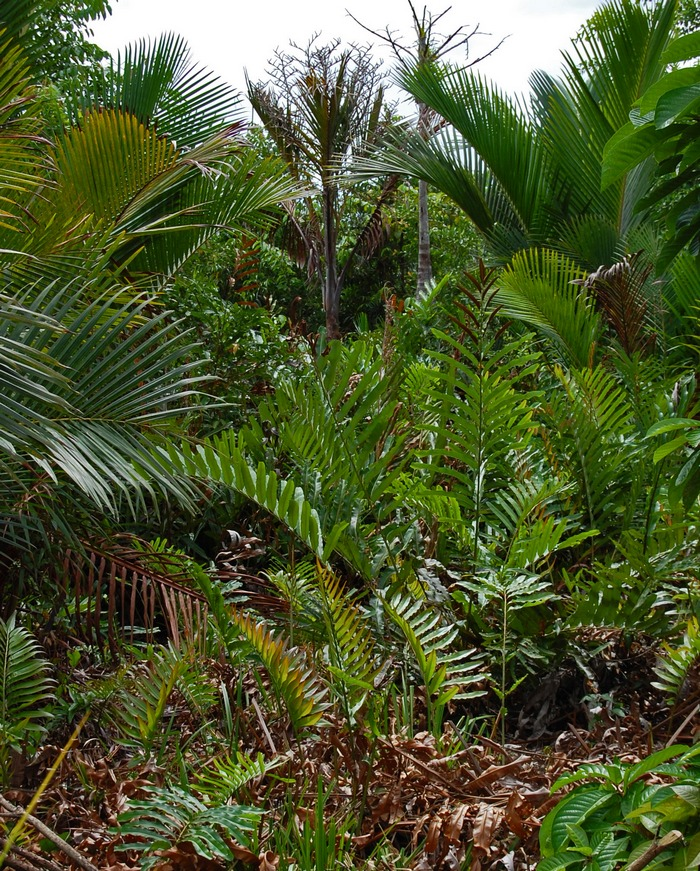
- Growing among Metroxylon sagu in Indonesia

Conservation status
- Least Concern (IUCN 3.1)

Scientific classification
- Kingdom: Plantae
- Clade: Tracheophytes
- Division: Polypodiophyta
- Class: Polypodiopsida
- Order: Polypodiales
- Family: Pteridaceae
- Genus: Acrostichum
- Species: A. aureum

Binomial name
- Acrostichum aureum L.

= Acrostichum aureum =

Golden leather fern

Species of fern

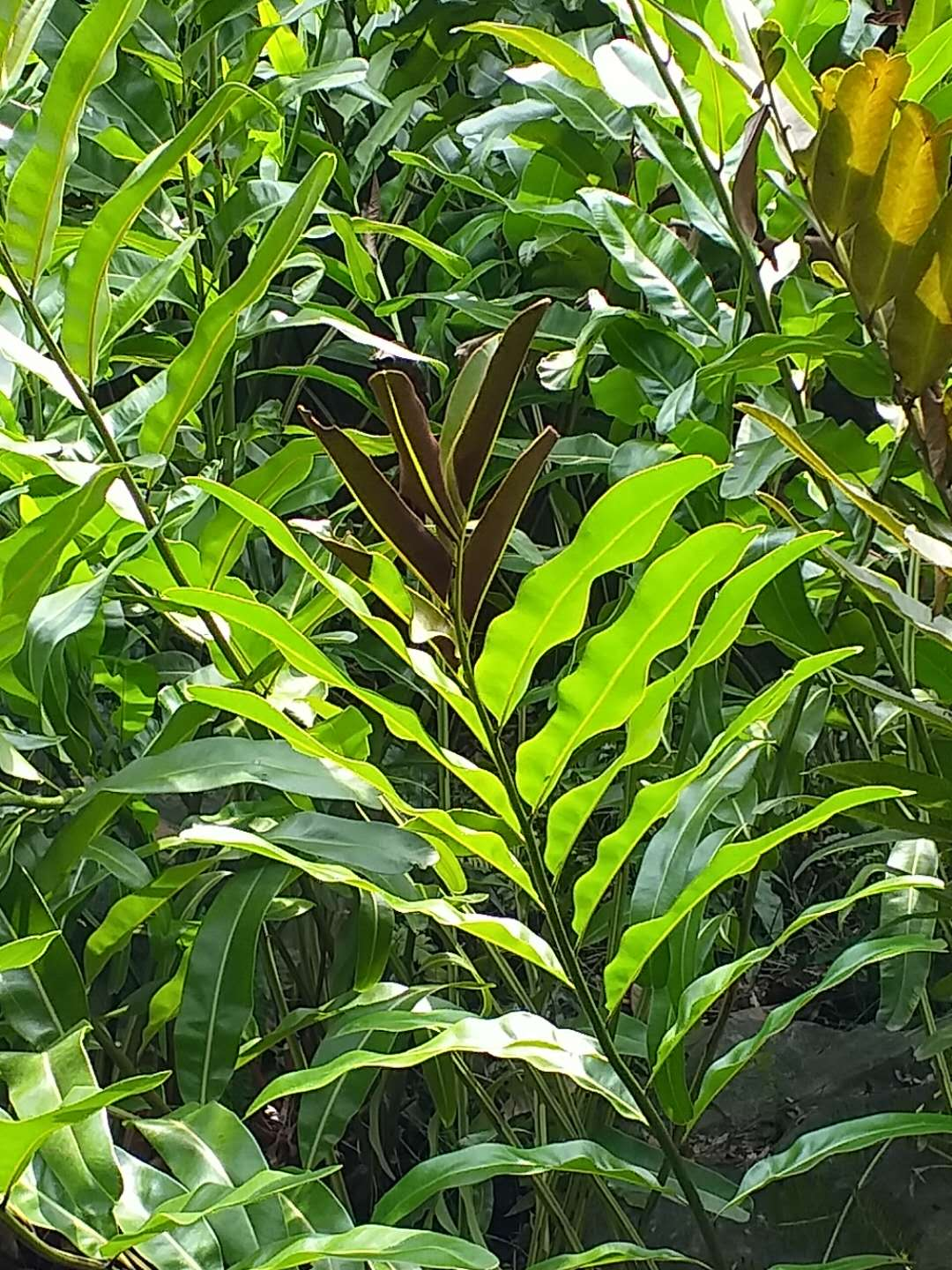
Sporophylls

Acrostichum aureum, the golden leather fern, is a large species of fern that grows in mangrove swamps and other wet locations. Other common names include swamp fern and mangrove fern.

== Description ==
The golden leather fern has large fronds growing to a length of 1.8 metres (5 ft 11 in). The leaves are glossy, broad and pinnate, the pinnae being dark green, leathery, alternate and widely spaced. The outer fronds arch over sideways but the central ones are nearly straight. Some of the larger fronds bear sporangia (reproductive organs) on the upper five to eight pairs of pinnae. These are brick red and give the pinnae a felted appearance.

== Distribution and habitat ==
The golden leather fern is found in tropical and sub-tropical areas around the world. It grows in swamps and mangrove forests, salt marshes and on river banks and is tolerant of raised salinity levels. The spores germinate better, however, in fresh water. It tends to grow on slight elevations in the mangrove swamp in areas which are inundated by the sea occasionally. It can also grow in freshwater locations. In Malaysia there are two plant forms. The larger ones occur on the periphery of the swamp where they may reach 4 metres (13 ft) while much more stunted plants grow in the areas which are frequently inundated. It can grow in full sun or in deep shade and it has been found that the mangrove Rhizophora mucronata can regenerate in dense stands of the fern. There are several kinds of ferns that are aquatic, but this is the only one that can grow in (and sometimes be submerged in) the ocean.

== Status ==
The IUCN Red List of Threatened Species lists the golden leather fern as being of "Least Concern"" because it is common, is fast growing, regenerates easily and has few threats. It grows vigorously in disturbed areas of mangrove forest and may be difficult to eradicate.

== Uses ==
In Cambodia, where the fern is known as prâng' tük (prâng'="cycad", tük="aquatic", Khmer language), the young leaves are eaten in salads.

In the Indian state of Goa, the fern crosiers (young fiddleheads) are cooked in a spicy coconut-based gravy known as tonak and consumed as a delicacy by the local people.

== Cultivation ==
Golden leather fern can be grown under high light in garden soil or potting mix, if the substrate is kept constantly wet. Ordinary fresh water (not brackish water) is sufficient for cultivation.
