= Antheridiogen =

Male inducing pheromone in ferns

Antheridiogens are a class of chemicals secreted by fern gametophytes that have "been shown to influence production of male gametangia and thus mating systems in a large number of terrestrial fern species". Antheridiogens are only observed in homosporous fern species, as all gametophytes are potentially bisexual (have the ability to produce both archegonia and antheridia).

== Background ==
The first study regarding antheridiogen was published by Walter Döpp in 1950. In this article, he explains the discovery of a molecule, which he titled "A-substanz", that caused premature formation of antheridia when agar media was reused after cultivation of Pteridium aquilinum. A majority of the studies regarding antheridiogen were done by two researchers, Ulrich Näf and H. Schraudolf.

== Sex-determination pathway ==
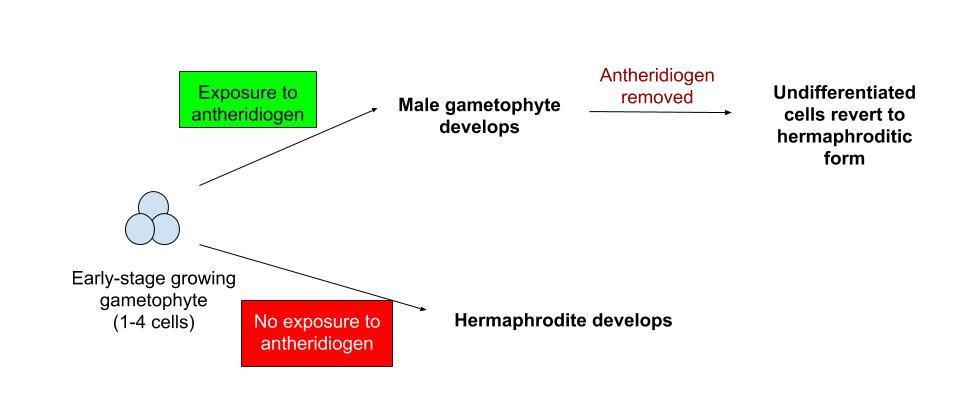
Flowchart depicting the phenomenon discovered in Ceratoperis richardii in which antheridiogen exposure influences the growth of a gametophyte starting in its very early stages.

The way in which antheridiogen determines sex in ferns is a "spatiotemporally split gibberellin synthesis pathway". Gibberellin is a group of hormones that control plant processes. In the first step of this process, gametophytes, or prothalli, express gibberellin (GA) specific genes, which produce a GA intermediate molecule that is then secreted into the external environment. In the second step, antheridiogens are taken up by neighboring gametophytes in the colony and undergo a series of molecular changes that allow them to finally induce or suppress formation of antheridia or archegonia. This helps regulate the sex ratio of the colony.

The timing with which antheridiogen affects the gender of growing gametophytes is still under study. One theory states that "the spores that germinate first develop as hermaphrodites and secrete antheridiogen, while those that germinate later or develop more slowly become male under the influence of the secreted antheridiogen". Depending on the ratio of males to hermaphrodites, either outcrossing or inbreeding is selected for by the population.

Studies performed on Ceratopteris richardii have proven that a growing gametophyte is only able to respond to its own antheridiogen for a brief period of time in very early stages of growth, and that if exposure is removed, undifferentiated cells can revert from male to hermaphrodite. The reversibility of male expression proves that levels of antheridiogen must be maintained in order to keep male expression from disappearing.

Antheridiogen has also been shown to allow spores that are grown in complete darkness to grow. Spores that are buried underground, if reached by antheridiogen, can form gametophytes that reach the surface. Or, they form a small amount of antheridia, and the sperm produced can reach the female gametophytes above ground.

The way in which the sex of each individual is determined is a form of environmental sex determination (ESD). In contrast to chromosomal sex determination, sex determination through ESD is extremely flexible, allowing for sex changes throughout the individual's life in response to colony or environmental changes. One study performed on the fern species Woodwardia radicans found that sex expression of mature gametophytes is dependent on stress conditions. In good conditions, gametophytes reached sexual maturity at a larger size and became females and then bisexuals, whereas in stressful conditions, gametophytes reached sexual maturity at a smaller size and became males.

== Connections ==
The idea of an antheridiogen is very similar to that of pheromones, which exist in some mammals. Although mammalian sex determination is decided by chromosomes, chemicals called pheromones are released, detected by the olfactory system, and can control social behaviors and hormone levels. The presence of human pheromones remains a long-contested topic, as there have not been any studies that completely prove the existence of pheromones or of a possible pathway of detection.
