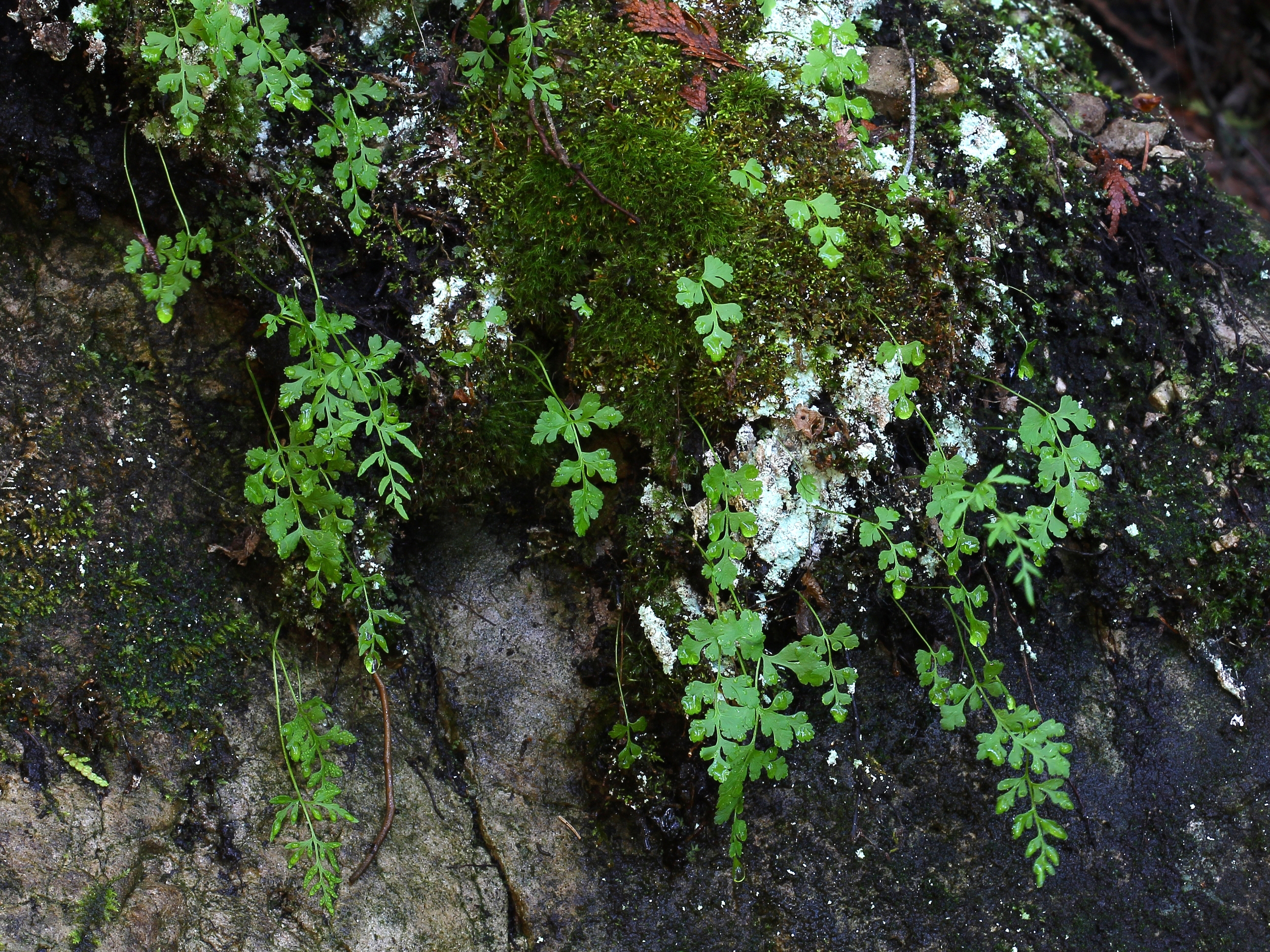

Conservation status
- Least Concern (IUCN 3.1)

Scientific classification
- Kingdom: Plantae
- Clade: Embryophytes
- Clade: Tracheophytes
- Division: Polypodiophyta
- Class: Polypodiopsida
- Order: Polypodiales
- Family: Pteridaceae
- Genus: Cryptogramma
- Species: C. stelleri

Binomial name
- Cryptogramma stelleri (S.G.Gmel.) Prantl

= Cryptogramma stelleri =

Species of fern

Cryptogramma stelleri, common names slender cliff-brake, fragile rock-brake, slender rock-brake, and Steller's rockbrake, is a plant found widely in temperate regions of Asia and North America. It is a lithophyte, growing on rocky substrates.

It is listed as endangered in Connecticut, Massachusetts, New Jersey, and Pennsylvania. It is listed as threatened in Maine and New Hampshire, as exploitably vulnerable in New York (state) and as sensitive in Washington (state).

Cryptogramma stelleri is known to be able to use artificial light to grow in places which are otherwise devoid of natural light, such as Crystal Cave in Wisconsin.
