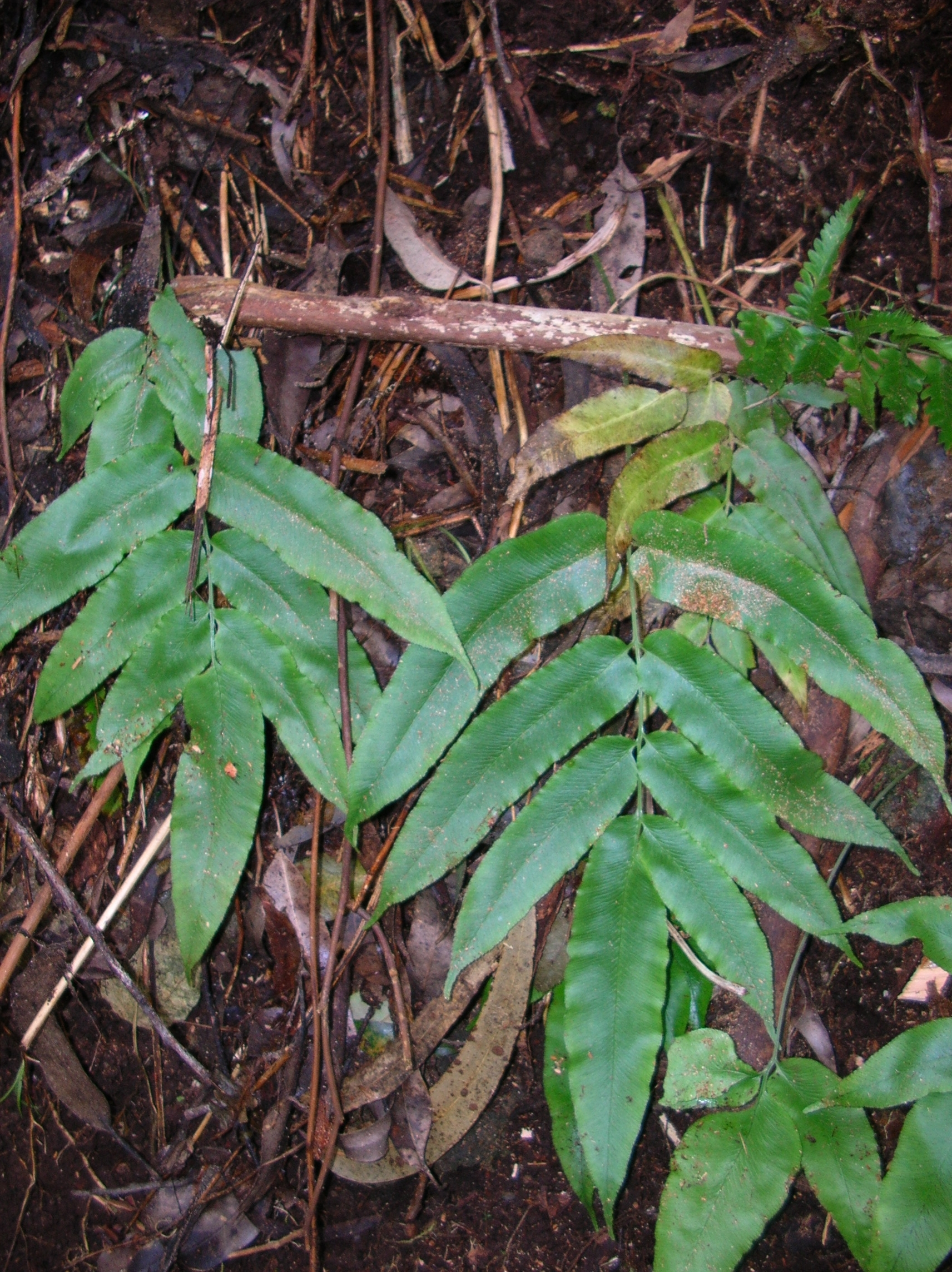
- Coniogramme pilosa

Scientific classification
- Kingdom: Plantae
- Clade: Tracheophytes
- Division: Polypodiophyta
- Class: Polypodiopsida
- Order: Polypodiales
- Family: Pteridaceae
- Subfamily: Cryptogrammoideae
- Genus: Coniogramme; Fée

Type species
- Coniogramme javanica (Blume) Fée

Species
- See text

Synonyms
- Dictyogramme Fée 1850-52; Neurosorus Trevisan de Saint-Léon 1851; Notogramme Presl 1849-51

= Coniogramme =

Genus of ferns

Coniogramme is one of three genera in the subfamily Cryptogrammoideae of the fern family Pteridaceae. Species originate from (mostly tropical) Africa and Asia, with a cultivar of Coniogramme pilosa, known as "bamboo fern."

== Phylogeny ==
Phylogeny of Coniogramme

- Coniogramme
  - - C. robusta Christ ex Hieron.
    - - C. gracilis M. Ogata
      - - C. japonica (Thunb.) Diels (bamboo fern)
        - C. jinggangshanensis Ching & K.H. Shing
  - - - C. rosthornii Hieron.
      - C. wilsonii Hieron
    - - - C. africana Hieron.
        - - C. procera (Wall.) Fée
          - C. rubicaulis Ching
      - - - C. emeiensis Ching & K.H. Shing
          - C. suprapilosa Ching
        - - C. intermedia Hieronymus
          - - C. fraxinea (D. Don) Diels
            - - - C. affinis (C. Presl) Wall. ex Hieron.
                - C. pubescens Hieron.
              - - C. serrulata (BI.) Fée
                - - C. falcipinna Ching & K.H. Shing
                  - C. sinensis Ching

Other species include:
- C. bashanensis Guo & Li
- C. denticulatoserrata (Hieronymus) Dixit & Das
- C. ×fauriei Hieronymus {Coniogramme japonica x Coniogramme intermedia}
- C. ovata S.K. Wu
- C. pilosa (Brackenr.) Hieron.
- C. venusta Ching
