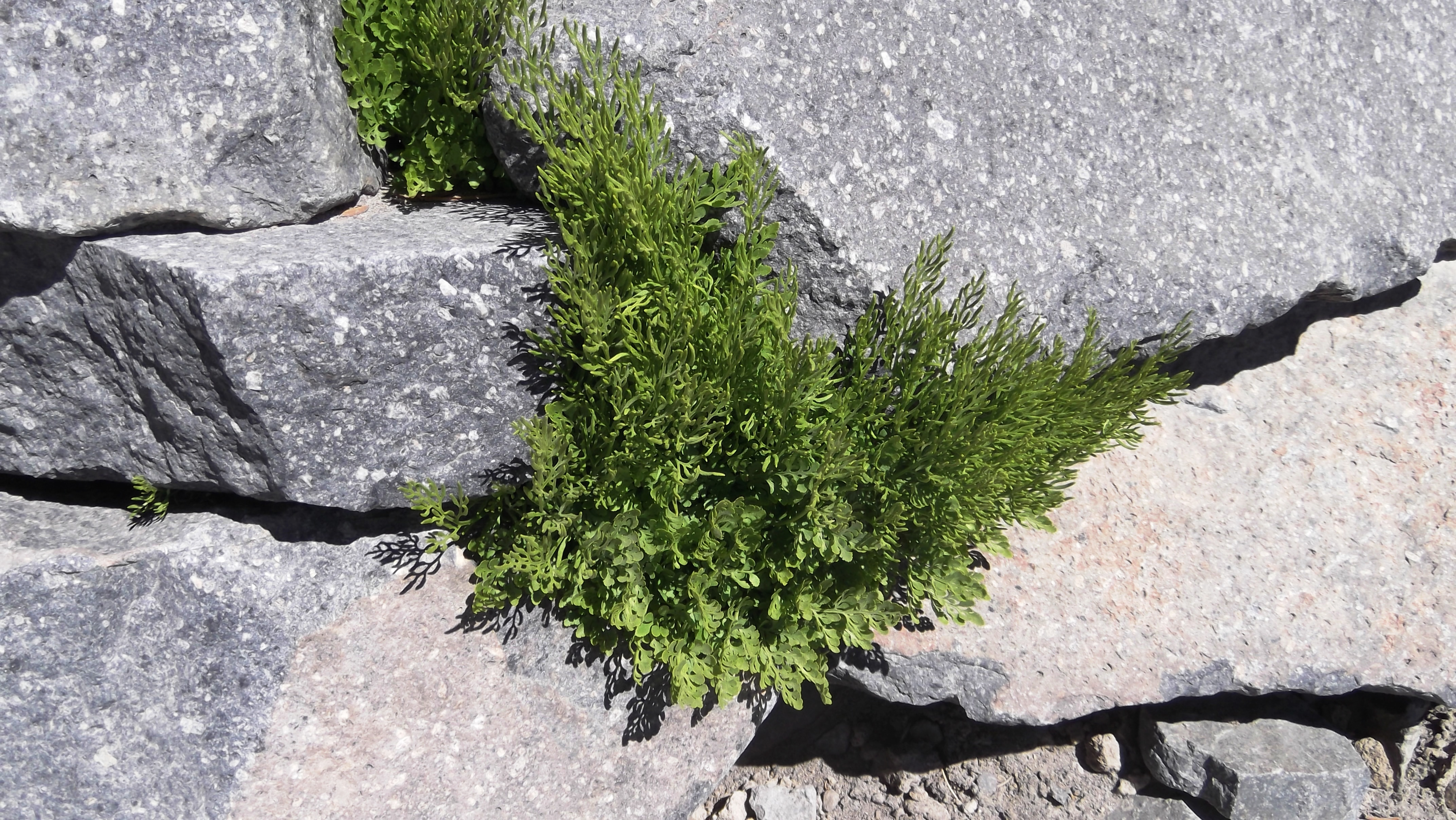
- Cryptogramma acrostichoides on Mount Rainier

Scientific classification
- Kingdom: Plantae
- Clade: Embryophytes
- Clade: Tracheophytes
- Division: Polypodiophyta
- Class: Polypodiopsida
- Order: Polypodiales
- Family: Pteridaceae
- Subfamily: Cryptogrammoideae
- Genus: Cryptogramma; R.Br.

Type species
- Cryptogramma acrostichoides R.Br.

Species
- See text

Synonyms
- Phorolobus Desvaux 1827

= Cryptogramma =

Genus of ferns

Cryptogramma is a genus of ferns known commonly as parsley ferns or rockbrakes. They are one of the three genera in the subfamily Cryptogrammoideae of the family Pteridaceae. Cryptogramma ferns can be found in temperate regions on several continents worldwide. These ferns have two kinds of leaves which often look so different that at first glance they appear to belong to different plants. The fertile leaves have long, narrow, bumpy segments with undersides covered thickly in sporangia. The edges of the segments may curl back to cover the sporangia, forming a false indusium. The sterile leaves have thinner, wider segments which may be rounded and resemble the leaves of parsley. These ferns grow in rocky areas, often in crevices and cracks, particularly on mountain scree.

== Distribution ==
Species in this genus are distributed widely over the temperate Northern Hemisphere, with one species in the temperate Southern Hemisphere in Chile and Argentina.

== Taxonomy ==
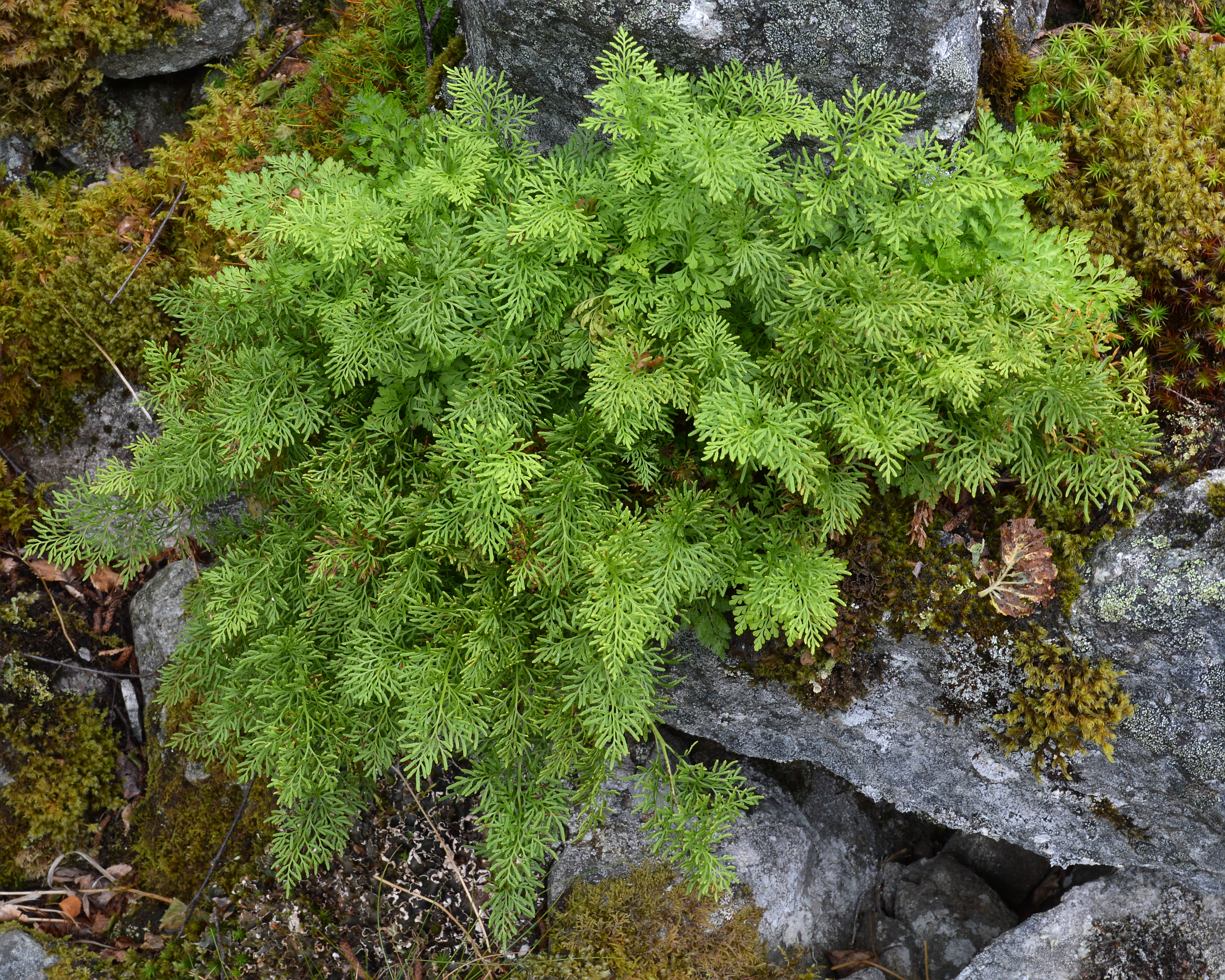
Cryptogramma crispa in Norway

Eight species are accepted by the Plants of the World Online (POWO) database:

- Cryptogramma acrostichoides R.Br.
- Cryptogramma brunoniana Wall. ex Hook. & Grev.
- Cryptogramma cascadensis E.R.Alverson
- Cryptogramma crispa (L.) R.Br.
- Cryptogramma fumariifolia (Phil.) Christ
- Cryptogramma gorovoii Vaganov & Shmakov
- Cryptogramma sitchensis (Rupr.) T.Moore
- Cryptogramma stelleri (S.G.Gmel.) Prantl

Two other species, Cryptogramma bithynica S.Jess., L.Lehm. & Bujnoch and Cryptogramma raddeana Fomin, are accepted by some authors, (Note: Enter Cryptogramma in the search box, and see taxa labelled 'Valid'.) but are treated as a synonym of C. crispa, and a subspecies of C. brunoniana, respectively, by POWO.

=== Phylogeny ===
Phylogeny of Cryptogramma

- Cryptogramma
  - C. stelleri (S.G.Gmel.) Prantl (fragile rockbrake, Steller's rockbrake, slender rockbrake)
  - - C. fumariifolia (Phil. ex Baker) Christ
    - - C. brunoniana Wallich ex Hooker & Greville
      - - - C. acrostichoides Brown (American rockbrake)
          - C. sitchensis (Ruprecht) Moore (Sitka rockbrake)
        - - C. cascadensis Alverson (Cascade rockbrake)
          - - C. gorovoii Vaganov & Shmakov
            - - C. bithynica (Jessen, L.Lehm. & Bujnoch)
              - C. crispa (von Linné) Brown ex Hooker (parsley fern)
