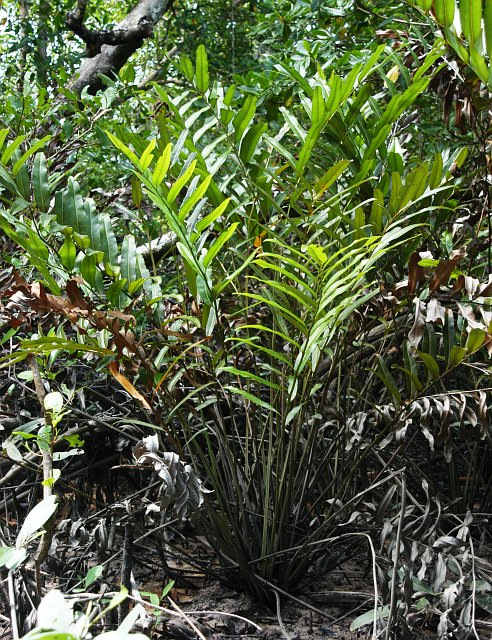

Scientific classification
- Kingdom: Plantae
- Clade: Tracheophytes
- Division: Polypodiophyta
- Class: Polypodiopsida
- Order: Polypodiales
- Family: Pteridaceae
- Subfamily: Parkerioideae; Burnett

Genera
- Acrostichum; Ceratopteris

Synonyms
- Parkeriaceae Hook.; Ceratopteridaceae Underw.; Ceratopteridoideae R.M.Tryon

= Parkerioideae =

Subfamily of ferns

Parkerioideae, synonym Ceratopteridoideae, is one of the five subfamilies in the fern family Pteridaceae. It includes only the two genera Acrostichum and Ceratopteris. The following diagram shows a likely phylogenic relationship between the two Parkerioideae genera and the other Pteridaceae subfamilies.

- Pteridaceae
  - Cryptogrammoideae
  - - - Ceratopteridoideae
        - Acrostichum
        - Ceratopteris
      - Pteridoideae
    - - Cheilanthoideae
      - Vittarioideae
