= Glossary of plant morphology =

This page provides a glossary of plant morphology. Botanists and other biologists who study plant morphology use a number of different terms to classify and identify plant organs and parts that can be observed using no more than a handheld magnifying lens. This page provides help in understanding the numerous other pages describing plants by their various taxa. The accompanying page—Plant morphology—provides an overview of the science of the external form of plants. There is also an alphabetical list: Glossary of botanical terms. In contrast, this page deals with botanical terms in a systematic manner, with some illustrations, and organized by plant anatomy and function in plant physiology.

This glossary primarily includes terms that deal with vascular plants (ferns, gymnosperms and angiosperms), particularly flowering plants (angiosperms). Non-vascular plants (bryophytes), with their different evolutionary background, tend to have separate terminology. Although plant morphology (the external form) is integrated with plant anatomy (the internal form), the former became the basis of the taxonomic description of plants that exists today, due to the few tools required to observe.

Many of these terms date back to the earliest herbalists and botanists, including Theophrastus. Thus, they usually have Greek or Latin roots. These terms have been modified and added to over the years, and different authorities may not always use them the same way.

This page has two parts: The first deals with general plant terms, and the second with specific plant structures or parts.

== General plant terms ==
- Abaxial – located on the side facing away from the axis.
- Adaxial – located on the side facing towards the axis.
- Dehiscent – opening at maturity
- Gall – outgrowth on the surface caused by invasion by other lifeforms, such as parasites
- Indehiscent – not opening at maturity
- Reticulate – web-like or network-like
- Striated – marked by a series of lines, grooves, or ridges
- Tesselate – marked by a pattern of polygons, usually rectangles
- Wing (plant) – any flat surfaced structure emerging from the side or summit of an organ; seeds, stems.

=== Plant habit ===
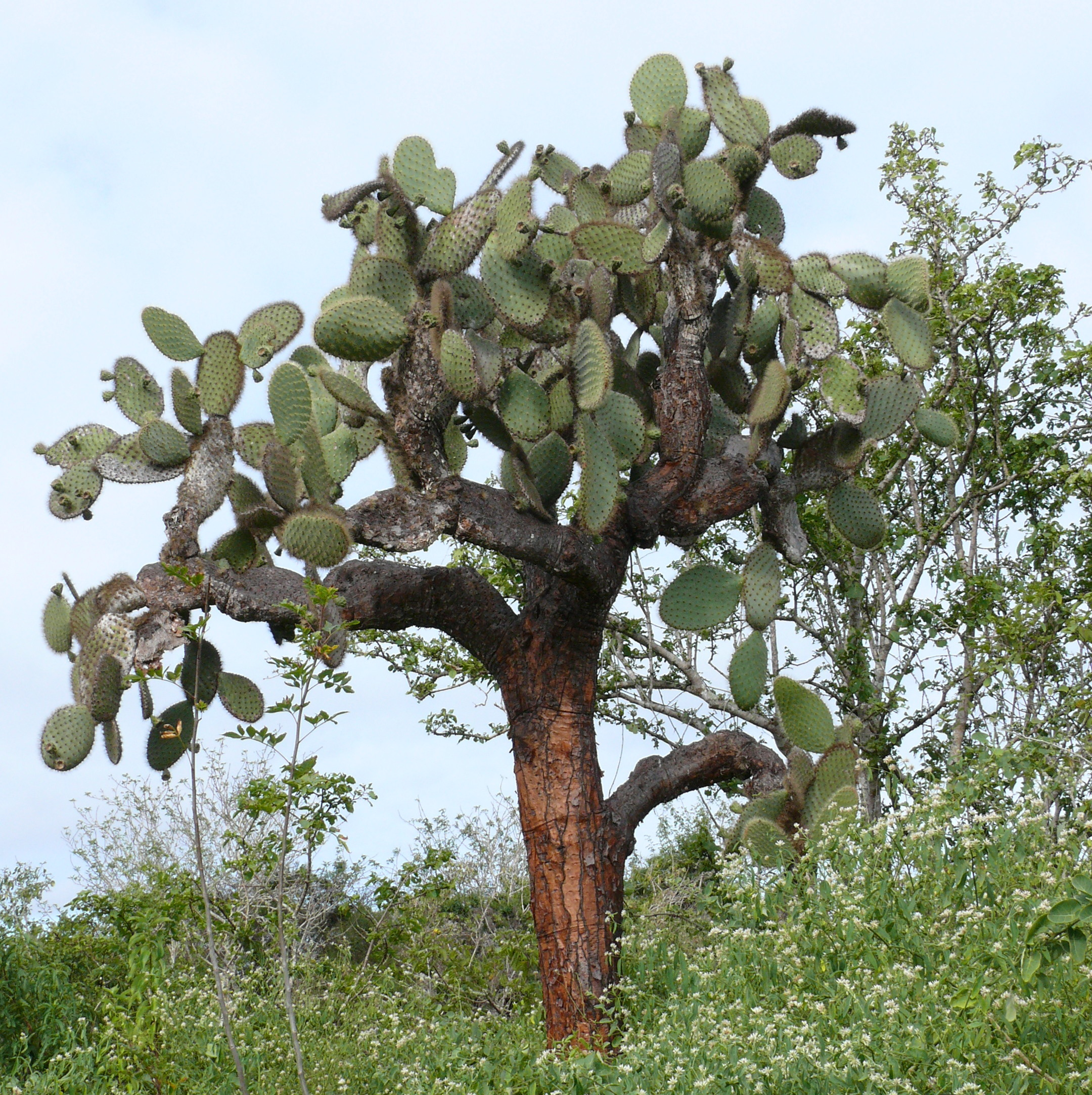
Opuntia galapageia, a species of prickly pear cactus, has a tree-like habit on the moist Galápagos Islands.

Plant habit or habitus refers to the overall shape of a plant, and it describes a number of components such as stem length and development, branching pattern, and texture. While many plants fit neatly into some main categories, such as grasses, vines, shrubs, or trees, others can be more difficult to categorise. The habit of a plant provides important information about its ecology: that is, how it has adapted to its environment. Each habit indicates a different adaptive strategy. Habit is also associated with the development of the plant. As such, it may change as the plant grows and is more properly called its growth habit. In addition to shape, habit indicates plant structure; for instance, whether the plant is herbaceous or woody.

Each plant commences its growth as a herbaceous plant. Plants that remain herbaceous are shorter and seasonal, dying back at the end of their growth season. Woody plants—such as trees, shrubs and woody vines (lianas)—will gradually acquire woody (lignaceous) tissues, which provide strength and protection for the vascular system, and they tend to be tall and relatively long lived. The formation of woody tissue is an example of secondary growth, a change in existing tissues, in contrast to primary growth that creates new tissues, such as the elongating tip of a plant shoot. The process of wood formation (lignification) is commonest in the spermatophytes (seed bearing plants) and has evolved independently a number of times. The roots may also lignify, aiding in the role of supporting and anchoring tall plants, and may be part of a descriptor of the plant's habit.

Plant habit can also refer to whether the plant possesses any specialised systems for the storage of carbohydrates or water, allowing the plant to renew its growth after an unfavourable period. Where the amount of water stored is relatively high, the plant is referred to as a succulent. Such specialised plant parts may arise from the stems or roots. Examples include plants growing in unfavourable climates, very dry climates where storage is intermittent depending on climatic conditions, and those adapted to surviving fires and regrowing from the soil afterwards.

Terms used in describing plant habit, include:

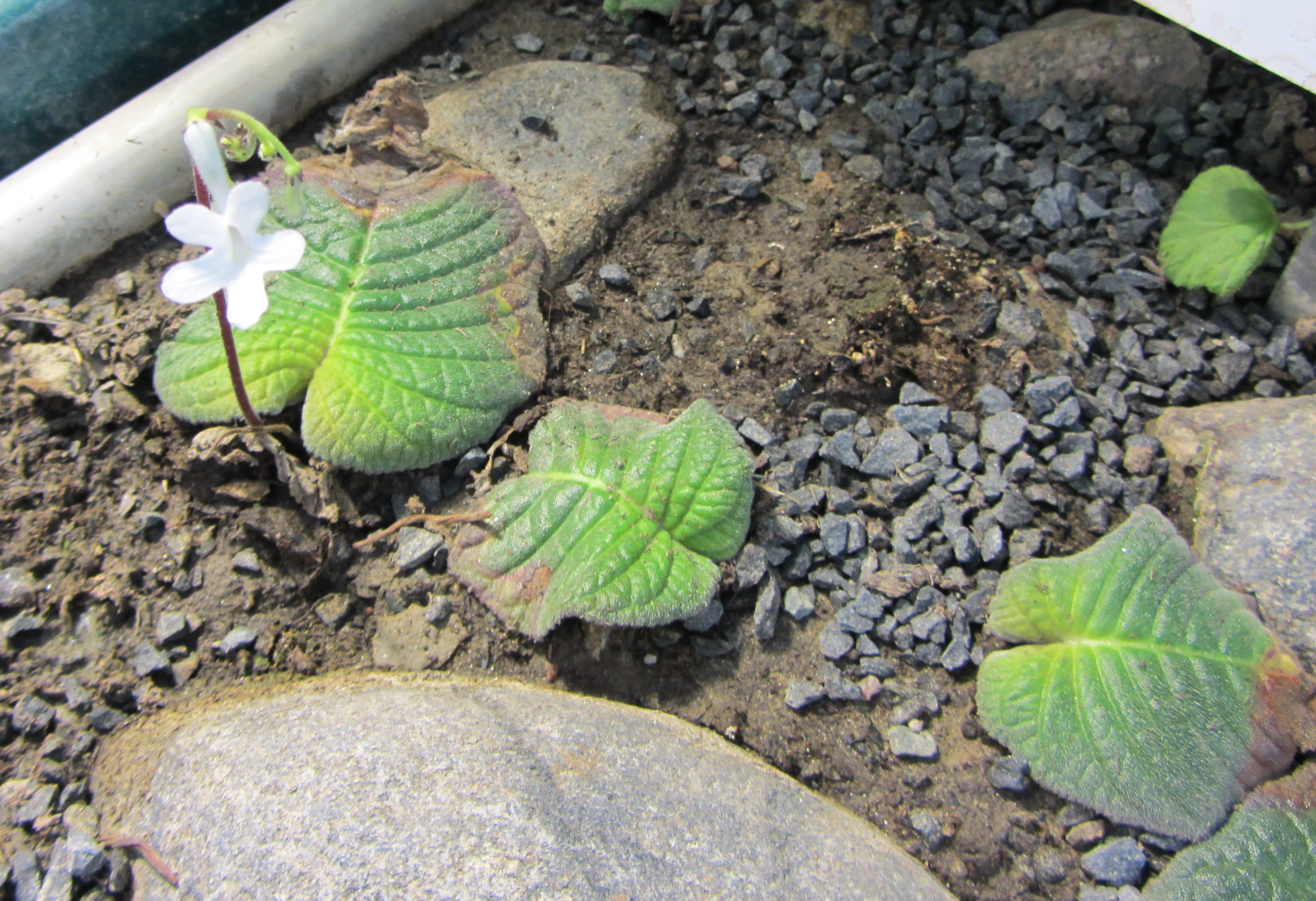
An acaulescent species of Streptocarpus has only one leaf, and appears to have no stem

- Acaulescent – the leaves and inflorescence rise from the ground, and appear to have no stem. They are also known as rosette forms, some of the many conditions that result from very short internodes (i.e. close distances between nodes on the plant stem. See also radical, where leaves arise apparently without stems.
- Acid plant – plants with acid saps, normally due to the production of ammonium salts (malic and oxalic acid)
- Actinomorphic – parts of plants that are radially symmetrical in arrangement.
- Arborescent – growing into a tree-like habit, normally with a single woody stem.
- Ascending – growing uprightly, in an upward direction.
- Assurgent – growth ascending.
- Branching – dividing into multiple smaller segments.
- Caducous – falling away early.
- Caulescent – with a well-developed stem above ground.
- Caulirosulate - arranged in rose-like clusters at the end of the stem (to describe leaves or bracts).
- Cespitose – forming dense tufts, normally applied to small plants typically growing into mats, tufts, or clumps.
- Creeping – growing along the ground and producing roots at intervals along the surface.
- Deciduous – falling away after its function is completed.
- Decumbent – growth starts off prostrate and the ends turn upright.
- Deflexed – bending downward.
- Determinate growth – Growing for a limited time, floral formation and leaves (see also Indeterminate).
- Dimorphic – of two different forms.
- Ecad – a plant assumed to be adapted to a specific habitat.
- Ecotone – the boundary that separates two plant communities, generally of major rank – trees in woods and grasses in savanna for example.
- Ectogenesis – variation in plants due to conditions outside of the plants.
- Ectoparasite – a parasitic plant that has most of its mass outside of the host, the body and reproductive organs of the plant live outside of the host.
- Epigeal – living on the surface of the ground. See also terms for seeds.
  - Epigean – occurring on the ground.
  - Epigeic – plants with stolons on the ground.
  - Epigeous – on the ground. Used for leaf fungus that live on the surface of the leaf.
- Epiphloedal – growing on the bark of trees.
  - Epiphloedic – an organism that grows on the bark of trees.
- Epiphyllous – growing on the leaves. For example, Helwingia japonica has epiphyllous flowers (ones that form on the leaves).
- Epiphyte – growing on another organism but not parasitic. Not growing on the ground.
  - Epiphytic – having the nature of an epiphyte.
- Equinoctial – a plant that has flowers that open and close at definite times during the day.
- Erect – having an essentially upright vertical habit or position.
- Escape – a plant originally under cultivation that has become wild, a garden plant growing in natural areas.
- Evergreen – remaining green in the winter or during the normal dormancy period for other plants.
- Eupotamous – living in rivers and streams.
- Euryhaline – normally living in salt water but tolerant of variable salinity.
- Eurythermous – tolerant of a wide range of temperatures.
- Exclusive species – confined to specific location.
- Exotic – not native to the area or region.
- Exsiccatus – a dried plant, most often used for specimens in a herbarium.
- Indeterminate growth – Inflorescence and leaves growing for an indeterminate time, until stopped by other factors such as frost (see also Determinate).
- Lax – non upright, growth not strictly upright or hangs down from the point of origin.
- Lithophyte – Growing on rocks
  - Endolithic – growing in crevices of rocks.
  - Epilithic – growing on the surface of rocks.
- Mallee – a term applied to certain Australian species which grow with multiple stems springing from an underground lignotuber.
- Parasitic – using another plant as a source of nourishment.
- Precocious – flowering before the leaves emerge.
- Procumbent – growing prostrate or trailing, but not rooting at the nodes.
- Prostrate – lying flat on the ground, leaves, stems or even flowers in some species.
- Repent – creeping.
- Rosette – cluster of leaves with very short internodes that are crowded together, normally on the surface of the soil but sometimes higher on the stem.
  - Rostellate – like a rosette (cf. rostellum).
  - Rosulate – arranged into a rosette.
- Runner – an elongated, slender branch that roots at the nodes or tip.
- Stolon – A branch that forms near the base of the plant, grows horizontally, and roots and produces new plants at the nodes or apex.
  - Stoloniferous – plants producing stolons.
- Semi-erect – Not growing perfectly straight.
- Suffrutescent – Being woody at the base, with herbaceous branches.
- Upright – Growing upward.
- Virgate – wand-like, slender erect growing stem with many leaves or very short branches.
- Woody – forming secondary growth laterally around the plant so as to form wood.

=== Duration ===
Duration of individual plant lives are described using these terms:

- Acme – the time when the plant or population has its maximum vigor.
- Annual – plants that live, reproduce, and die in one growing season.
- Biennial – plants that need two growing seasons to complete their life cycle, normally completing vegetative growth the first year and flowering the second year.
- Herbs – see herbaceous.
- Herbaceous – plants with shoot systems that die back to the ground each year – both annual and non-woody perennial plants.
- Herbaceous perennial – non-woody plants that live for more than two years, with the shoot system dying back to soil level each year.
- Woody perennial – true shrubs and trees, and some vines, with shoot systems that remain alive above the soil level from one year to the next.
- Monocarpic – plants that live for a number of years then, after flowering and seed setting, die.

== Plant structures ==
=== Introduction ===
Life cycles

Alternating generations: Haploid gametophyte (top), diploid sporophyte (bottom)

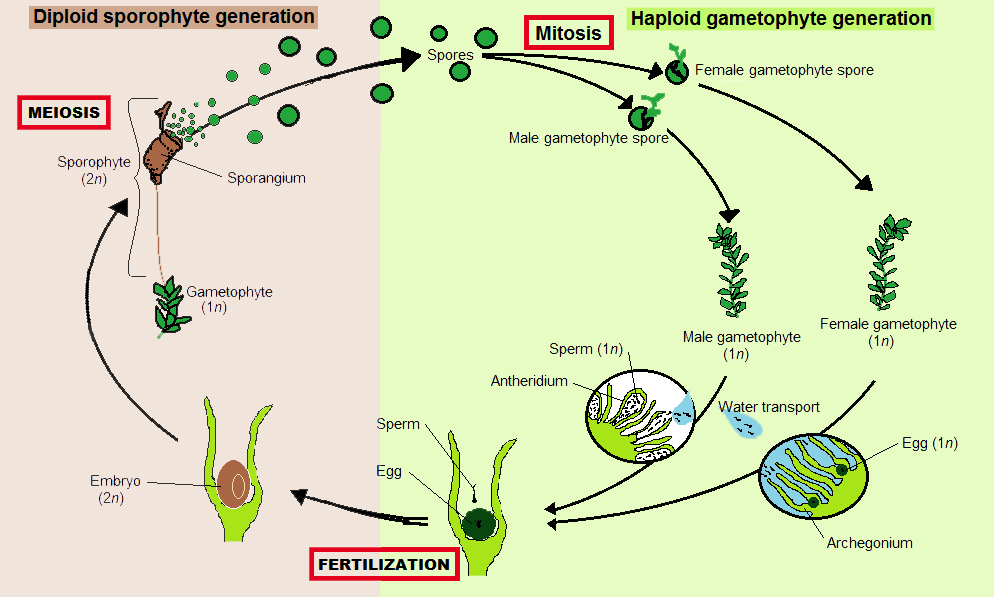
Bryophytes

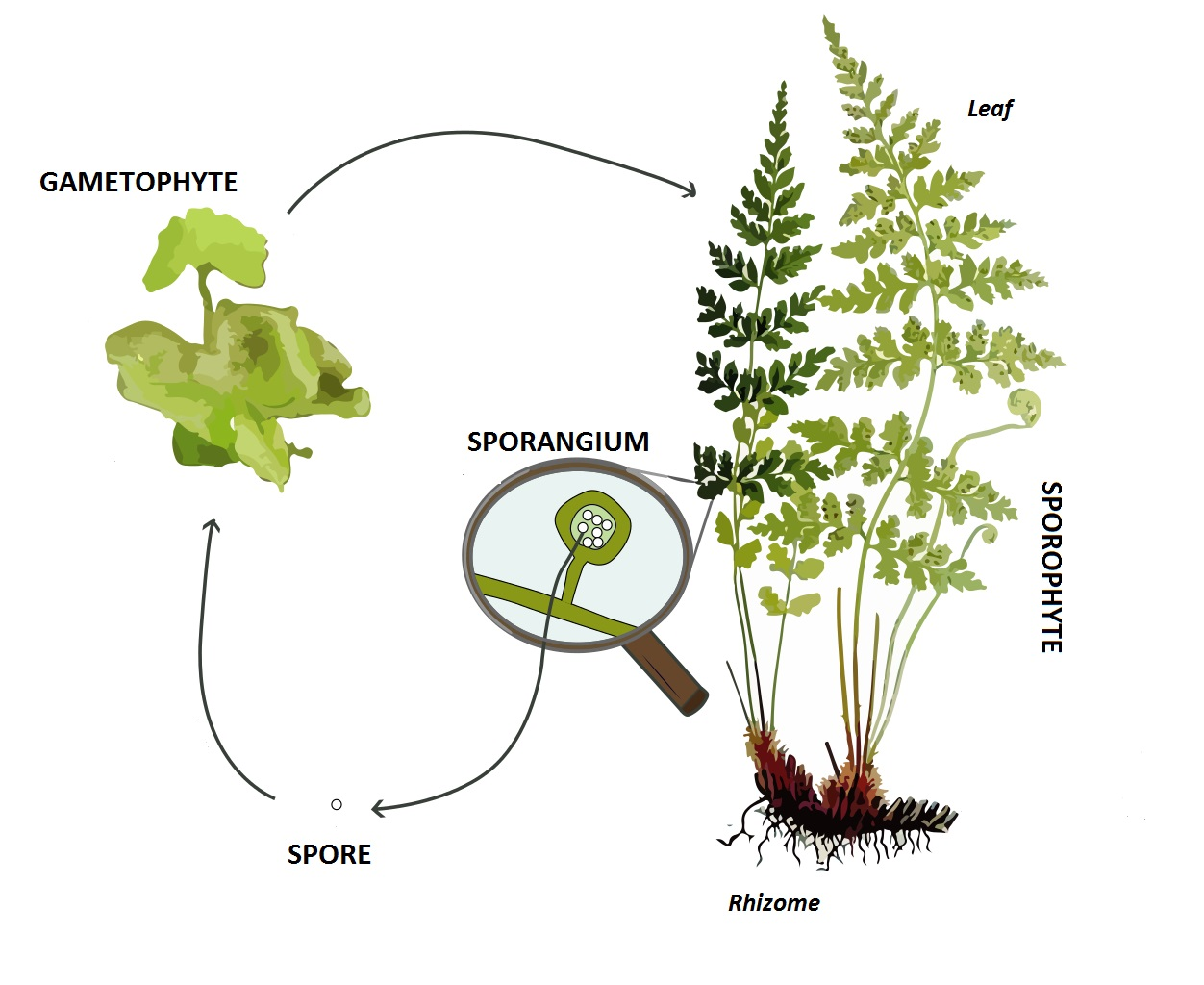
Pteridophyte

Angiosperms. Only the sporophyte is visible, the gametophytes being the pollen and ovule

Plant structures or organs fulfill specific functions, and those functions determine the structures that perform them. Among terrestrial (land) plants, the vascular and non-vascular plants (Bryophytes) evolved independently in terms of their adaptation to terrestrial life and are treated separately here (see Bryophytes).

==== Life cycle ====
Common structural elements are present in the embryonic part of the life cycle, which is the diploid multicellular phase. The embryo develops into the sporophyte, which at maturity produces haploid spores, which germinate to produce the gametophyte, the haploid multicellular phase. The haploid gametophyte then produces gametes, which may fuse to form a diploid zygote, and finally an embryo. This phenomenon of alternating diploid and haploid multicellular phases is common to the embryophytes (land plants) and is referred to as the alternation of generations. A major difference between vascular and non-vascular plants is that in the latter the haploid gametophyte is the more visible and longer-lived stage. In vascular plants, the diploid sporophyte has evolved as the dominant and visible phase of the life cycle. In seed plants and some other groups of vascular plants the gametophyte phases are strongly reduced in size and contained within the pollen and ovules. The female gametophyte is entirely contained within the sporophyte's tissues, while the male gametophyte in its pollen grain is released and transferred by wind or animal vectors to fertilize the ovules.

==== Morphology ====
Amongst the vascular plants, the structures and functions of the Pteridophyta (ferns), which reproduce seedlessly, are also sufficiently different to justify separate treatment, as here (see Pteridophytes). The remainder of the vascular plant sections address the higher plants (spermatophytes or seed plants, i.e. gymnosperms and angiosperms or flowering plants). In the higher plants, the terrestrial sporophyte has evolved specialised parts. In essence, they have a lower, underground component and an upper, aerial component. The underground part develops roots that seek water and nourishment from the soil, while the upper component, or shoot, grows toward the light and develops a plant stem, leaves and specialised reproductive structures (sporangia). In angiosperms, the sporangia are located in the stamen anthers (microsporangia) and ovules (megasporangia). The specialised sporangia bearing stem is the flower. In angiosperms, if the female sporangium is fertilised, it becomes the fruit, a mechanism for dispersing the seeds produced from the embryo.

===== Vegetative structures =====
Thus, the terrestrial sporophyte has two growth centres, the stem growing upwards while the roots grow downwards. New growth occurs at the tips (apices) of both the shoot and roots, where the undifferentiated cells of the meristem divide. Branching occurs to form new apical meristems. Growth of the stem is indeterminate in pattern (not pre-determined to stop at a particular point). The functions of the stem are to raise and support the leaves and reproductive organs above the level of the soil, to facilitate absorption of light for photosynthesis, gas exchange, water exchange (transpiration), pollination, and seed dispersal. The stem also serves as a conduit, from roots to overhead structures, for water and other growth-enhancing substances. These conduits consist of specialised tissues known as vascular bundles, which give the name "vascular plants" to the angiosperms. The point of insertion, on the stem, of leaves or buds is a node, and the space between two successive nodes, an internode.

The leaves, which emerge from the shoot, are specialised structures that carry out photosynthesis, and gas (oxygen and carbon dioxide) and water exchange. They are sheathed by an outer layer or epidermis that is coated with a waxy waterproof protective layer, which is punctuated by specialised pores, known as stomata, which regulate gas and water exchange. The leaves also possess vascular bundles, which are generally visible as veins, whose patterns are called venation. Leaves tend to have a shorter life span than the stems or branches that bear them, and when they fall, an area at the attachment zone, called the abscission zone leaves a scar on the stem.

In the angle (adaxial) between the leaf and the stem, is the axil. Here can be found buds (axillary buds), which are miniature and often dormant branches with their own apical meristem. They are often covered by leaves.

===== Floral structure =====
Floral structure

Location of main floral parts in angiosperms

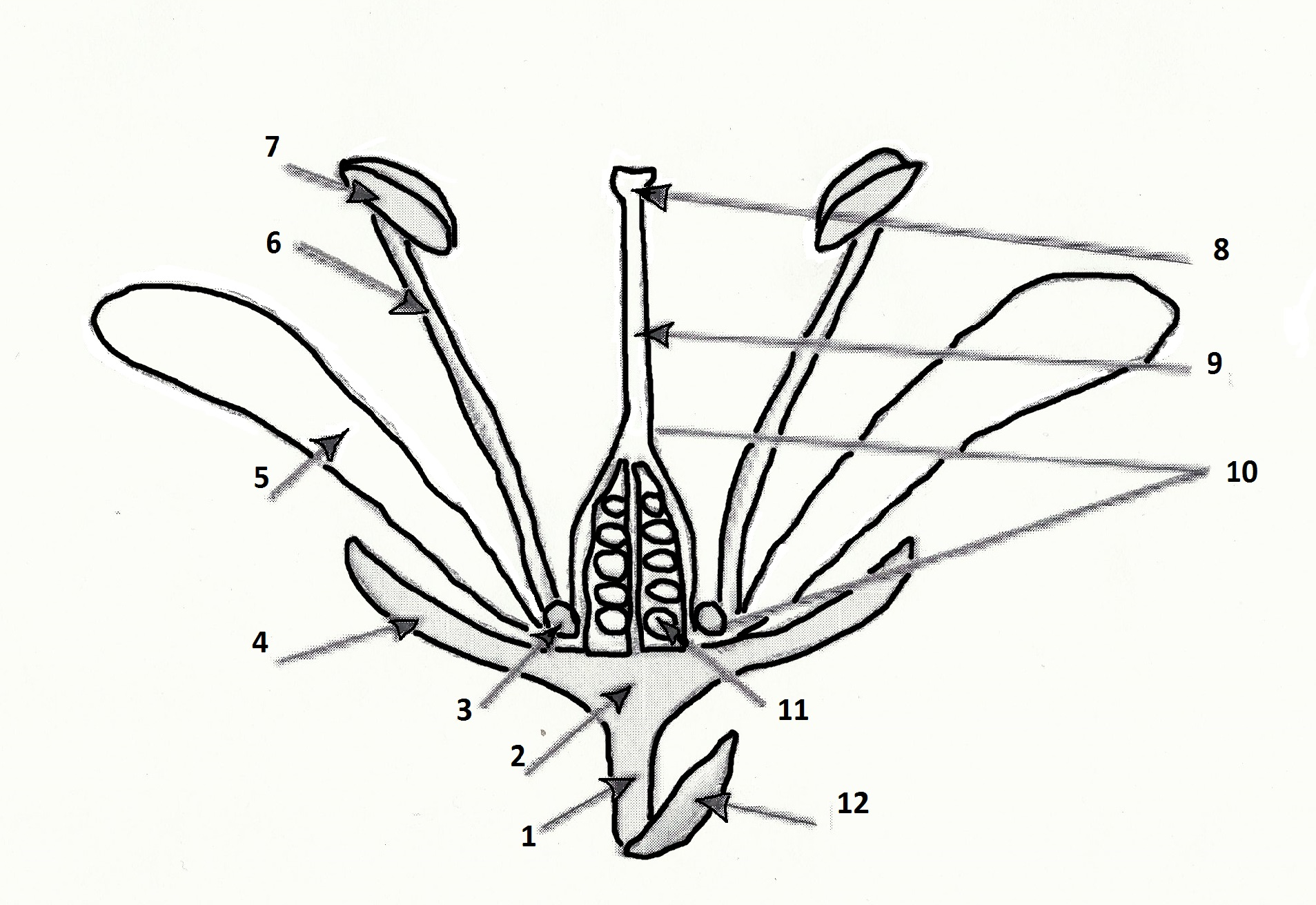
1: Pedicel 2: Receptacle 3: Nectary 4: Sepal 5: Petal 6: Filament 7: Anther 8: Stigma 9: Style 10: Ovary 11: Ovule 12: Bract

The flower, which is one of the defining features of angiosperms, is essentially a stem whose leaf primordia become specialised, following which the apical meristem stops growing: a determinate growth pattern, in contrast to vegetative stems. The flower stem is known as a pedicel, and those flowers with such a stem are called pedicellate, while those without are called sessile. In the angiosperms, the flowers are arranged on a flower stem as an inflorescence. Just beneath (subtended) the flower there may be a modified, and usually reduced, leaf, called a bract. A secondary smaller bract is a bracteole (bractlet, prophyll, prophyllum), often on the side of the pedicel, and generally paired. A series of bracts subtending the calyx (see below) is an epicalyx. Angiosperms are dealt with in more detail here; these structures are very different in gymnosperms.

In angiosperms, the specialised leaves that play a part in reproduction are arranged around the stem in an ordered fashion, from the base to the apex of the flower. The floral parts are arranged at the end of a stem without any internodes. The receptacle (also called the floral axis, or thalamus) is generally very small. Some flower parts are solitary, while others may form a tight spiral, or whorl, around the flower stem. First, at the base, are those non-reproductive structures involved in protecting the flower when it is still a bud, the sepals, then are those parts that play a role in attracting pollinators and are typically coloured, the petals, which together with the sepals make up the perianth (perigon, perigonium). If the perianth is differentiated, the outer whorl of sepals forms the calyx, and the inner whorl of petals, the corolla. If the perianth is not differentiated into sepals and petals, they are collectively known as tepals. In some flowers, a tube or cup-like hypanthium (floral tube) is formed above or around the ovary and bears the sepals, petals, and stamens. There may also be a nectary producing nectar. Nectaries may develop on or in the perianth, receptacle, androecium (stamens), or gynoecium. In some flowers nectar may be produced on nectariferous disks. Disks may arise from the receptacle and are doughnut- or disk-shaped. They may also surround the stamens (extrastaminal), be at the stamen bases (staminal), or be inside the stamina (intrastaminal).

===== Reproductive structures =====
Finally, the actual reproductive parts form the innermost layers of the flower. These leaf primordia become specialised as sporophylls, leaves that form areas called sporangia, which produce spores, and cavitate internally. The sporangia on the sporophytes of pteridophytes are visible, but those of gymnosperms and angiosperms are not. In the angiosperms there are two types. Some form male organs (stamens), the male sporangia (microsporangia) producing microspores. Others form female organs (carpels), the female sporangia (megasporangia) producing a single large megaspore. These in turn produce the male gametophytes and female gametophytes

These two components are the androecium and gynoecium, respectively. The androecium (literally, men's house) is a collective term for the male organs (stamens or microsporophylls). While sometimes leaflike (laminar), more commonly they consist of a long thread-like column, the filament, surmounted by a pollen bearing anther. The anther usually consists of two fused thecae. A theca is two microsporangia. The gynoecium (women's house) is the collective term for the female organs (carpels). A carpel is a modified megasporophyll consisting of two or more ovules, which develop conduplicatively (folded along the line). The carpels may be single, or collected together, to form an ovary, and contain the ovules. Another term, pistil, refers to the ovary as its expanded base, the style, a column arising from the ovary, and an expanded tip, the stigma.

Within the stamen, the microsporangium forms grains of pollen, surrounded by a protective microspore, which form the male gametophyte. Within the carpel the megasporangium form the ovules, with its protective layers (integument) in the megaspore, and the female gametophyte. Unlike the male gametophyte, which is transported in the pollen, the female gametophyte remains within the ovule.

Most flowers have both male and female organs, and hence are considered bisexual (perfect), which is thought to be the ancestral state. However, others have either one or the other and are therefore unisexual, or imperfect. In which case they may be either male (staminate) or female (carpellate). Plants may bear either all bisexual flowers (hermaphroditic), both male and female flowers (monoecious), or only one sex (dioecious), in which case separate plants are either male or female flower-bearing. Where both bisexual and unisexual flowers exist on the same plant, it is called polygamous. Polygamous plants may have bisexual and staminate flowers (andromonoecious), bisexual and pistillate flowers (gynomonoecious), or both (trimonoecious). Other combinations include the presence of bisexual flowers on some individual plants and staminate on others (androdioecious), or bisexual and carpellate (gynodioecious). Finally, trioecious plants have bisexual, staminate, or carpellate flowers on different individuals. Arrangements other than hermaphroditic help to ensure outcrossing.

===== Fertilisation and embryogenesis =====
The development of the embryo and gametophytes is called embryology. The study of pollens which persist in soil for many years is called palynology. Reproduction occurs when male and female gametophytes interact. This generally requires an external agent such as wind or insects to carry the pollen from the stamen to the vicinity of the ovule. This process is called pollination. In gymnosperms (literally naked seed) pollen comes into direct contact with the exposed ovule. In angiosperms the ovule is enclosed in the carpel, requiring a specialised structure, the stigma, to receive the pollen. On the surface of the stigma, the pollen germinates; that is, the male gametophyte penetrates the pollen wall into the stigma, and a pollen tube, an extension of the pollen grain, extends towards the carpel, carrying with it the sperm cells (male gametes) until they encounter the ovule, where they gain access through a pore in the ovule's integument (micropyle), allowing fertilisation to occur. Once the ovule has been fertilised, a new sporophyte, protected and nurtured by the female gametophyte, develops and becomes an embryo. When development stops, the embryo becomes dormant, as a seed. Within the embryo are the primordial shoot and root.

In angiosperms, as the seed develops after fertilisation, so does the surrounding carpel, its walls thickening or hardening, developing colours or nutrients that attract animals or birds. This new entity with its dormant seeds is the fruit, whose functions are protecting the seed and dispersing it. In some cases, androecium and gynaecium may be fused. The resulting structure is a gynandrium (gynostegium, gynostemium, or column), which is supported by an androgynosphore.

=== Vegetative morphology ===
- Ptyxis – the way in which an individual leaf is folded within an unopened bud.
- Vernation – the arrangement of leaves in an unopened bud.

==== Roots ====
Plants, with regard to identification and classification, are not often characterized by their roots, which are important in determining plant duration. However, in some groups, including the grasses, roots are important for proper identification.

- Adventitious – roots that form from other than the hypocotyl or from other roots. Roots forming on the stem are adventitious.
- Aerial – roots growing in the air.
- (Root) crown – the place where the roots and stem meet, which may or may not be clearly visible.
- Fibrous – describes roots that are thread-like and normally tough.
- Fleshy – describes roots that are relatively thick and soft, normally made up of storage tissue. Roots are typically long and thick but not thickly rounded in shape.
- Haustorial – specialized roots that invade other plants and absorb nutrients from those plants.
- Lignotuber – root tissue that allows plants to regenerate after fire or other damage.
- Primary – root that develop from the radicle of the embryo, and is normally the first root to emerge from the seed as it germinates.
- Root Hairs – very small roots, often one cell wide, that do most of the water and nutrient absorption.
- Secondary – roots forming off of the primary root; often called branch roots.
- Taproot – a primary root that more-or-less enlarges and grows downward into the soil.
- Tuberous – roots that are thick and soft with storage tissue, and are typically thick and round in shape.

===== Root structure terms =====
- Epiblema – Outermost (epidermal) layer of rootlets. Normally 1-cell-layer thick (uniseriate). Normally do not have a cuticle, and permit water conduction.
- Quiescent centre – a small region inside the root's apical region that has a slower division rate.
- Root Cap – a cover or cap-like structure that protects the tip of root.
  - Multiple root caps - several layers of root caps on a single root apex; seen in Pandanus sp.
  - Root Pocket – a cap-like structure on the root-apex of some aquatic plants, which, unlike root-caps, doesn't reappear if removed somehow.
- Root hair – fine cellular appendages from cells of epiblema. They are unicellular, which means one root hair and corresponding cell of epiblema comprise only 1 cell. By contrast, stem and leaf hairs can be unicellular or multicellular. Root hairs of older portions of roots are destroyed over time, and only at a certain region near a growing apex (called the root-hair-region) are root hairs seen. Although microscopic, root-hairs can be observed by the unaided eye in chili and Brassica seedlings.

===== Terms classifying roots and their modifications =====
- Tap-Root-System:
  - Storage roots:
    - Conical root – Storage root that is broad at its base (upper portion) and gradually tapers to its apex (lower portion): e.g., Carrot.
    - Fusiform root – Storage root that is swollen in the centre and tapers towards both apex and base: e.g., radish (Raphanus sativus).
    - Napiform root – Root whose upper (basal) portion is heavily swollen but whose lower (apical) portion is narrow and tapering: e.g., beet, turnip.
    - Tuberous or tubercular tap-root – In its narrow sense, a tap-root that is thick and fleshy (due to storage) but that does not conform to the fusiform, conical, napiform shape: Mirabilis jalapa. In its broader sense, a tap-root that is thick and fleshy (due to storage); i.e. when tuberation take place in a tap-root.
  - Pneumatophores (respiratory roots) – Part of tap-root system as respiratory roots; found in many mangrove trees. They arise from the thick, mature branches of tap-root systems, and grow upwards. The inner tissue of respiratory roots is full of hollow, airy, tube-like dead cells, giving it a spongy texture. The outer surface of pneumatophores contains tiny pores or openings, which are called pneumathodes: e.g., Heritiera fomes, Rhizophora mucronata. Pneumatophores can be unbranched or sparingly branched.
  - Vivipary – This is a feature of many mangrove trees, where the seed germinates when the seed (and fruit) remain joined to the mother plant until the radicle and hypocotyl grow, reach the ground, and establish there.

(See also: seeds and germination related sections and articles)

- Adventitious root systems
  - Fibrous root – Originate from the base of a young stem and replace the primary root (and also from the stem nodes, and sometimes internodes), and emanate as a parallel cluster or bunch from around the node. The adventitious roots of monocots are usually of this type. Replacement of a tap root system by a fibrous root is seen in onions, tuberose (Polyanthes tuberosa), grasses, etc. Fibrous roots from normal-stem nodes are seen in grasses like maize, sugarcane, bamboo, etc. Fibrous roots from nodes help in the survival of the plant and thus in vegetative reproduction, when the plant's base is damaged or cut inside the stem axis.
  - Many dicots, too, release adventitious toots from stem-nodes, especially those that can regenerate vegetatively (Hibiscus rosa-sinensis, Coleus, etc.) and those that have a weak stem with creeping habit (Centella asiatica, Bacopa monnieri, etc.). These roots are called adventitious, not fibrous, roots.
  - Adventitious storage roots – similar function as storage-taproots.
    - Tuberous roots or root tubers – Narrow sense, those storage roots that do not conform to a specific shape, such as fasciculated, nodulose moniliform, annulated, etc.: e.g. sweet potato (Ipomoea batatas), whose edible part is a root of this type. Broader sense, adventitious roots swollen due to their storage function.
    - Fasciculated root – When several tubercular roots grow as a parallel bunch or bundle. Seen in Dahlia sp., Ruellia tuberosa, Asparagus racemosus, etc. Orchis maculata have a pair of bulbous storage-roots.
    - Nodulose root – Not to be confused with root-nodules. Storage pattern is a root axis swollen near the apical portion, thus forming a bulbous or tuberous structure at or near the root tip. It is commonly seen associated with a rhizomatous stem. It is seen in Costus speciosus, Curcuma amada, Curcuma domestica, Asparagus sprengeri, Arrowroot (Maranta), etc. and some species of Calathea.
    - Moniliform or Beaded root – When more than one swelling, or nodule-like, structures occur at intervals along the root axis. Such an alternating swollen-and-constricted pattern is seen in Cyperus sp., Dioscorea alata, Vitis trifolia, Portulaca sp., Basella sp., Momordica sp. and some grasses.
    - Annulated root – Like moniliform roots, annulated roots also contain alternating swollen and constricted regions; but here the length of constricted regions is so short that the root appears as a stack of discs. It is seen in Cephalis ipecacuanha (Rubiaceae).
  - Floating or Aquatic-respiratory root – The upright, spongy structures helps the plant to float. Seen in Jussiaea repens.
  - Epiphytic root – This type of root seen in epiphytic orchids. The thick root hangs from the plant's base directly into air. The root is covered with a special, usually 4- to 5-cell layer thick, spongy tissue (called Velamen), which helps the plant to absorb moisture from the atmosphere. Epiphytic orchid have another sort of root, called clinging roots, that help the orchid plant cling to the substratum (host). Since a similar function is seen in many other plants' adventitious roots, it is being mentioned in more general terms in the mechanical advancements section.
  - Parasitic root or Haustoria –
  - Assimilatory or Photosynthetic roots –
  - Mechanical advancements –
    - Prop-roots – In some dome-shaped (deliquescent) trees, from the mature horizontal boughs (stem-branches) some quite thick (millimeters to centimeters) roots come down. After growing and reaching the ground, they establish more elaborate root branches as well as show massive secondary thickening. Thus, they start to resemble the main trunk. Besides carrying the weight of horizontal boughs, when the main trunk is destroyed due to ageing or accident, the established prop-roots support the remaining plant-body, thus helping in vegetative reproduction. E.g. Ficus benghalensis. The Great Banyan Tree at IBG Kolkata is an example how prop-roots help in vegetative reproduction.
    - Stilt roots – From upright (erect) trunks, some hard, thick, almost straight roots come-out obliquely and penetrate the ground. Thus they act like a camera-tripod. They increase balance and support as well as, when these roots penetrates the ground, they increase soil grip.
    - Root-Buttress or Plank Buttress or Buttress-Root –
    - Climbing roots –
    - Clinging roots –
    - Contractile-roots or Pull-roots –
    - Haptera – root-like projections found in macroalgae or lichens that anchor the organism to a rocky substrate.
  - Protective functions –
    - Root-thorns –
  - Reproductive roots – These roots contain root-buds and actively take part in shoot-regeneration, and thus in vegetative reproduction. This is an unusual feature because roots normally do not contain buds.
Gallery: Roots specialized for mechanical function.
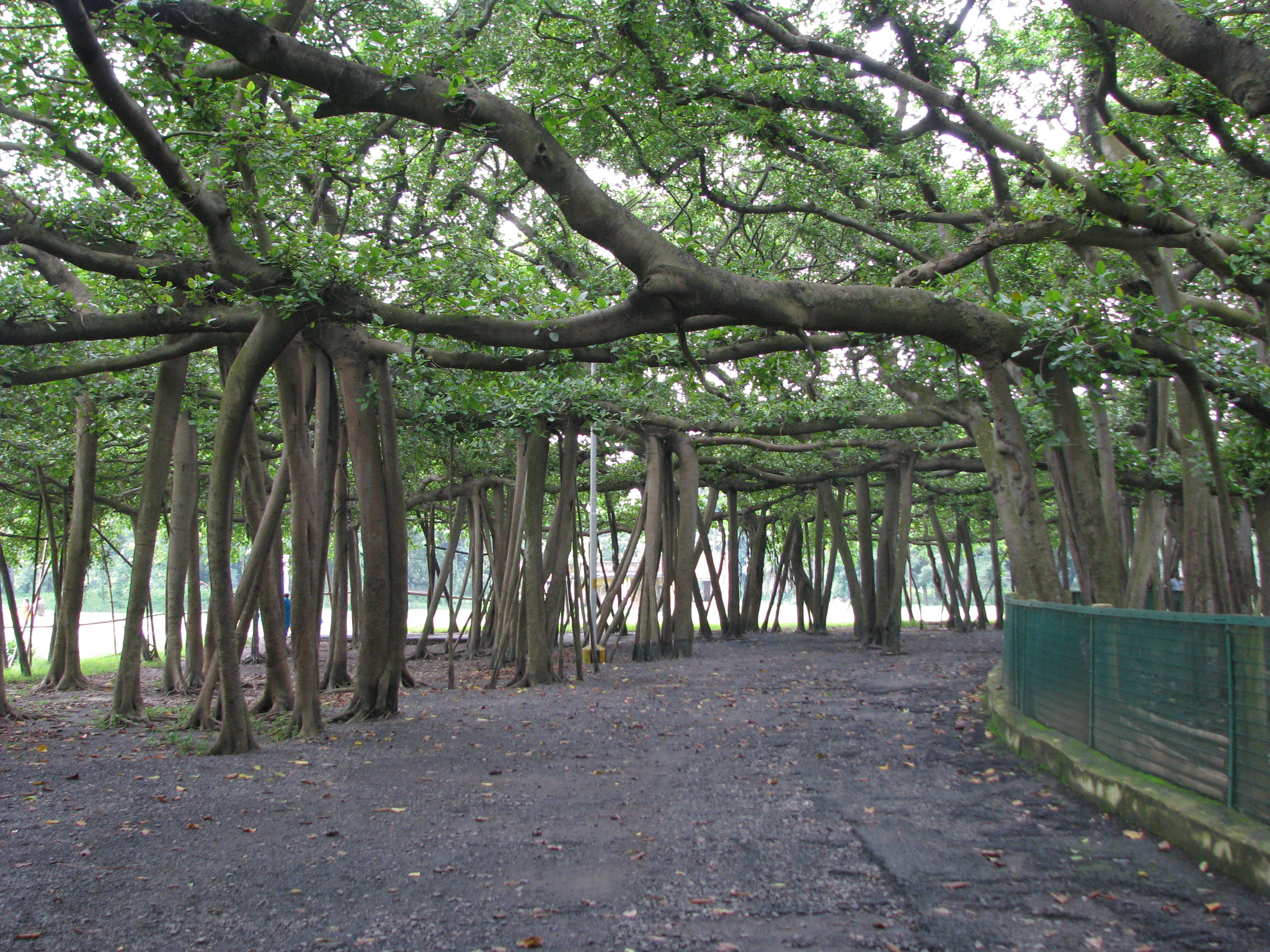
Prop roots in Ficus benghalensis in Indian Botanic Garden.

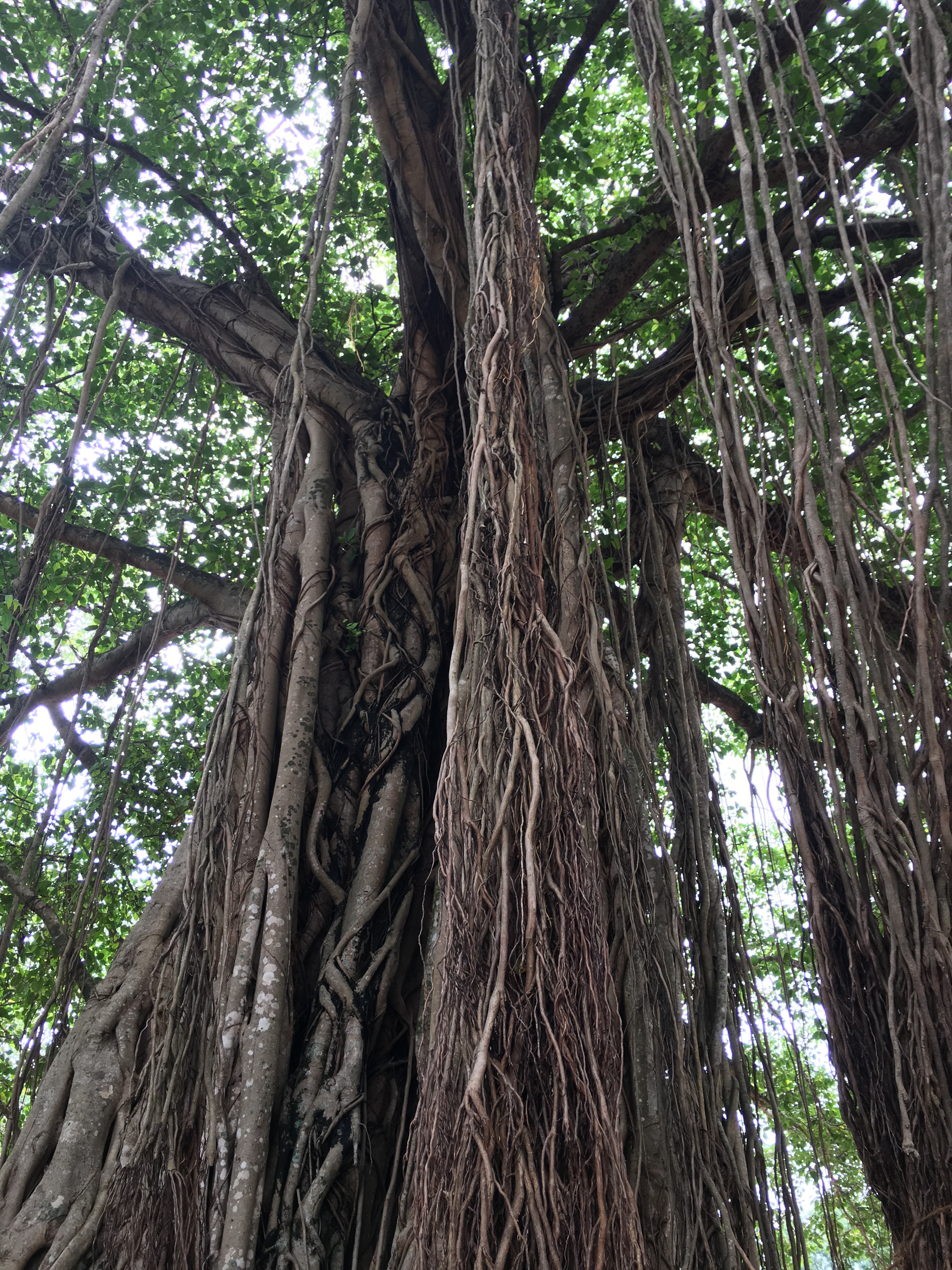
Ficus benghalensis prop roots

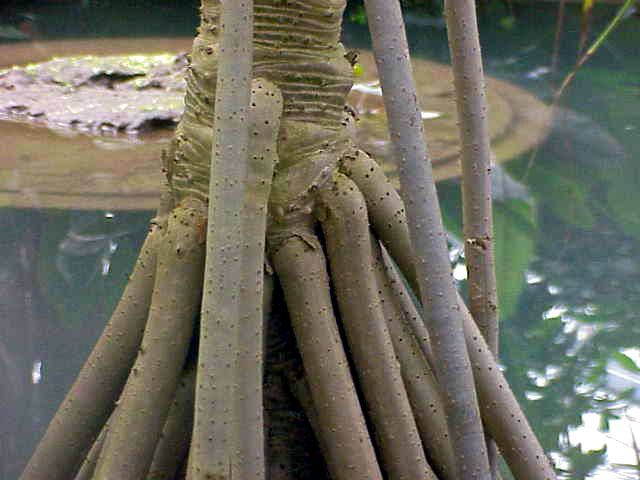
Stilt roots in Pandanus sp.

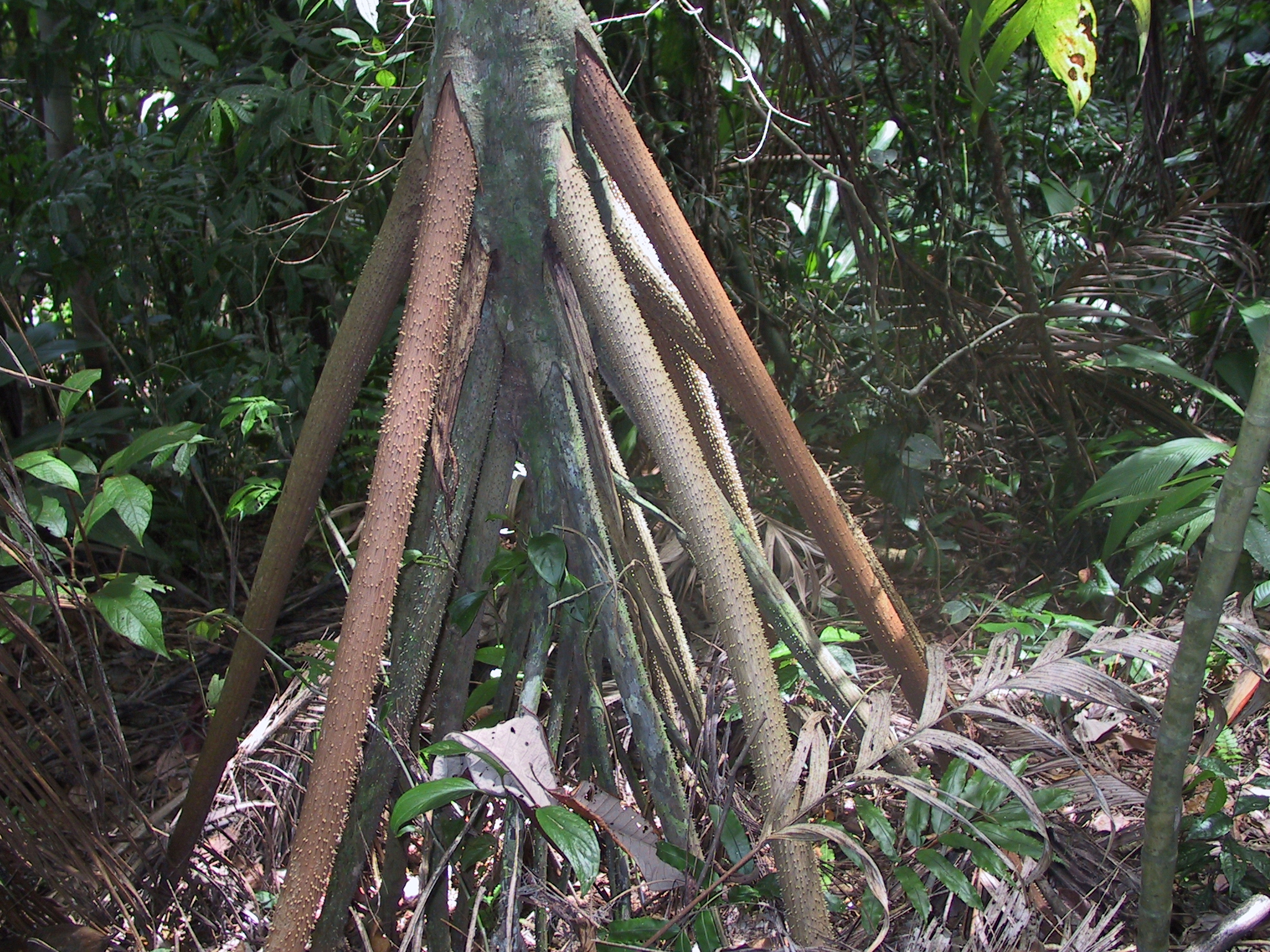
Stilt roots in Socratea exorrhiza palm

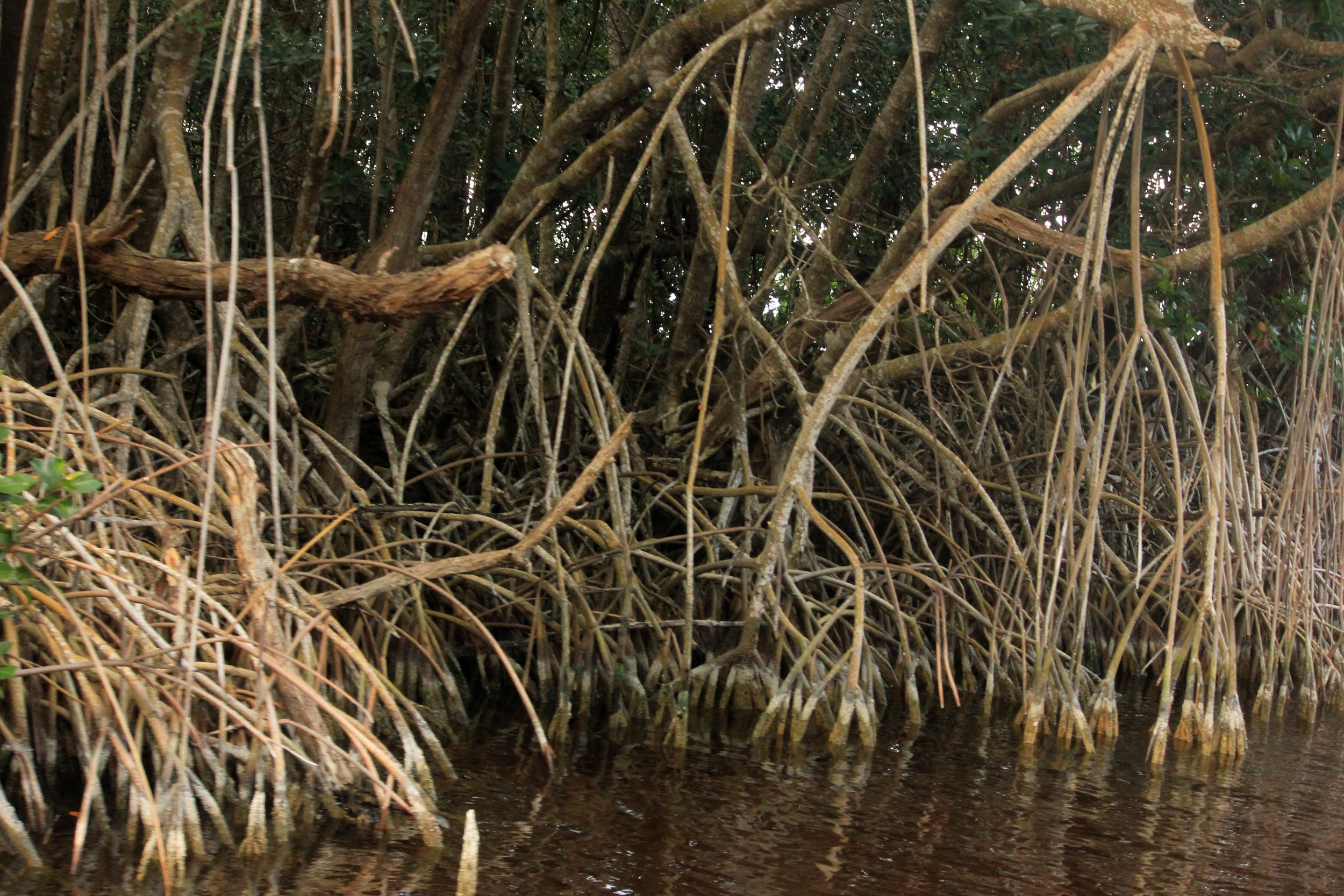
Stilt-roots in mangrove plants

==== Stems ====
Parts of plant stem

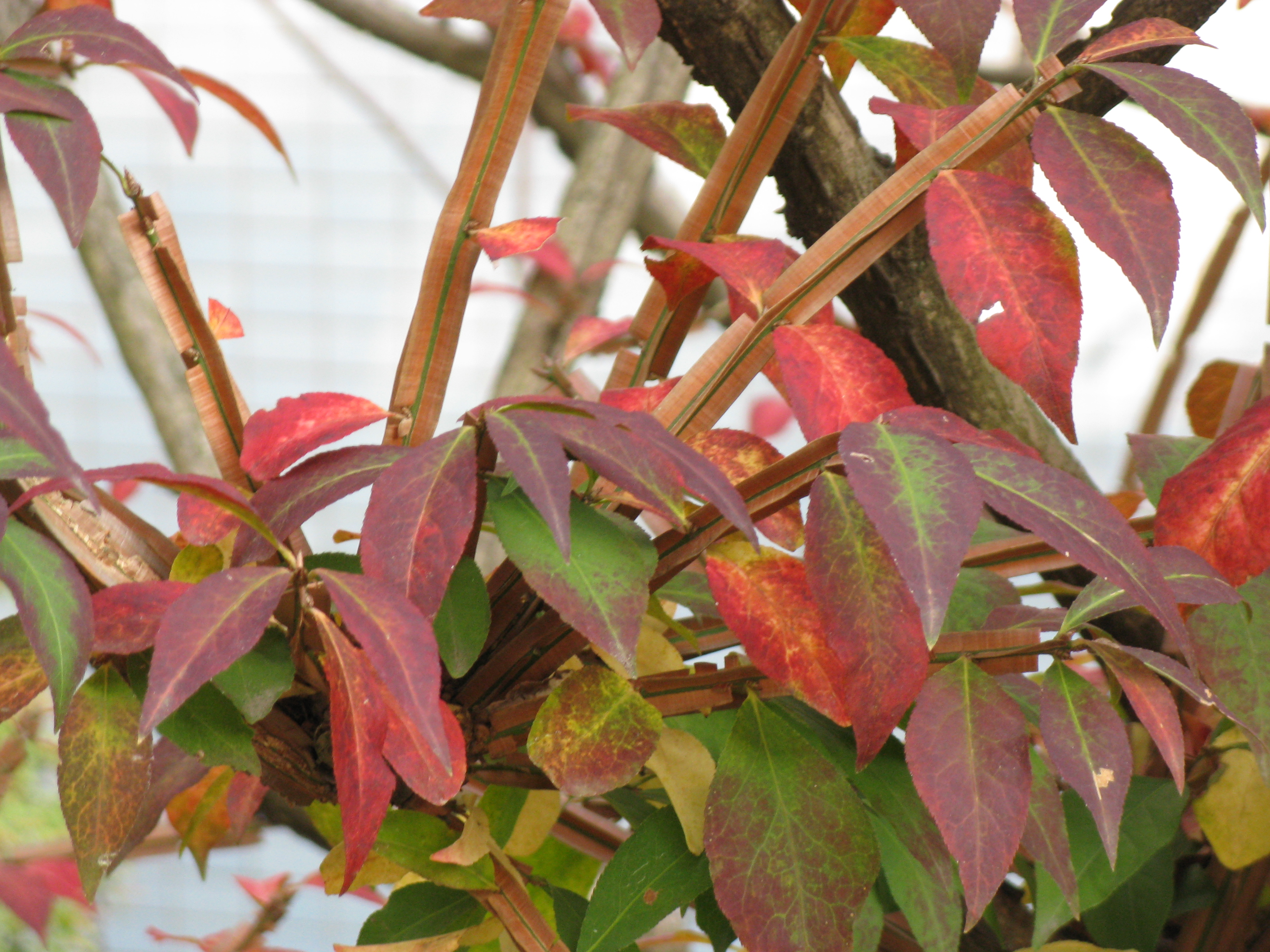
Euonymus alata, an example of alate stems

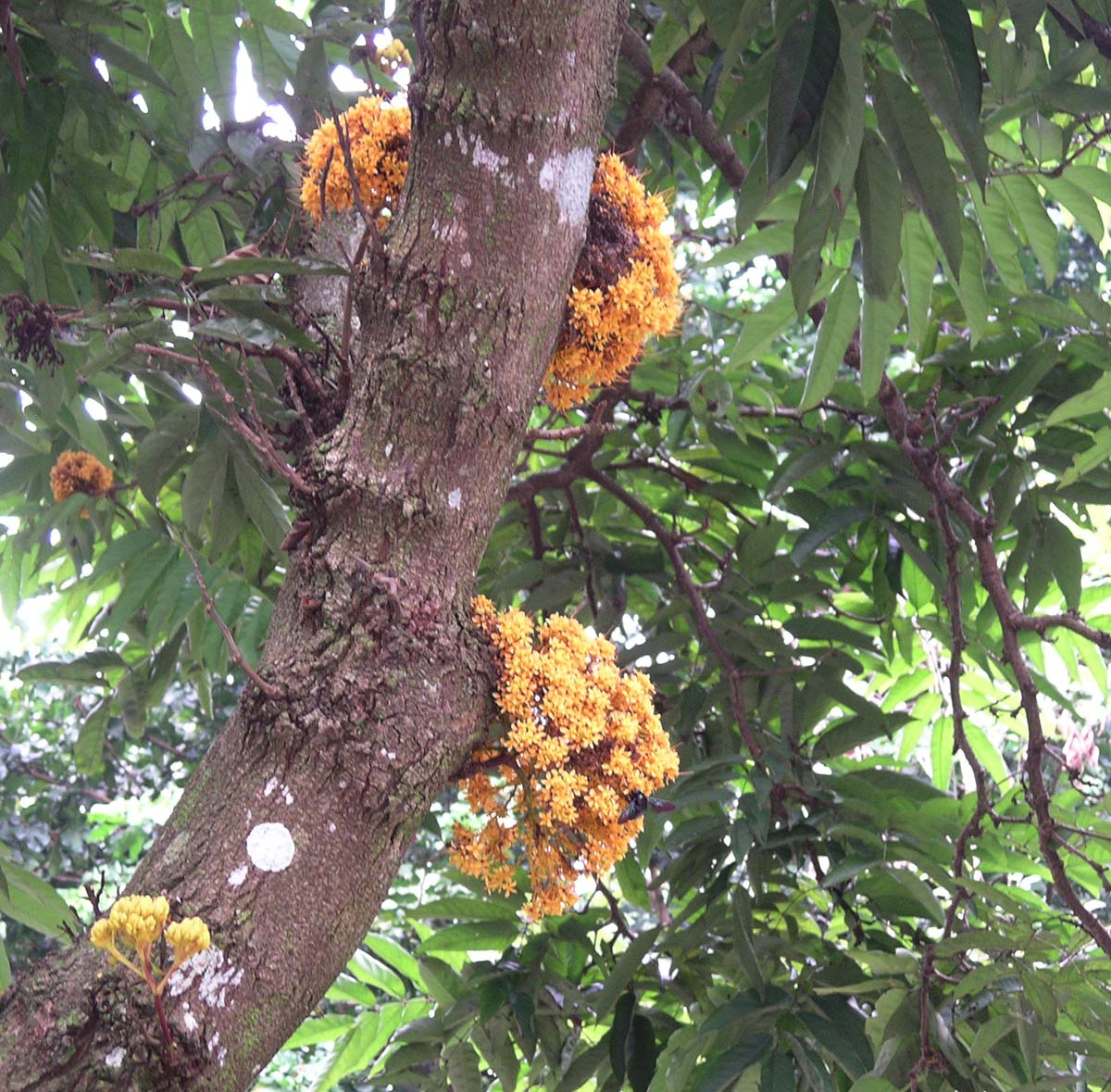
Saraca cauliflora, an example of cauliflora

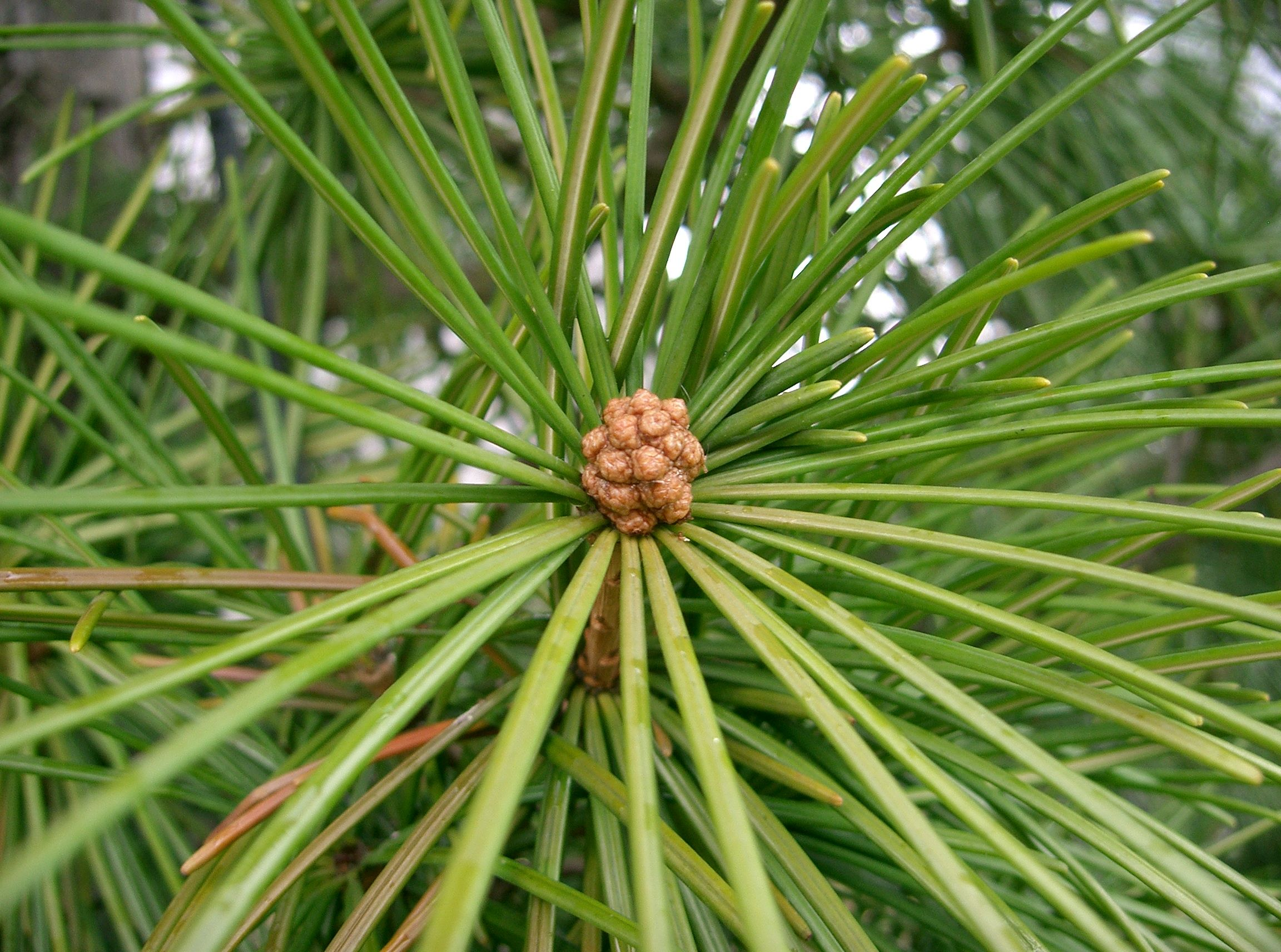
Sciadopitys verticillata, an example of a verticillate plant

- Accessory buds – an embryonic shoot occurring above or to the side of an axillary bud; also known as supernumerary bud.
- Acrocarpous – produced at the end of a branch.
- Acutangular – a stem that has several longitudinally running ridges with sharp edges.
- Adventitious buds – a bud that arises at points on the plant other than at the stem apex or leaf axil.
- Alate – having wing-like structures, usually on the seeds or stems, as in Euonymus alata.
- Alternate – buds are staggered on opposite sides of the branch.
- Bark – the outer layers of woody plants: cork, phloem, and vascular cambium.
- Branches –
- Bud – an immature stem tip, typically an embryonic shoot, either producing a stem, leaves, or flowers.
- Bulb – an underground stem normally with a short basal surface and with thick fleshy leaves.
- Bundle scar – a small mark on a leaf scar indicating a point where a vein from the leaf was once connected to the stem.
- Caudex – the hard base produced by herbaceous perennials, which serves in overwintering the plant.
- Caulescent – with a distinctive stem.
- Cauliflora – with the flowers and fruit on the stem, or trunk, as in Saraca cauliflora.
- Cladode – a flattened stem that performs the function of a leaf; an example is the pad of the opuntia cactus.
- Cladophyll – a flattened stem that is leaf-like and green – used for photosynthesis. Normally such plants have no, or greatly reduced, leaves.
- Climbing – typically long stems that cling to other objects.
- Corm – a compact, upright-orientated stem that is bulb-like, with hard or fleshy texture, and normally covered by papery, thin, dry leaves. Most often produced under the soil surface.
- Cuticle – a waterproof waxy membrane covering leaves and primary shoots.
- Decumbent – stems that lie on the ground but whose ends turn upward.
- Dormant – a state of no, or reduced, growth
- Earlywood – the portion of the annual growth ring that is formed early in the season.
- Epidermis – a layer of cells that cover all primary tissue, separating it from the outside environment.
- Erect – growing upright.
- Flower bud – a bud from which only flowers develop
- Fruticose – woody stemmed with a shrub-like habit. Branching near the soil with woody based stems.
- Guard cell – one of the paired epidermal cells that control the opening and closing of a stoma in plant tissue.
- Heartwood – the older, nonliving central wood of a tree or woody plant, usually darker and harder than the younger sapwood. Also called duramen.
- Herbaceous – non-woody and dying to the ground at the end of the growing season. Annual plants die, while perennials regrow from parts on the soil surface, or below ground, the next growing season.
- Internode – space between nodes.
- Latent buds – axillary buds whose development is inhibited, sometimes for many years, due to the influence of apical and other buds. Also known as dormant buds.
- Lateral buds – a bud located on the side of the stem, usually in a leaf axil.
- Late wood – the portion of the annual ring that is formed after the formation of earlywood has ceased.
- Leaf – the photosynthetic organ of a plant that is attached to a stem, generally at specific intervals.
- Leaf axils – the space created between a leaf and its branch. This is especially pronounced on monocots like the bromeliads.
- Leaf buds – buds that produces leafy shoots.
- Leaf scar – the mark left on a branch from the previous location of a bud or leaf.
- Lenticel – One of the small, corky pores or narrow lines, on the surface of the stems of woody plants, that allow for the interchange of gases between the interior tissue and the surrounding air.
- Node – where leaves and buds are attached to the stem.
- Opposite – buds that are arranged in pairs on opposite sides of the branch
- Orthotropic growth – growth in the vertical direction.
- Pith – the spongy tissue at the center of a stem.
- Chambered pith – a form of pith in which the parenchyma collapses or is torn during development, leaving the sclerenchyma plates to alternate with hollow zones
- Diaphragmed pith – pith in which plates or nests of sclerenchyma may be interspersed with the parenchyma.
- Plagiotropic growth – growth inclined away from the vertical, inclined towards the horizontal.
- Pore –
- Prickle – an extension of the cortex and epidermis that ends with a sharp point.
- Prostrate – growing flat on the soil surface.
- Rhizome – a horizontally orientated, prostrate stem with reduced scale-like leaves, normally growing under ground but also on the soil surface. Also produced by some species that grow in trees or water.
- Rootstock – the underground part of a plant normally referring to a caudex or rhizome.
- Runner – an above-ground stem, usually rooting and producing new plants at the nodes.
- Sapwood –
- Scandent – a stem that climbs.
- Spine – an adapted leaf that is usually hard and sharp and is used for protection, and occasionally shading, of the plant
- Stem – vascular tissue that provides support for the plant,
- Stolon – a horizontally growing stem similar to a rhizome, produced near the base of the plant. They spread out above or along the soil surface. Roots and new plants develop at the nodes or ends.
- Stoloniferous – a plant that produces stolons.
- Stoma – a small pore on the surface of the leaves used for gas exchange with the environment while preventing water loss.
- Suberose – having a corky texture.
- Tendril – a thigmotropic organ which attaches a climbing plant to a support, a portion of a stem or leaf modified to serve as a holdfast for other objects.
- Terminal – at the end of a stalk or stem.
- Terminal scale bud scar –
- Thorn –
- Tiller – a shoot of a grass plant.
- Tuber – an enlarged stem or root that stores nutrients.
- Turgid – swollen.
- Twigs –
- Vascular bundles – a strand of woody fibers and associated tissues.
- Verticillate/Verticil/Verticillatus – leaves or flowers arranged in whorls; said of a collection of three or more leaves or flowers that arise from the same point.

==== Buds ====
- Accessory bud – an embryonic shoot occurring above or to the side of an axillary bud; also known as supernumerary bud.
- Adventitious bud – a bud that arises at a point on the plant other than at the stem apex or a leaf axil.
- Axillary – an embryonic shoot which lies at the junction of the stem and petiole of a plant.
- Dormant – see "Latent bud".
- Epicormic – vegetative buds that lie dormant beneath the bark, shooting after crown disturbance
- Flower bud –
- Lateral –
- Latent bud – an axillary bud whose development is inhibited, sometimes for many years, due to the influence of apical and other buds. Also known as a dormant bud.
- Leaf bud – a bud that produces a leafy shoot.
- Mixed – buds that have both embryonic flowers and leaves.
- Naked –
- Pseudoterminal –
- Reproductive – buds with embryonic flowers.
- Scaly –
- Terminal – bud at the tip or end of the stem.
- Vegetative – buds containing embryonic leaves.

==== Leaves ====
Leaf morphology: Shape, margin and venation.

Leaf Parts: – A complete leaf is composed of a blade, petiole, and stipules, but in many plants one or more might be lacking or highly modified.

- Blade – see lamina.
- Lamina – the flat and laterally-expanded portion of a leaf blade.
- Leaflet – a separate blade, among others, of a compound leaf
- Ligule – a projection from the top of the sheath on the adaxial side of the sheath-blade joint in grasses.
- Midrib – the central vein of the leaf blade.
- Midvein – the central vein of a leaflet.
- Petiole – a leaf stalk supporting a blade and attaching to a stem at a node.
- Petiolule - the leaf stalk of a leaflet.
- Pulvinus – the swollen base of a petiole or petiolule, usually involved in leaf movements and leaf orientation.
- Rachilla – a secondary axis of a multiply compound leaf.
- Rachis – main axis of a pinnately compound leaf.
- Sheath – the proximal portion of a grass leaf, usually surrounding the stem.
- Stipels – paired scales, spines, glands, or blade-like structures at the base of a petiolule.
- Stipules – paired scales, spines, glands, or blade-like structures at the base of a petiole.
- Stipuloid – resembling stipules.

Duration of leaves:

- Deciduous – leaves are shed after the growing season.
- Evergreen – leaves are retained throughout the year, sometimes for several years.
- Fugacious – lasting for a short time: soon falling away from the parent plant.
- Marcescent – dead leaves, calyx, or petals are persistent and retained.
- Persistent – see Marcescence.

Venation:

- Acrodromous – the veins run parallel to the leaf edge and fuse at the leaf tip.
- Actinodromous – the main veins of a leaf radiate from the tip of the petiole.
- Brochidodromous – the veins turn away from the leaf edge to join the next higher vein.
- Campylodromous – secondary veins diverge at the base of the lamina and rejoin at the tip.
- Craspedodromous – secondary veins run straight to the leaf edge and end there.
  - Furcate – forked, dividing into two divergent branches.
- Reticulate – veins interconnected to form a network. Net-veined.
- Vein – the externally visible vascular bundles found on leaves, petals, and other parts.
- Veinlet – a small vein.

Leaf Arrangement or Phyllotaxy:

- Whorl – three or more leaves or branches or pedicels arising from the same node.

Leaf Type:

- Abruptly pinnate – a compound leaf without a terminal leaflet.

Leaf Blade Shape:

- Acicular (acicularis) – slender and pointed, needle-like.
- Acuminate (acuminata) – tapering to a long point.
- Aristate (aristata) – ending in a stiff, bristle-like point.
- Bipinnate (bipinnata) – each leaflet also pinnate.
- Cordate (cordata) – heart-shaped, stem attaches to cleft.
- Cuneate (cuneata) – triangular, stem attaches to point.
- Deltoid (deltoidea) – triangular, stem attaches to side.
- Digitate (digitata) – divided into finger-like lobes.
- Elliptic (elliptica) – oval, with a short or no point.
- Falcate (falcata) – sickle-shaped.
- Flabellate (flabellata) – semi-circular, or fan-like.
- Hastate (hastata) – shaped like a spear point, with flaring pointed lobes at the base.
- Lance-shaped, lanceolate (lanceolata) – long, wider in the middle.
- Linear (linearis) – long and very narrow.
- Lobed (lobata) – with several points.
- Obcordate (obcordata) – heart-shaped, stem attaches to tapering point.
- Oblanceolate (oblanceolata) – top wider than bottom.
- Oblong (oblongus) – having an elongated form with slightly parallel sides.
- Obovate (obovata) – teardrop-shaped, stem attaches to tapering point.
- Obtuse (obtusus) – with a blunt tip.
- Orbicular (orbicularis) – circular.
- Ovate (ovata) – Oval, egg-shaped, with a tapering point.
- Palmate (palmata) – divided into many lobes.
- Pedate (pedata) – palmate, with cleft lobes.
- Peltate (peltata) – rounded, stem underneath.
- Perfoliate (perfoliata) – stem through the leaves.
- Pinnate (pinnata) – two rows of leaflets.
  - odd-pinnate – pinnate with a terminal leaflet.
  - paripinnate, even-pinnate – pinnate lacking a terminal leaflet.
- Pinnatisect (pinnatifida) – cut, but not to the midrib (it would be pinnate then).
- Reniform (reniformis) – kidney-shaped.
- Rhomboid (rhomboidalis) – diamond-shaped.
- Round (rotundifolia) – circular.
- Sagittate (sagittata) – arrowhead-shaped.
- Spatulate, spathulate (spathulata) – spoon-shaped.
- Spear-shaped (hastata) – pointed, with barbs.
- Subulate (subulata) – awl-shaped with a tapering point.
- Sword-shaped (ensiformis) – long, thin, pointed.
- Trifoliate, ternate (or trifoliolate) (trifoliata) – divided into three leaflets.
- Tripinnate (tripinnata) – pinnately compound in which each leaflet is itself bipinnate.
- Truncate (truncata) – with a squared off end.
- Unifoliate (unifoliata) – with a single leaf.

Leaf Base Shape:

- Semiamplexicaul – the leaf base wraps around the stem, but not completely.

Leaf Blade Apex:

- Acuminate – narrowing to a point (a term used for other structures, too).
- Acute – with a sharp, rather abrupt ending-point.
  - Acutifolius – with acute leaves.
- Attenuate – tapering gradually to a narrow end.

Leaf Blade Margins:

- Crenulate – with shallow, small rounded teeth.

=== Epidermis and periderm texture ===
- Acanceous – prickly.
- Acantha – a prickle or spine.
- Acanthocarpus – fruits are spiny.
- Acanthocladous – branches are spiny.
- Aculeate – having a covering of prickles or needle-like growth.
  - Aculeolate – having spine-like processes.
- Aden – a gland.
  - Adenoid – gland-like.
  - Adenophore – a stalk that supports a gland.
  - Adenophyllous – leaves with glands.
- Arachnoid – having entangled hairs that resemble cobwebs.
- Bloom – waxy coating that covers some plants.
- Canescent – with gray pubescence.
- Ciliate – with a fringe of marginal hairs.
- Coriaceouse – with a tough or leathery texture.
- Fimbriate – finely cut into fringes, the edge of a frilly petal or leaf.
- Floccose –
- Glabrate –
- Glabrous – smooth without any pubescences at all.
- Glandular –
- Glandular-punctate – covered across the surface with glands.
- Hirsute – with long shaggy hairs, often stiff or bristly to the touch.
- Lanate – with thick wool-like hairs.
- Verrucose – with a warty surface having low rounded bumps.
- Villose – covered with fine, long hairs that are not matted.
  - Villosity – villous indument.

=== Floral morphology ===
- Accrescent – growing larger after anthesis, normally referring to the calyx.
- Anthesis – the period when the flower is fully open and functional, ending when the stigma or stamens wither.

==== Basic flower parts ====
===== Androecium =====
- Androecium – the stamens collectively.
  - Basifixed – attached by the base.
  - Connective – the part of the stamen joining the anther cells.
  - Diadelphous – united by filaments to form two groups.
  - Didynamous – having four stamens in two pairs of unequal length.
  - Epipetalous – borne on the corolla, often used in reference to stamens attached to the corolla.
  - Exserted – sticking out past the corolla, the stamens protrude past the margin of the corolla lip.
  - Extrose – opening towards the outside of the flower.
  - Gynandrium – combined male and female structure.
  - Gynostegium – adnation of stamens and the style and stigma (Orchidaceae).
  - Included –
  - Introrse – opening on the inside of the corolla, the stamens are contained within the margins of the petals.
  - Monadelphous – stamen filaments united as a tube.
  - Poricidal – anthers opening through terminal pores.
  - Staminode – a sterile stamen.
    - Staminodial – (1) concerning a sterile stamen; (2) flowers with sterile stamens.
  - Synandrous – anthers are connected (Araceae).
  - Syngenesious – anthers are united as a tube; the filaments are free (Asteraceae).
  - Tetradynamous – having six stamens, four of which are longer than the others.
  - Translator – a structure uniting the pollinia in Asclepiadaceae and Orchidaceae.
  - Trinucleate – pollen containing three nuclei when shed.
  - Valvular – anthers opening through valves or small flaps; e.g. Berberis.
  - Versatile – anthers pivoting freely on the filament.
- Pollen –
- Stamen –
  - Anther – the distal end of the stamen where pollen is produced, normally composed of two parts called anther-sacs and pollen-sacs (thecae).
  - Filament – the stalk of a stamen.

===== Gynoecium =====
Style position

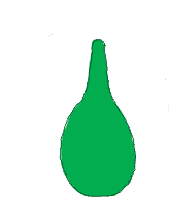
Terminal (apical)

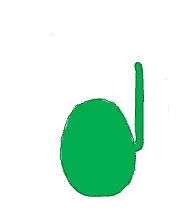
Lateral

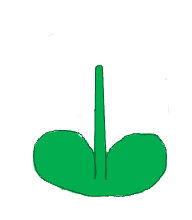
Gynobasic

- Gynoecium – the whorl of carpels; may comprise one (syncarpous), or more (apocarpous), pistils, each pistil consisting of an ovary, style, and stigma.
  - Apocarpus – the gynoecium consists of more than one pistil.
  - Cell –
  - Compound pistil –
  - Funicle – the stalk that connects the ovule to the placenta.
  - Funiculus –
  - Loculus – the cavities located within a carpel, ovary, or anther.
  - Locule –
  - multicarpellate –
  - Placenta –
  - Placentation –
    - Axile –
    - Basal –
    - Free-central –
    - Pariental –
  - Septum –
  - Simple pistil –
  - Syncarpous – the gynoecium consists of one pistil.
  - Unicarpellate –
- Stigma –
  - Sessile - absent style.
- Style – position is relative to the body of the ovary.
  - Terminal or apical – arising at the apex of the ovary (commonest).
  - Subapical – arising from the side of the ovary just below the apex.
  - Lateral – arising from the side of the ovary lower than subapical.
  - Gynobasic – arising from the base of the ovary.
- Ovary –
- Ovules –
- Pistil –

===== Other =====
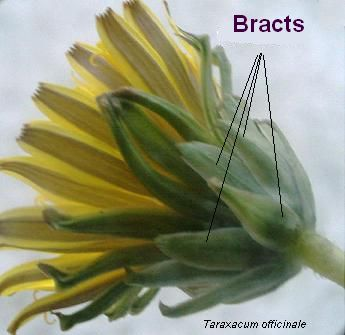
Bracts, Taraxacum officinale

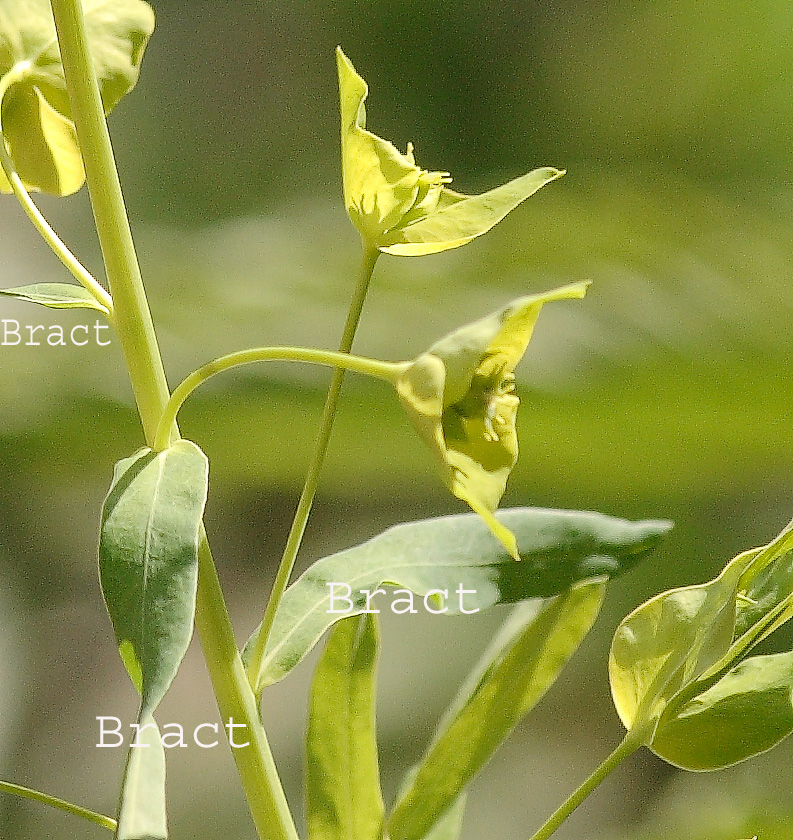
Bracts

- Acephalous – without a head, used to describe a flower style without a well-developed stigma.
- Bract – the leaf- or scale-like appendages that are located just below a flower, a flower stalk, or an inflorescence; they usually are reduced in size and sometimes showily or brightly colored.
- Calyx – the whorl of sepals at the base of a flower, the outer whorl of the perianth.
- Carpel – the ovule-producing reproductive organ of a flower, consisting of the stigma, style, and ovary.
- Claw – a noticeably narrowed or attenuated organ base, typically a petal; e.g. Viola.
- Connate – when the same parts of a flower are fused to each other, petals in a gamopetalous flower; e.g. Petunia.
- Corolla – the whorl of petals of a flower.
- Corona – an additional structure between the petals and the stamens.
- Disk – an enlargement or outgrowth from the receptacle of the flower, located at the center of the flowers of various plants. The term is also used for the central area of the head in composites where tubular flowers are attached.
- Epicalyx – a series of bracts below the calyx.
- Floral axis –
- Floral envelope – the perianth
- Flower –
- Fruit – a structure containing all the seeds produced by a single flower.
- Hypanthium –
- Nectar – a fluid produced by nectaries that is high in sugar content; used to attract pollinators.
- Nectary – a gland that secrets nectar, most often found in flowers, but also produced on other parts of plants.
- Nectar disk – when the floral disk contains nectar secreting glands; often modified as its main function in some flowers.
- Pedicel – the stem or stalk that holds a single flower in an inflorescence.
- Peduncle – the part of a stem that bears the entire inflorescence, normally having no leaves, or the leaves having been reduced to bracts. When the flower is solitary, it is the stem or stalk holding the flower.
  - Peduncular – referring to or having a peduncle.
  - Pedunculate – having a peduncle.
- Perianth –
  - Achlamydeous – without a perianth.
- Petal –
- Rachis –
- Receptacle – the end of the pedicel that joins to the flower were the different parts of the flower are joined; also called the torus. In Asteraceae, the top of the pedicel upon which the flowers are joined.
- Seed –
- Sepal –
  - Antipetalous – when the stamens number the same as, and are arranged opposite, the corolla segments; e.g. Primula.
  - Antisepalouse – when the stamens number the same as, and are arranged opposite, the calyx segments.
  - Connective – the part of the stamen joining the anther cells.
- Tepal –

==== Inflorescences ====
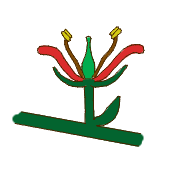
Pedicellate attachment

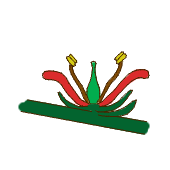
Sessile attachment

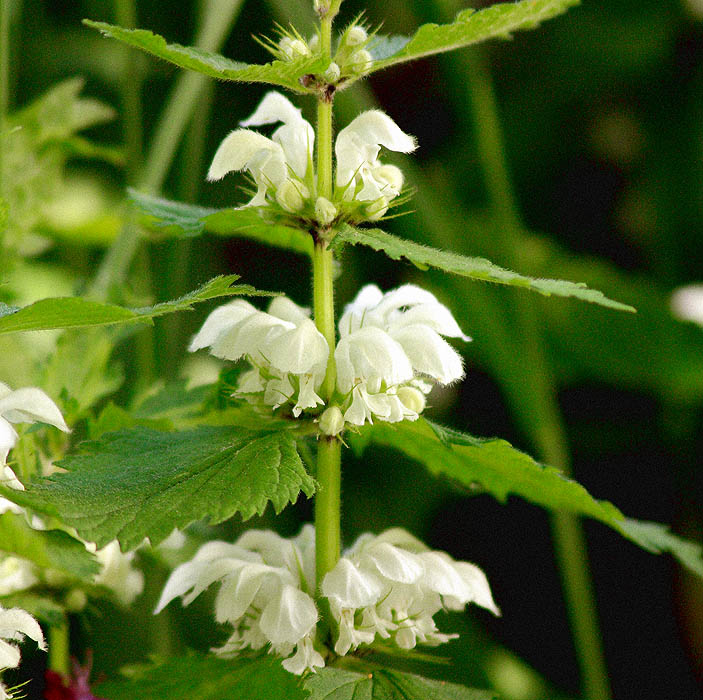
Verticillaster, Lamium album

- Capitulum – the flowers are arranged into a head composed of many separate unstalked flowers, the single flowers being packed close together and called florets, which is the typical arrangement in Asteraceae.
- Compound Umbel – an umbel where each stalk of the main umbel produces another smaller umbel of flowers.
- Corymb – a grouping of flowers where all the flowers are at the same level, the flower stalks of different lengths forming a flat-topped flower cluster.
- Cyme – is a cluster of flowers where the end of each growing point produces a flower. New growth comes from side shoots, and the oldest and first flowers to bloom are at the top.
- Single – one flower per stem, or flowers greatly spread apart so as to appear to not arise from the same branch.
- Spike – flowers arising from the main stem are without individual flower stalks. The flowers attach directly to the stem.
- Solitary – same as single, with one flower per stem.
- Raceme – a flower spike with flowers that have stalks of equal length. The stem tip continues to grow and produces more flowers, with the bottom flowers opening first and blooming progressing up the stem.
- Panicle – a raceme with branches, each branch having a smaller raceme of flowers. The terminal bud of each branch continues to grow, producing more side shoots and flowers.
- Pedicel – stem holding a one flower in an inflorescence.
- Peduncle – stem holding an inflorescence, or a single flower.
- Umbel – where the flower head has all flower stalks rising from the same point and of equal length, the flower head seeming hemispherical like an open umbrella.
- Verticillaster – a whorled collection of flowers around a stem, the flowers produced in rings at intervals up the stem. As the stem tip continues to grow, more whorls of flowers are produced. Typical in Lamiaceae.
- Verticil – flowers arranged in whorls at the nodes.

==== Insertion of floral parts ====
- Epigynous – flowers are present above the ovary.
- Half-inferior –
- Hypogynous – flowers are present below the ovary
- Inferior –
- Insertion –
  - Stamens –
  - Ovary –
- Perigynous –
- Superior –

=== Specialized terms ===
- Wing – a lateral petal of the flowers of species in Fabaceae and Polygalaceae.
- Valvate – meeting along the margins but not overlapping.

==== Union of flower parts ====
- Adelphous – androecium with the stamen filaments partly or completely fused together.

==== Flower sexuality and presence of floral parts ====
- Achlamydeous – a flower without a perianth.
- Apetalous – a flower without petals.
- Accrescent – said of the calyx when it is persistent and enlarges as the fruit grows and ripens; sometimes applied to other structures.
- Androgynous – used for the inflorescence of Carex when a spike has both staminate and pistillate flowers; the pistillate flowers are normally at the base of the spike.
- Bisexual –
- Complete – of a flower, having all the possible parts represented: sepals, petals, stamens, and pistils.
- Gynodioecy – describes a plant species or population that has some plants that are female and some plants that are hermaphrodites.
- Homogamous – when the flower's anthers and stigma are ripe at the same time.
- Imperfect – of a flower or inflorescence, being unisexual and having organs of only a single sex.
- Naked – uncovered, stripped of leaves, or lacking other covering such as sepals or petals.
- Perfect – possessing both stamens and ovary (male and female parts).

==== Flower symmetry ====
- Actinomorphic – having a radial symmetry, as in regular flowers.
  - Actinomorphy – when the flower parts are arranged with radial symmetry.
- Radial – symmetric when bisected through any angle (circular)
- Unisexual –
- Zygomorphic – one axis of symmetry running down the middle of the flower so the right and left halves reflect each other.
  - Zygomorphy – the type of symmetry that most irregular flowers have, where the upper half of the flower is unlike the lower half, but the left and right halves tend to be mirror images of each other.

=== Pollination and fertilization ===
- Allogamy – cross pollination, when one plant pollinates another plant
- Anemophilous – wind-pollinated.
- Autogamy – self-pollination, when the flowers of the same plant pollinate each other, including a flower pollinating itself.
- Cantharophilous – beetle-pollinated.
- Chiropterophilous – bat-pollinated.
- Cleistogamous – self-pollination of a flower that does not open.
- Dichogamy – flowers that cannot pollinate themselves because pollen is produced at a time when the stigmas are not receptive to pollen.
- Entomophilous – insect-pollinated.
- Hydrophilous – water-pollinated; pollen is moved in water from one flower to the next.
- Malacophilous – pollinated by snails and slugs.
- Ornithophilous – pollinated by birds.
- Pollination – the movement of pollen from the anther to the stigma.
- Protandrous – when pollen is produced and shed before the carpels are mature.
- Progynous – when the carpels mature before the stamens produce pollen.

==== Embryo development ====
- Antipodal cell –
- Chalazal –
- Coleoptile – protective sheath on SAM.
- Coleorhiza – protecting layer of a seed.
- Cotyledon – "Seed leaves"; first leaves sprouted in a dicot, where there are two cotyledons in a seedling.
- Diploid
- Double fertilization –
- Embryo –
- Embryo sac –
- Endosperm –
- Filiform apparatus –
- Germination –
- Plumule – the part of an embryo that give rise to the shoot system of a plant.
- Polar nuclei –
- Radicle – initial root-determined cells (Root apical meristem).
- Scutellum –
- Synergid –
- Tegmen –
- Testa – the seed coat; develops from the integuments after fertilization.
  - Sarcotesta – a fleshy seed coat.
  - Sclerotesta – a hard seed coat.
- Triploid –
- Xenia – the effect of pollen on seeds and fruit.
- Zygote –

=== Fruits and seeds ===
Fruits are the mature ovary of seed-bearing plants, and they include the contents of the ovary, which can be floral parts like the receptacle, involucre, calyx, and others that are fused to it. Fruits are often used to identify plant taxa, help to place the species in the correct family, or differentiate different groups within the same family.

==== Terms for fruits ====
- Accessory structures – parts of fruits that do not form from the ovary.
- Beak – normally the slender elongated end of a fruit, typically a persistent style-base.
- Bur
- Circumscissile – a type of fruit that dehisces, where the top of the fruit falls away like a lid or covering.
- Dehiscent – a fruit that opens and releases its contents, normally in a regular and distinctive fashion.
- Endocarp – includes the wall of the seed chamber, the inner part of the pericarp.
  - Pyrena – the hardened endocarp of a drupe.
- Exocarp – the pericarp's outer part.
- Fleshy – soft and juicy.
- Indehiscent – fruits that do not have specialized structures for opening and releasing the seeds; they remain closed after the seeds ripen and are opened by animals, weathering, fire, or other external means.
- Mesocarp – the middle layer of the pericarp.
- Pericarp – the body of the fruit from its outside surface to the chamber where the seeds are, including the outside skin of the fruit and the inside lining of the seed chamber.
- Suture – the seam along which the fruit opens; normally in most fruits it is where the carpel or carpels are fused together.
- Valve – one of the segments of the capsule.

==== Fruit types ====
Scheme of a drupe

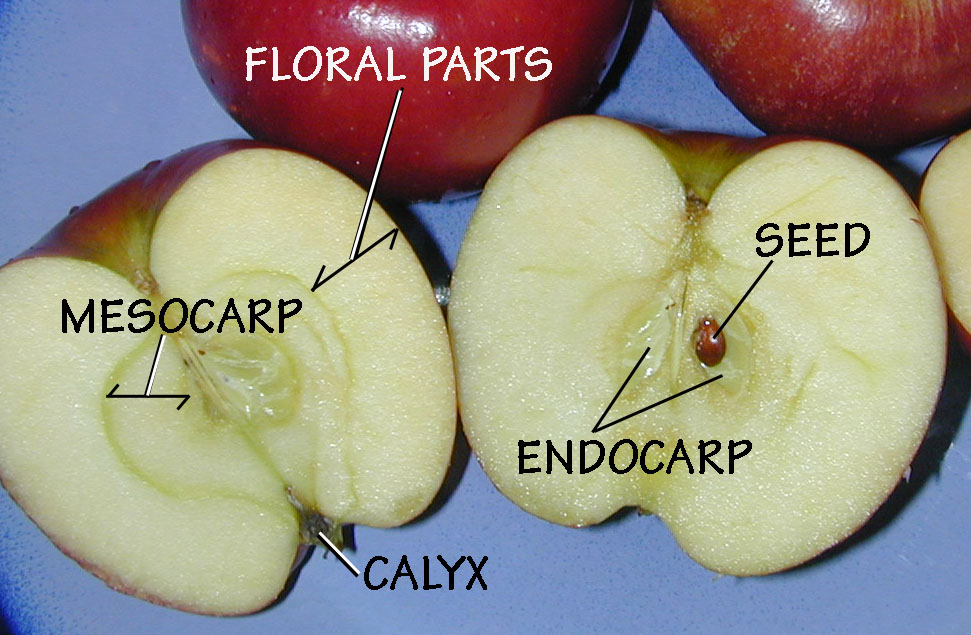
Scheme of a pome

Fruits are divided into different types, depending on how they form, where or how they open, and what parts they are composed of.

- Achaenocarp – see achene.
- Achene – dry indehiscent fruit that have one seed and are formed from a single carpel; the seed is distinct from the fruit wall.
- Caryopsis – the pericarp and seed are fused together, the fruit of many grasses.
- Drupe – outer fleshy part that surrounds a shell with a seed inside.
- Nut – a fruit formed from a pistil with multiple carpels and having a woody covering; e.g. hickory, pecan, and oak.
- Nutlet – a small nut.
- Pod (seedpod) – a dry dehiscent fruit containing many seeds. Examples include follicles, dehiscent capsules, and many but not all legumes.
- Pome – accessory fruit from one or more carpels; specific to the apple and some related genera in the family Rosaceae.
- Samara – winged achene, e.g. maples.
- Utricle – a small inflated fruit with one seed that has thin walls. Fruits are usually one-seeded, as are some species of amaranth.

=== Seedless reproduction ===
==== Pteridophytes ====
- Acrostichoid sorus – having sori covering the entire underside; e.g. Acrostichum.
- Annulus – outer part of the sporangium
- Elater –
- Indusium –
- Marginal –
- Peltate –
- Reniform –
- Sporophyll –
- Sorus / Sori – a group or cluster of sporangia borne abaxially on a fern frond.
- Strobilus –
- Submarginal –

==== Bryophytes ====
===== Gametangium =====
- Acrandrous – used for moss species that have antheridia at the top of the stem.
- Acrocarpous – in mosses, bearing the sporophyte at the axis of the main shoot.
- Acrogynous – in liverworts, the female sex organs terminate the main shoot.
- Anacrogynous – in liverworts, female sex organs are produced by a lateral cell, and thus the growth of the main shoot is indeterminate.
- Androcyte –
- Androecium – collective term for all the male parts of an organism.
- Androgynous – monoicous, and producing both types of sex organs together.
- Antheridiophore – a specialised branch that bears the antheridia in the Marchantiales.
- Antherozoid –
- Archegoniophore – a specialised branch that bears the archaegonia in the Marchantiales.
- Autoicous – produces male and female sex organs on the same plant but on separate inflorescences.
- Bract – leaf is present below the flower.
- Cladautoicous – male and female inflorescences are on separate branches of the same plant.
- Dioicous – having two forms of gametophyte, one form bearing antheridia and one form bearing archegonia.
- Gonioautoicous – male is bud-like in the axil of a female branch.
- Incubous – describing the arrangement of leaves of a liverwort; contrast with succubous.
- Inflorescence – cluster of flower
- Involucre – a tube of thallus tissue that protects the archegonia.
- Monoicous – having a single form of gametophyte bearing both antheridia and archegonia, either together or on separate branches.
- Paraphyses – sterile hairs surrounding the archegonia and antheridia.
- Perianth – a protective tube that surrounds the archegonia, characterising the Jungermannialean liverworts.
- Perichaetium – the cluster of leaves with the enclosed female sex organs.
- Perigonium – the cluster of leaves with the enclosed male sex organs.
- Pseudautoicous – dwarf male plants growing on living leaves of female plants.
- Pseudomonoicous –
- Pseudoperianth – an involucre that resembles a perianth, but is made of thallus tissue, and usually forms after the sporophyte develops.
- Rhizautoicous – male inflorescence attached to the female stem by rhizoids.
- Succubous – describing the arrangement of leaves of a liverwort; contrast with incubous.
- Synoicous – male and female sex organs are on the same gametophyte, but are not clustered.

===== Sporangium =====
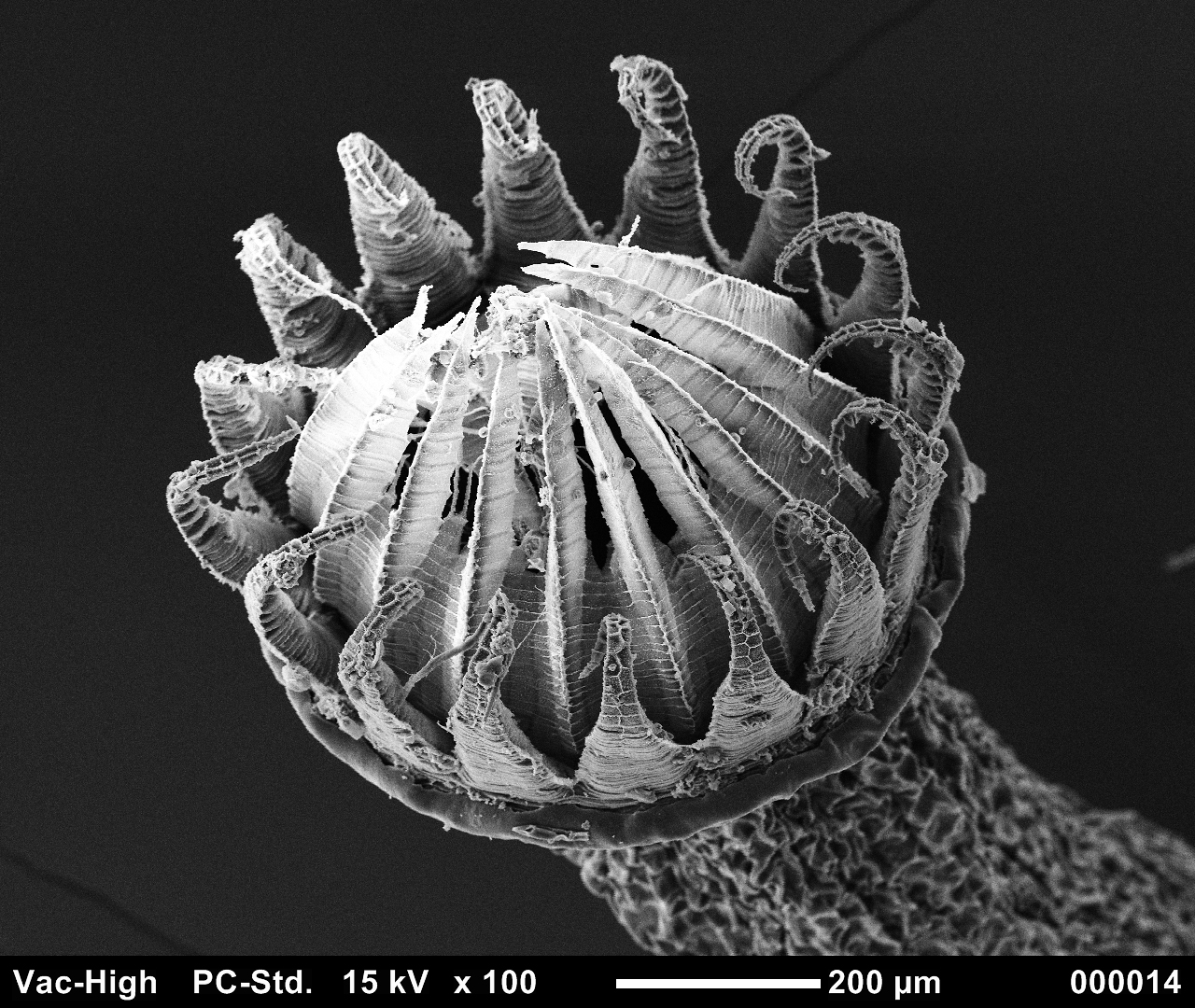
Mouth of a sporophyte, showing the teeth of the peristome. (It is diplolepidous, with a closed endostome and opened exostome)

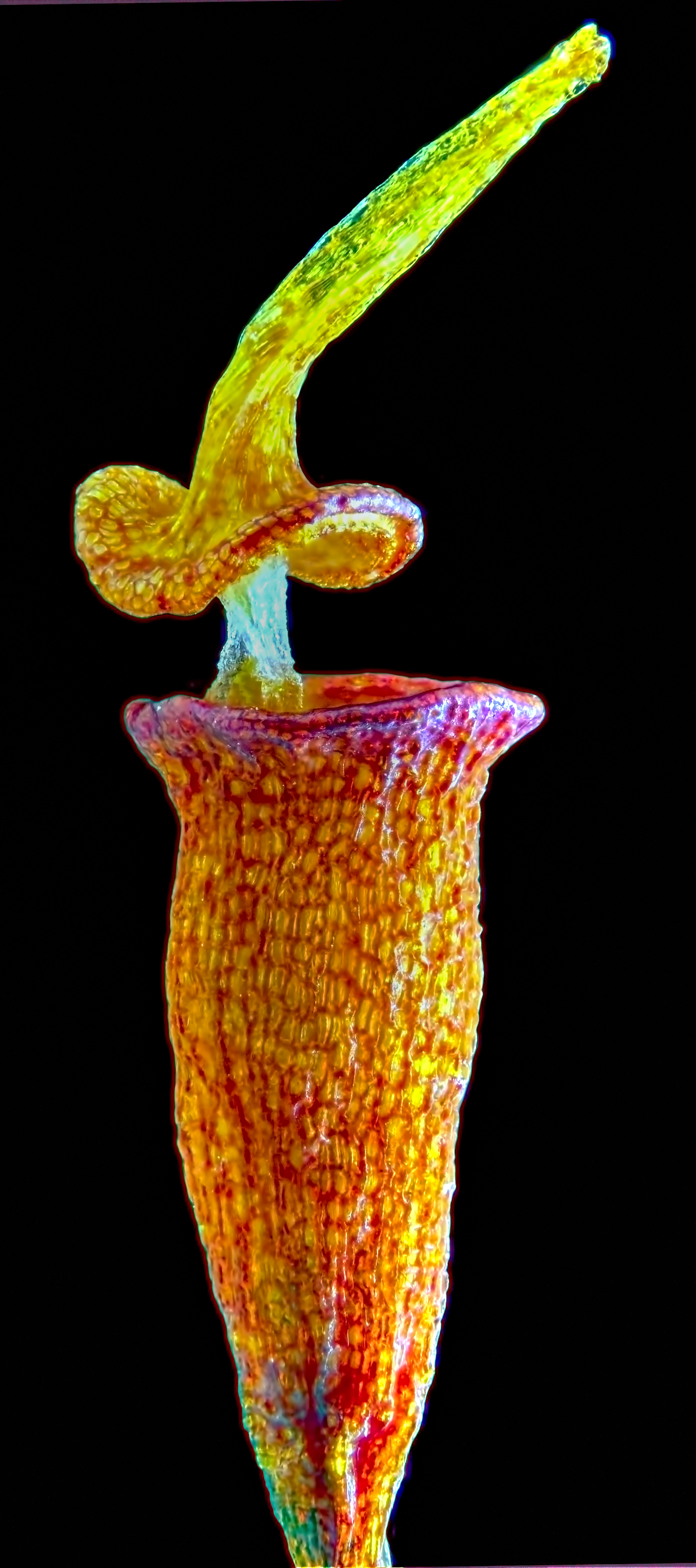
Dehisced capsule of a sporophyte, with the operculum remaining attached via the columella

- Amphithecium – the external cell layers of the developing sporangium of a bryophyte. (Note: this term is also used in the mycology of lichens.)
- Anisosporous – anisospore production is a rare condition in dioecious bryophytes; meiosis produces two small spores that develop into male gametophytes and two larger spores that develop into female gametophytes; contrast Isosporous.
- Annulus – in mosses, cells with thick walls along the rim of the sporangium and where the peristome teeth are attached.
- Apophysis – a swelling, typically referring to the base of the sporangium.
- Archesporium – cells of the sporangium from which spores develop.
- Arthrodontous – a form of peristome teeth which are unequally thickened, tapering to a point.
- Articulate – generally, meaning jointed.
- Astomous – having a capsule which bursts irregularly, lacking a stoma.
- Calyptra – an enlarged archegonial venter that protects the capsule containing the embryonic sporophyte.
- Capsule – generally synonymous with the sporangium, it specifically refers to the structure which contains the spores. Sometimes referred to as an "urn"
- Cleistocarpous – having a capsule which lacks an operculum, often closed.
- Columella – an axis of sterile tissue which passes through the center of the spore-case of mosses.
- Dehisce – meaning to split along a natural line, refers to the split in the capsule where the operculum detaches.
- Diplolepidous – a type of peristome found in Bryidae, in which there are two rings of teeth - the inner endostome and outer exostome.
- Divisural line –
- Elater – structures derived from the sporangium of liverworts that aid in spore dispersal
- Endostome – The inner ring of peristome teeth in diplolepidous peristomes.
- Endothecium – the internal cell layers of the developing sporangium of a bryophyte.
- Epiphragm – a circular membrane connected to the tips of peristome teeth in some types of sporangia, partially closing the capsule opening
- Exostome – the outer ring of peristome teeth in diplolepidous peristomes.
- Exothecium – the outermost layer of the amphithecium, the epidermis of the capsule wall.
- Foot – the basal connection between the sporophyte and gametophyte.
- Gymnostomous – lacking a peristome.
- Haplolepidous – having a peristome with one row of arthrodontous teeth.
- Hypophysis – a swelling, typically referring to the base of the sporangium.
- Immersed – meaning submerged or below the surface.
- Indehiscent – remaining closed at maturity; spores are dispersed as the capsule bursts, rather than through the stoma
- Inoperculate – lacking an operculum.
- Isosporous – unlike anisosporous species, whether monoecious or dioecious, all spores are the same size.
- Mother cells - cells which produce spores.
- Nematodontous – a form of peristome teeth which are equally thickened.
- Nurse cells – Sterile mother cells which nourish developing spores.
- Operculate – referring to the operculum.
- Operculum – the "lid" of the sporangia. At maturity, it falls off and the stoma and peristome are revealed, allowing for spore dispersal
- Peristome – the tooth-like structure surrounding the stoma, the opening into the capsule
- Pseudoelater – structures derived from the sporangium of hornworts that aid in spore dispersal.
- Seta – the area of the sporophyte between the capsule and foot (base).
- Stegocarpous – referring to a capsule with a differentiated and dehiscent operculum.
- Stoma – the "mouth" of the sporangia, from which spores are dispersed when the sporangia is mature.
- Tapetum – tissue which nourishes spores.
- Trabecula – a length of sterile tissue which divides the capsule.
- Urn - synonymous with the "capsule."
- Valve – each half of a sporangium which is divided.

== See also ==
- Glossary of botanical terms
- Glossary of leaf shapes

== Bibliography ==
=== General ===
- Wickens, G.E. (2001). Economic Botany: Principles And Practices. Dordrecht: Kluwer. ISBN 978-1-4020-2228-9.

=== Systematics ===
- Radford, A. E; Dickinson, W. C.; Massey, J. R.; Bell, C. R. (1974). Vascular Plant Systematics. New York: Harper & Row. ISBN 978-0-06-045309-1.
- Jones, Samuel B. (1986). Plant Systematics. McGraw-Hill. ISBN 978-0-07-032796-2.
- Simpson, Michael G. (2011). Plant Systematics. Academic Press. ISBN 978-0-08-051404-8.
  - Glossary p. 547
- Singh, Gurcharan (2004). Plant Systematics: An Integrated Approach (3 ed.). Science Publishers. ISBN 978-1-57808-351-0.
- Judd, Walter S.; Campbell, Christopher S.; Kellogg, Elizabeth A.; Stevens, Peter F.; Donoghue, Michael J. (2007). Plant systematics: a phylogenetic approach. (1st ed. 1999, 2nd 2002) (3 ed.). Sinauer Associates. ISBN 978-0-87893-407-2.

=== Anatomy and morphology ===
- Bell, A. D. (1991). Plant Form, an Illustrated Guide to Flowering Plant Morphology. Oxford: Oxford University Press. ISBN 978-0-19-854279-7.
- Weberling, Focko (1992). Morphology of Flowers and Inflorescences (trans. Richard J. Pankhurst). CUP Archive. ISBN 978-0-521-43832-2.
- Rudall, Paula J. (2007). Anatomy of flowering plants : an introduction to structure and development (3 ed.). Cambridge: Cambridge Univ. Press. ISBN 978-0-521-69245-8.
  - also available here
- Dickinson, Tim (1999). "Comparative morphology: heterotopy and "cruddophytes"". Dickinson Lab, Botany Department, University of Toronto. Archived from the original on 26 September 2015.
- González, A.M.; Arbo, M.M. (2016). "Botánica Morfológica: Morfología de Plantas Vasculares" (in Spanish). Corrientes, Argentina: Facultad de Ciencias Agrarias, Universidad Nacional del Nordeste.
- "Fruit Anatomy". Department of Plant Sciences, College of Agricultural & Environmental Sciences, UC Davis. 2016.

=== Glossaries ===
- Chiang, Fernando; Mario Sousa, S; Mario Sousa, P. "Glosario Inglés-Español, Español-Inglés para Flora Mesoamericana". Missouri Botanical Gardens.
- "Fire Effects Information System Glossary". Fire Effects Information System (FEIS). USDA Forest Service. 2015.
- Slee, AV; Brooker, MIH; Duffy, SM; West, JG (2006). "Glossary". Euclid: Eucalypts of Australia. Victoria, Australia: CSIRO. Archived from the original on 14 March 2011.
- Hickey, Michael; King, Clive (2000). The Cambridge Illustrated Glossary of Botanical Terms. Cambridge University Press. ISBN 978-0-521-79401-5.

=== Dictionaries ===
- Font Quer, P. (1953). Diccionario de Botánica, Ed. Labor, Barcelona, .
- Hart, G.T. (2011). Plants in literature and life : a wide-ranging dictionary of botanical terms. Victoria, BC: Friesen Press. ISBN 978-1-77067-441-7. Archived from the original on 18 January 2015.
- Usher, George (1996). The Wordsworth Dictionary of Botany. Ware, Hertfordshire: Wordsworth Reference. ISBN 978-1-85326-374-3.
