= Succubous =

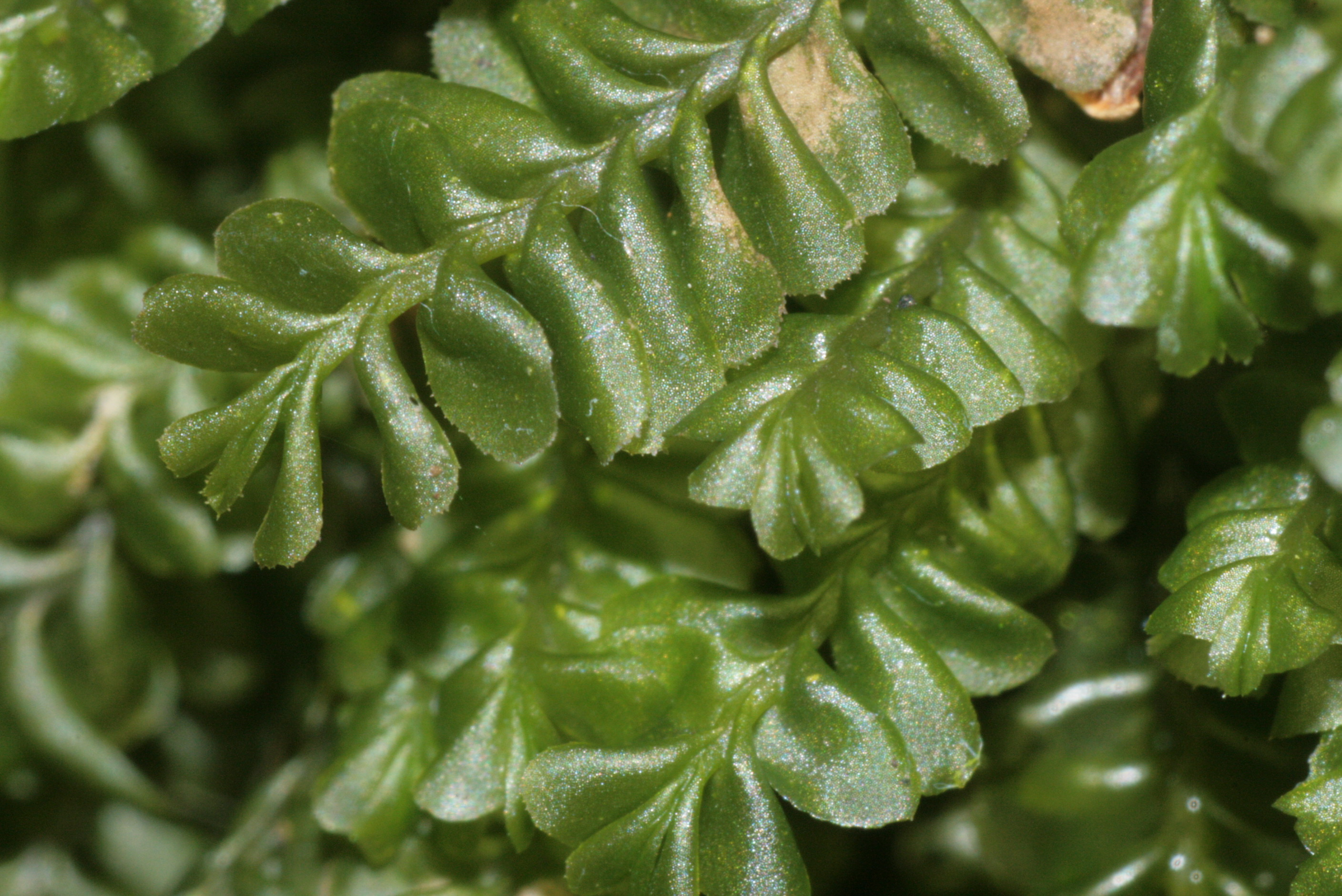
Shoots of Plagiochila porelloides – the lower part of each leaf covers part of the leaf below it, making it succubous

Succubous is a manner in which the leaves of a liverwort overlap. If one were to look down from above (dorsal side) on a plant where the leaf attachment is succubous, the upper edge of each leaf would be covered by the next leaf along the stem. The lower edge of each leaf is visible from above, but the edge of the leaf closer to the tip of the stem is obscured by a neighboring leaf. The opposite of succubous is incubous.
