= Incubous =

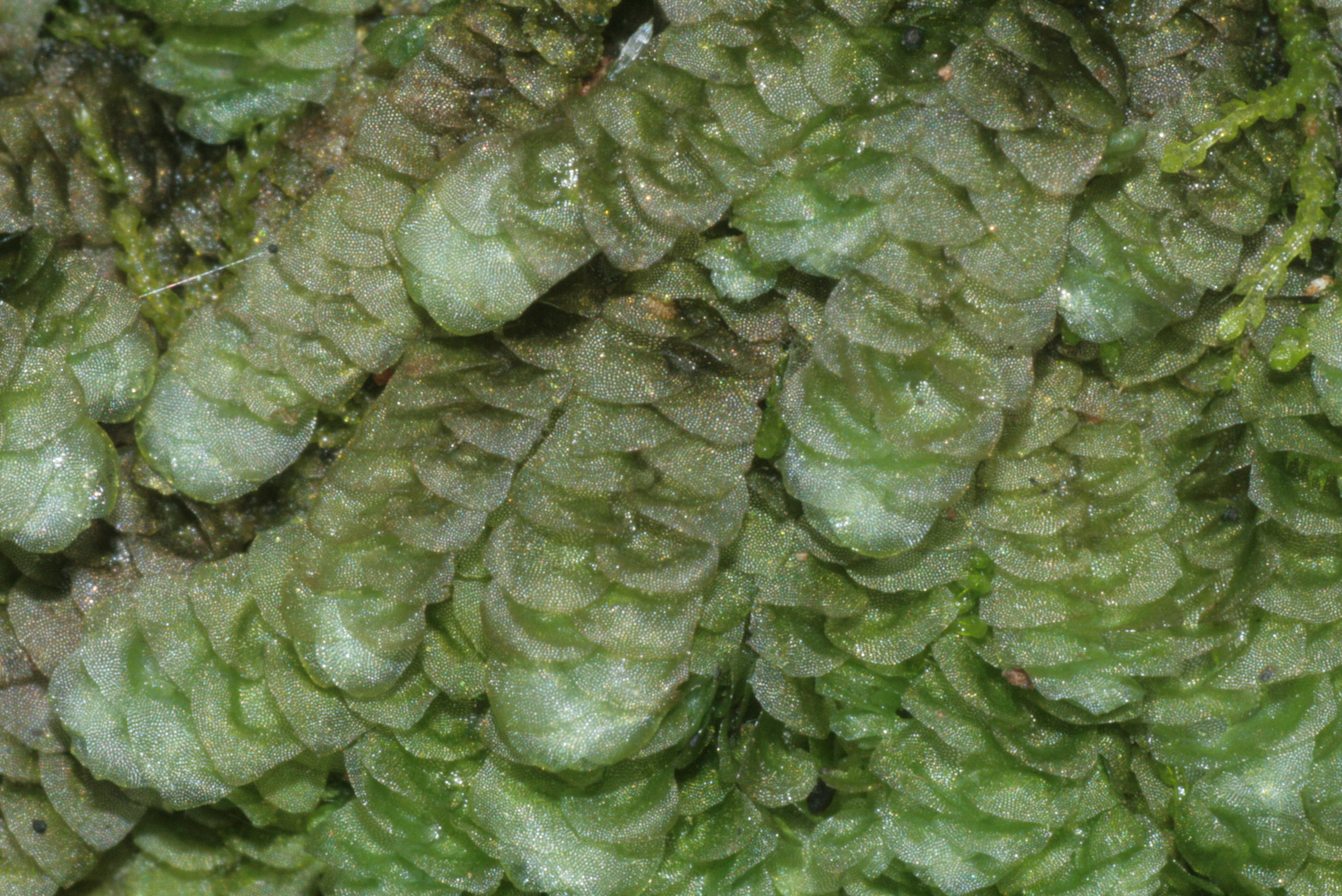
The leaves of Calypogeia are incubous.

The term incubous describes the way in which the leaves of a liverwort are attached to the stem. If one were to look down from above (dorsal side) on a plant where the leaf attachment is incubous, the upper edge of each leaf would overlap the next higher leaf along the stem. Because of this, the upper edge of each leaf is visible from above, but the lower edge of each leaf is obscured by its neighboring leaf. The opposite of incubous is succubous.
