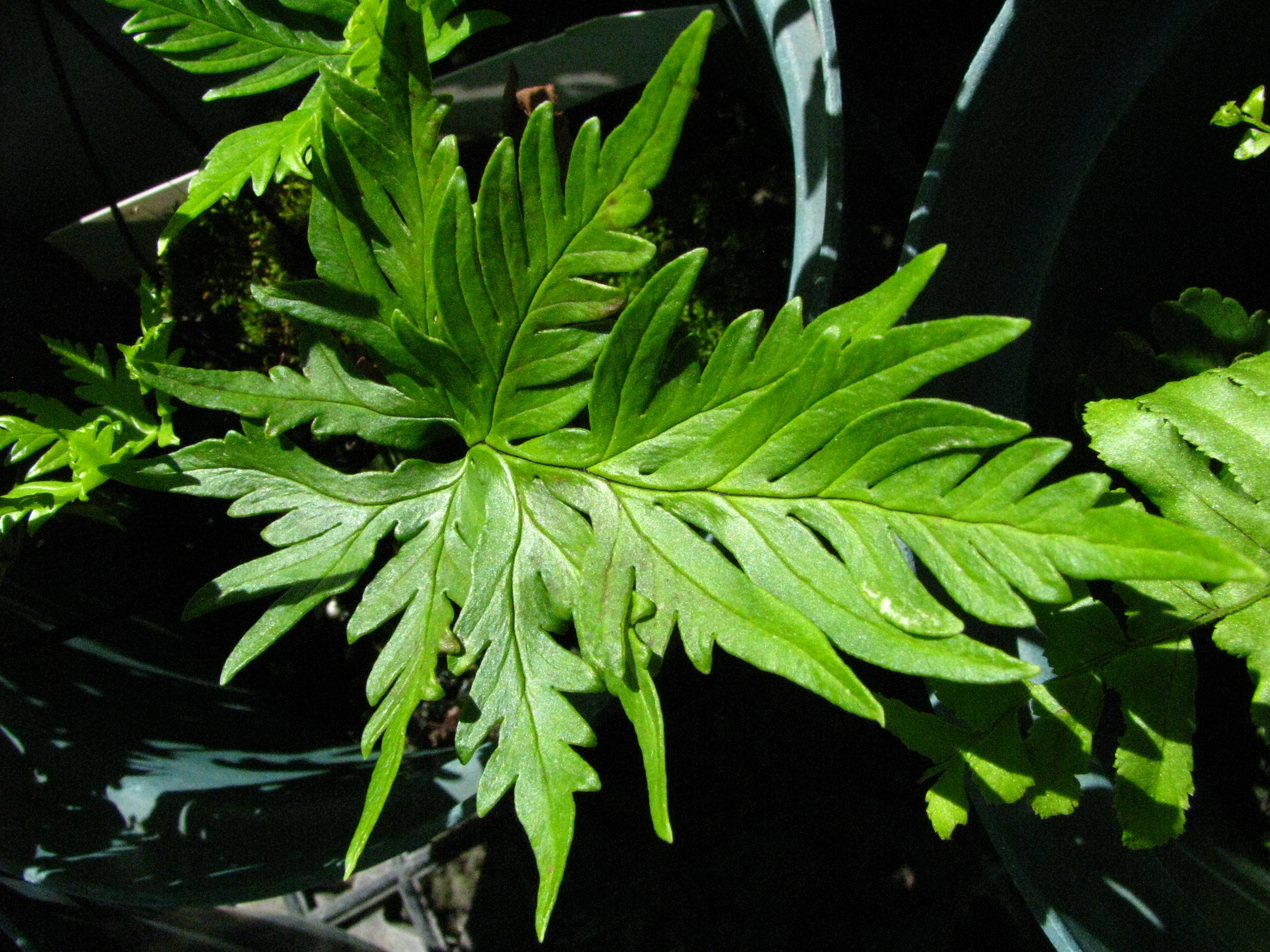

Conservation status
- Critically Imperiled (NatureServe)

Scientific classification
- Kingdom: Plantae
- Clade: Tracheophytes
- Division: Polypodiophyta
- Class: Polypodiopsida
- Order: Polypodiales
- Family: Pteridaceae
- Genus: Doryopteris
- Species: D. angelica

Binomial name
- Doryopteris angelica K.Wood & W.H.Wagner

= Doryopteris angelica =

Species of fern

Doryopteris angelica is a rare fern species, known by the common name Kauai digit fern. It is endemic to Hawaii where only small populations are known.

The ferns grow on slopes in Hawaiian tropical rainforests habitat, and have been found only on the island of Kauaʻi. It was federally listed as an endangered species in 2010.

== Taxonomy ==
Doryopteris angelica is closely related to Doryopteris decora, and was first described as a separate species in 1999. It is now placed in the Cheilanthoideae subfamily of the Pteridaceae.
