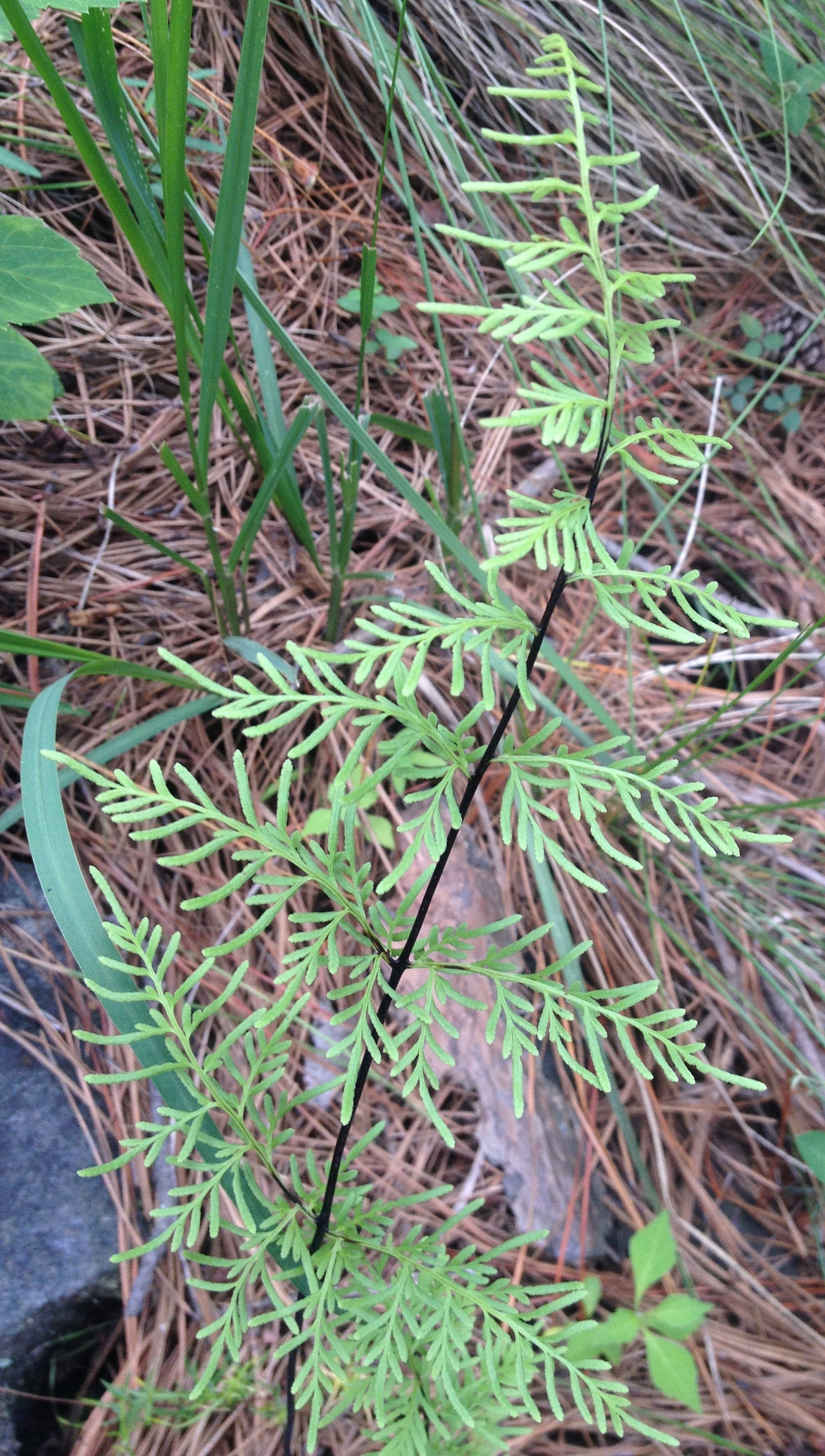
- Mildella fallax

Scientific classification
- Kingdom: Plantae
- Clade: Tracheophytes
- Division: Polypodiophyta
- Class: Polypodiopsida
- Order: Polypodiales
- Family: Pteridaceae
- Subfamily: Cheilanthoideae
- Genus: Mildella; Trevis.

Species
- See text.

= Mildella =

Genus of ferns

Mildella is a genus of ferns in the subfamily Cheilanthoideae of the family Pteridaceae. Species are native to Mexico, Central America and the Caribbean.

== Species ==
The Pteridophyte Phylogeny Group classification of 2016 (PPG I) placed seven species in the genus, although recognizing that the genus was then not monophyletic, since the New and Old World species belonged in different clades. As of December 2019, the Checklist of Ferns and Lycophytes of the World placed only two New World species in the genus:

- Mildella fallax (M.Martens & Galeotti) G.L.Nesom
- Mildella intramarginalis (Kaulf. ex Link) Trevis.

The Checklist of Ferns and Lycophytes of the World placed former Mildella species in the genus Oeosporangium:

- Mildella henryi (Christ) C.C.Hall & Lellinger = Oeosporangium nitidulum
- Mildella mairei (Brause) C.C.Hall & Lellinger = Oeosporangium mairei
- Mildella nitidula (Wall. ex Hook.) C.C. Hall & Lellinger = Oeosporangium nitidulum
- Mildella paupercula (Christ) C.C.Hall & Lellinger = Oeosporangium pauperculum
- Mildella smithii (C.Chr.) C.C.Hall & Lellinger = Oeosporangium smithii
- Mildella straminea (Ching) C.C.Hall & Lellinger = Oeosporangium stramineum
