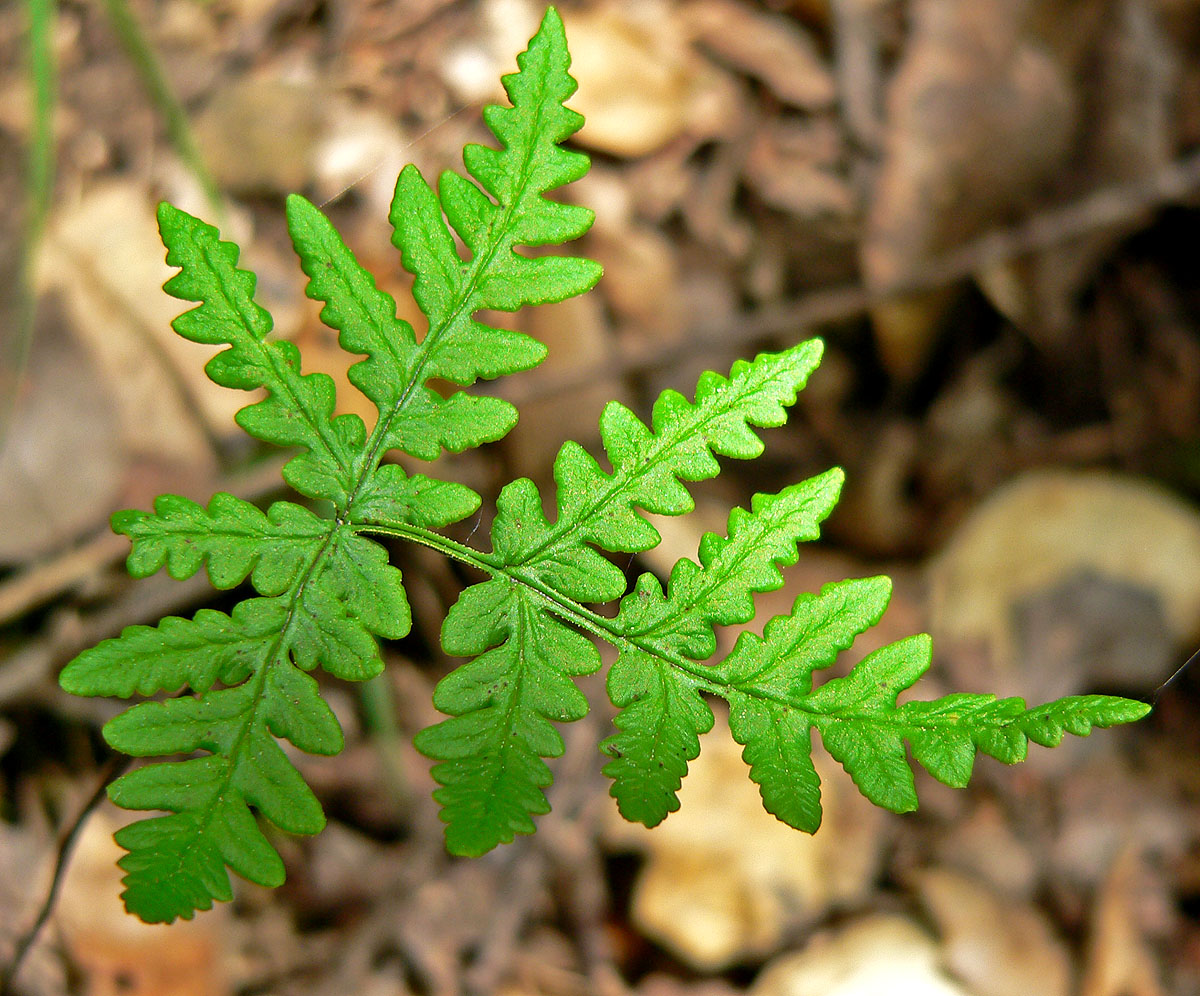

Scientific classification
- Kingdom: Plantae
- Clade: Tracheophytes
- Division: Polypodiophyta
- Class: Polypodiopsida
- Order: Polypodiales
- Family: Pteridaceae
- Subfamily: Cheilanthoideae
- Genus: Pentagramma
- Species: P. triangularis

Binomial name
- Pentagramma triangularis (Kaulf.) Yatsk., Windham & E. Wollenw.

Synonyms
- Ceropteris triangularis (Kaulf.) Underw.; Gymnogramma triangularis Kaulf.; Gymnopteris triangularis Underw.; Hemionitis triangularis (Kaulf.) Christenh.; Neurogramma triangularis Diels; Pityrogramma triangularis Maxon

= Pentagramma triangularis =

Species of fern

Pentagramma triangularis, commonly known as the gold fern or the goldback fern, is a species of fern in the family Pteridaceae, native to Western North America, with highest abundance in the state of California. Its common name "goldback" refers to the light yellow color of the fern's protective coating which inhibits moisture loss. The gold texture appears as a dry powder that is excreted on the underside of the fern. The Latin genus name Pentagramma derives from "five lines" or "stripes" while the specific epithet triangularis derives from "three sided", describing the shape of the fern's broad triangular fronds.

== Description ==
Like all ferns, P. triangularis does not produce flowers nor seeds, only spores. It has long smooth petioles (frond stems) that are anywhere from black to brown in color, and its fronds are bright to dark green on top with dark spore sacs (sporangia) on the leaf bottom surrounded by a lighter yellow excreted powdery substance.

P. triangularis can grow to a height of 6 to 12 inches. In common with other Pentagramma species, the basal pinna has a characteristic asymmetry, with the basal secondary pinna on one side much (2 to 6-fold) longer than on the other. In response to dry conditions, the leaves curl up with the lower (spore) side outward, presumably to conserve water.

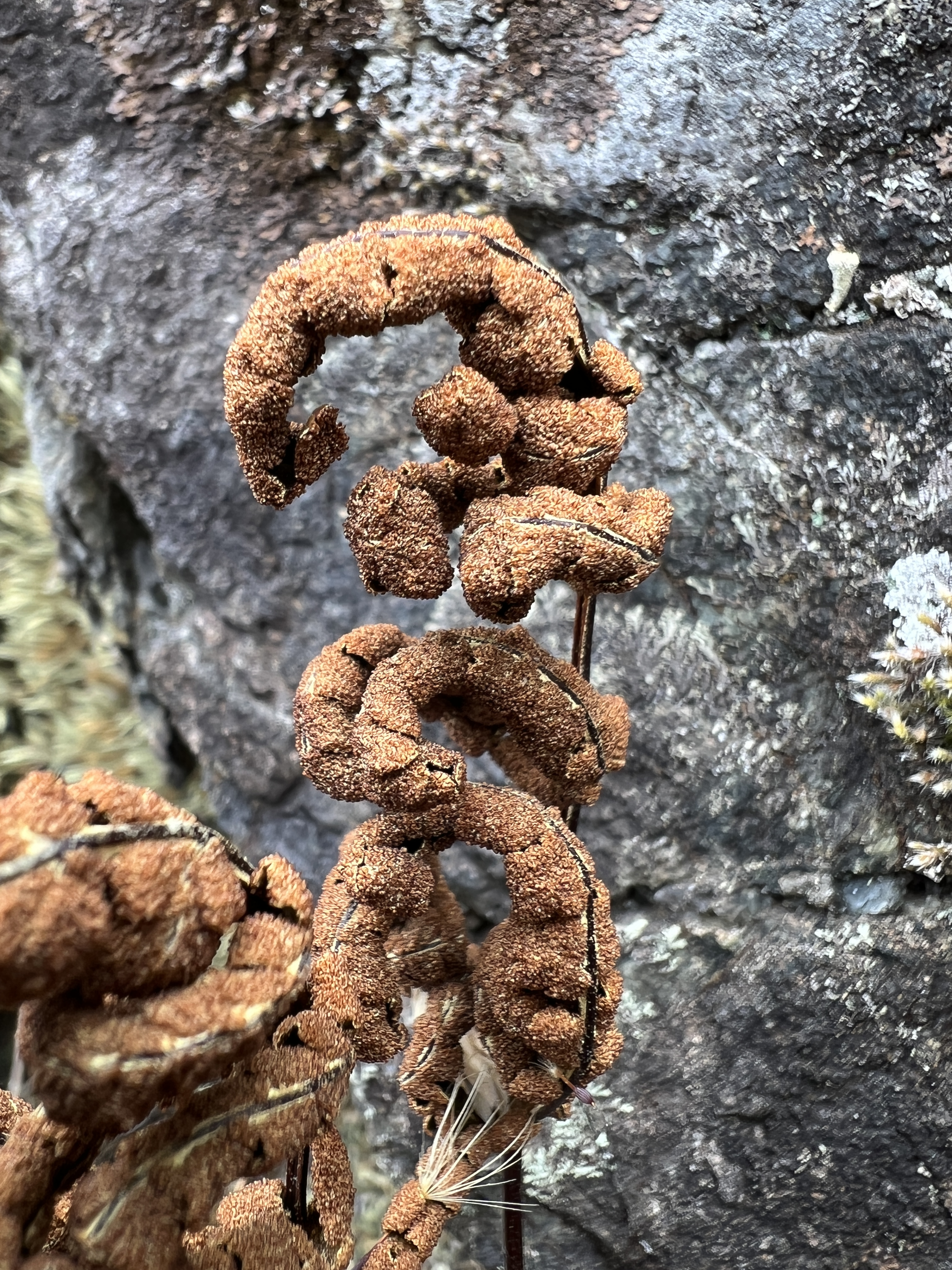
Pentagramma triangularis leaf curled up in response to dry period

== Subspecies ==
- P. triangularis subsp. semipallida (J. Howell) G. Yatsk. et al. – pale gold back fern
- P. triangularis subsp. triangularis

Some taxa formerly considered subspecies of P. triangularis have been raised to species rank in Pentagramma.

- Pentagramma maxonii, previously P. triangularis subsp. maxonii
- Pentagramma viscosa, previously P. triangularis subsp. viscosa

== Distribution ==
The distribution of P. triangularis includes much of the west coast of North America and extends from Vancouver Island, British Columbia, to Baja California, Mexico, east to Arizona, and in the Blue Mountains of south eastern Washington. This species is also found on the Pacific island of Guadalupe off the Baja California shore, and plants there may represent an undescribed taxon.

== Habitat ==
In California P. triangularis prefers shaded areas and is commonly found in rocky crevices and on north-facing slopes, in mixed evergreen and oak forests, and occasionally on dry brushy slopes. In more northerly locations, such as British Columbia and Washington State west of the Cascade Range, it may be found in part shade or full sun mostly on rocky outcrops. It is found at elevations between sea level and 8,500 ft (2591 m).

== Uses ==
The fronds are eaten by species such as the Dusky-footed woodrat.

The Indigenous tribes of California would use the goldback fern as an analgesic treatment. The Karuk tribe would use the fern to treat pain related to childbirth, and the Miwok tribe would use the fern as a treatment for toothaches. Additionally, Yurok tribe children would use the fern to create body art with the golden powder.
