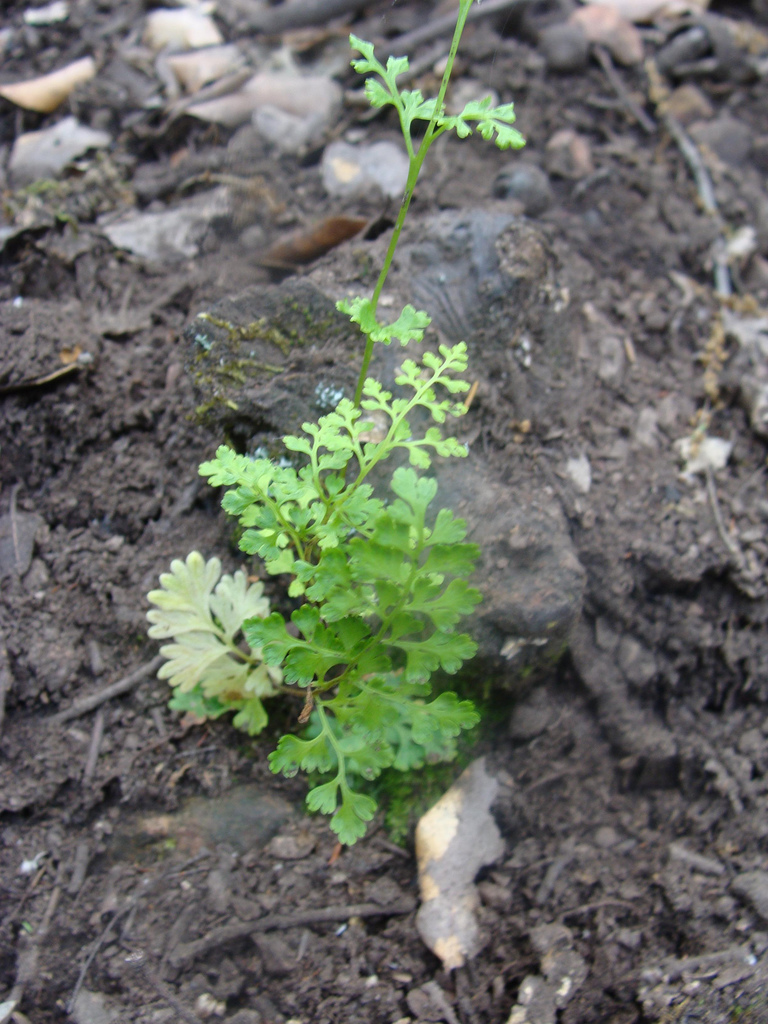

Scientific classification
- Kingdom: Plantae
- Clade: Tracheophytes
- Division: Polypodiophyta
- Class: Polypodiopsida
- Order: Polypodiales
- Family: Pteridaceae
- Genus: Anogramma
- Species: A. leptophylla

Binomial name
- Anogramma leptophylla (L.) Link

Synonyms
- Anogramma caespitosa

= Anogramma leptophylla =

Species of plant

Anogramma leptophylla, sometimes called Jersey fern, is a species of fern in the family Pteridaceae. It is found worldwide in temperate and subtropical regions. A rarity in the Pteridophyta, it is a fern whose sporophyte tends to have an annual life cycle. The gametophytes of this species have the ability to become dormant and wait as much as two and a half years until conditions are appropriate for the sporophyte stage of the life-cycle.

== Description ==
Anogramma leptophylla is a small annual fern, seldom exceeding 3 in (8 cm) in height. It has delicate, two-pinnate fronds, only the inner ones being fertile and bearing linear spore cases on the undersides of the nearly circular leaflets, occupying most of their surface area. The leaf margins are not curled.

== Distribution and habitat ==
Anogramma leptophylla has an oceanic temperate distribution. It is found around the Mediterranean; in Africa; southern and eastern Asia; Oceania; and in Mexico and Central and South America. The only place in the British Isles in which it occurs is the island of Jersey in the Channel Islands. It grows on walls and banks, especially when there is underlying granite rock. It prefers to grow on bare soil in moist but well-drained locations as it is not very competitive.

== Ecology ==
Other plants growing in the same habitats include the pellitory-of-the-wall Parietaria lusitanica and the Mediterranean clubmoss (Selaginella denticulata) in northern Italy, and the clubmoss, the liverwort Targionia hypophylla and the mosses Rhynchostegiella tenella and Timmiella anomala in Elba. These plants are all heat-loving and are able to survive the winter by growing in locations where warm water seeps out of crevices, giving a tropical microclimate.
