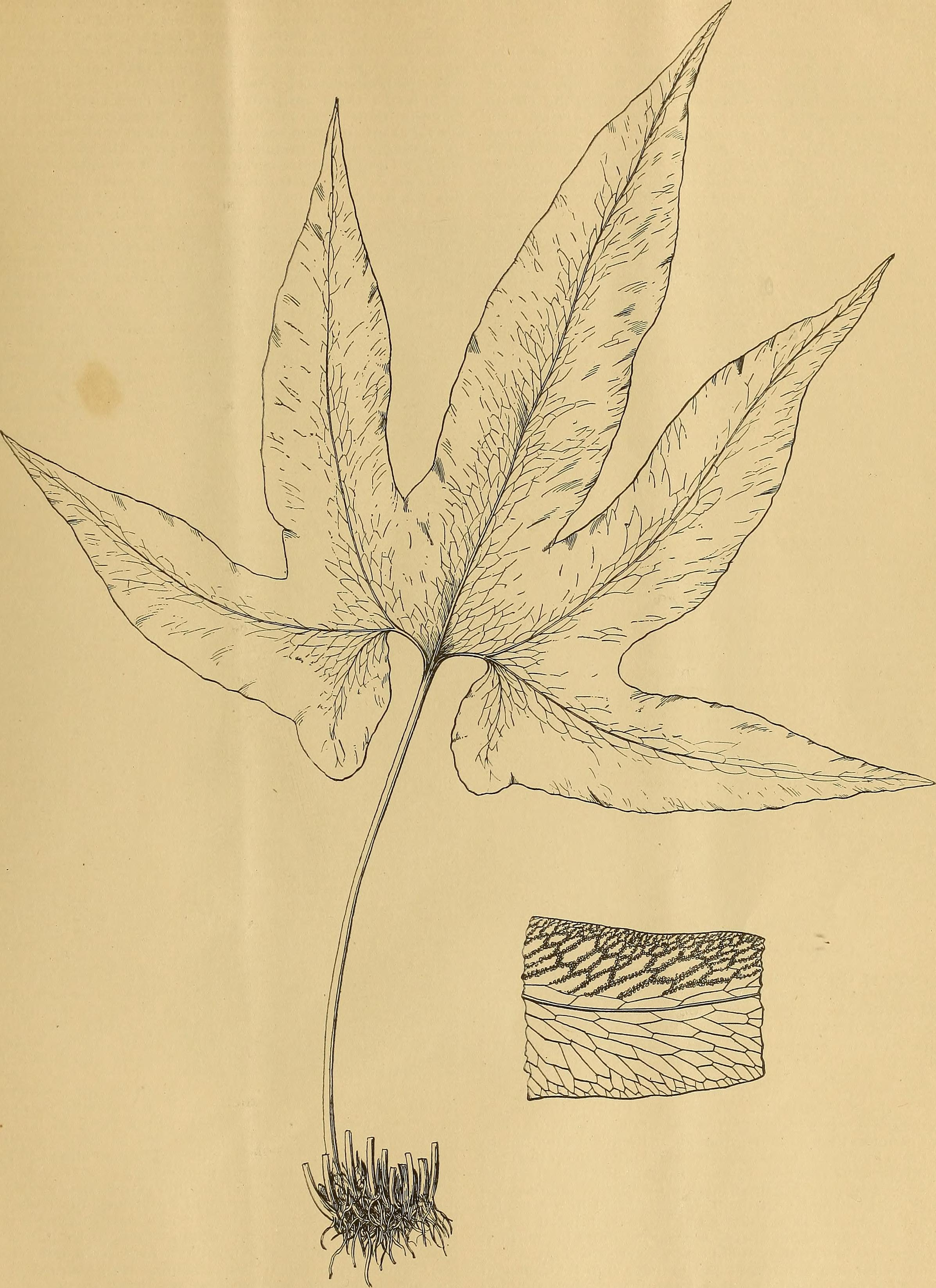

Scientific classification
- Kingdom: Plantae
- Clade: Tracheophytes
- Division: Polypodiophyta
- Class: Polypodiopsida
- Order: Polypodiales
- Family: Pteridaceae
- Genus: Bommeria
- Species: B. elegans

Binomial name
- Bommeria elegans (Davenp.) Ranker & Haufler, 1990

Synonyms
- Hemionitis elegans Davenp. 1891; Hemionitis hederifolia J. Sm. 1854; Dictyogramme hederifolia (J.Sm. 1854) Trevis. 1877

= Bommeria elegans =

Species of ferns

Bommeria elegans is a species of ferns, native to Mexico.
