= Calciphilopteris =

Scientific classification
- Kingdom: Plantae
- Clade: Tracheophytes
- Division: Polypodiophyta
- Class: Polypodiopsida
- Order: Polypodiales
- Family: Pteridaceae
- Subfamily: Cheilanthoideae
- Genus: Calciphilopteris; Yesilyurt & H.Schneider

Type species
- Calciphilopteris ludens (N.Wallich ex W.J.Hooker) Yesilyurt & H.Schneider

Species
- See text.

Genus of ferns

Calciphilopteris is a genus of ferns in the family Pteridaceae. It is native to India and China, southward to Australia. Its four species grow in crevices in limestone or they cling to the rock itself.

== Taxonomy ==
For a long time, the four species of Calciphilopteris were included in the polyphyletic genus Doryopteris. Molecular phylogenetic studies have shown that Calciphilopteris is the most basal clade in the subfamily Cheilanthoideae. It is thus far removed from Doryopteris palmata, the type species of Doryopteris.

Calciphilopteris was described as a new genus in 2010. The generic name is said to be derived from the Greek calx (limestone), philus (loving), and pteris (fern). Kalx can not be found in ancient Greek, however calx is the Latin word for "limestone", possibly derived from ancient Greek chalix (χάλιξ) or derived from a word from a different Mediterranean language. The proper word in ancient Greek for "loving" is philos (φίλος).

== Species ==
As of July 2026, the Checklist of Ferns and Lycophytes of the World recognized the following four species:

- Calciphilopteris alleniae (R.M.Tryon) Yesilyurt & H.Schneider
- Calciphilopteris ludens (Wall. ex Hook.) Yesilyurt & H.Schneider
- Calciphilopteris papuana (Copel.) Yesilyurt & H.Schneider
- Calciphilopteris wallichii (J.Sm.) Yesilyurt & H.Schneider
