= Goldback fern =

Goldback fern is a common name for several plants and may refer to:

- Pentagramma triangularis, native to western North America
- Pityrogramma
