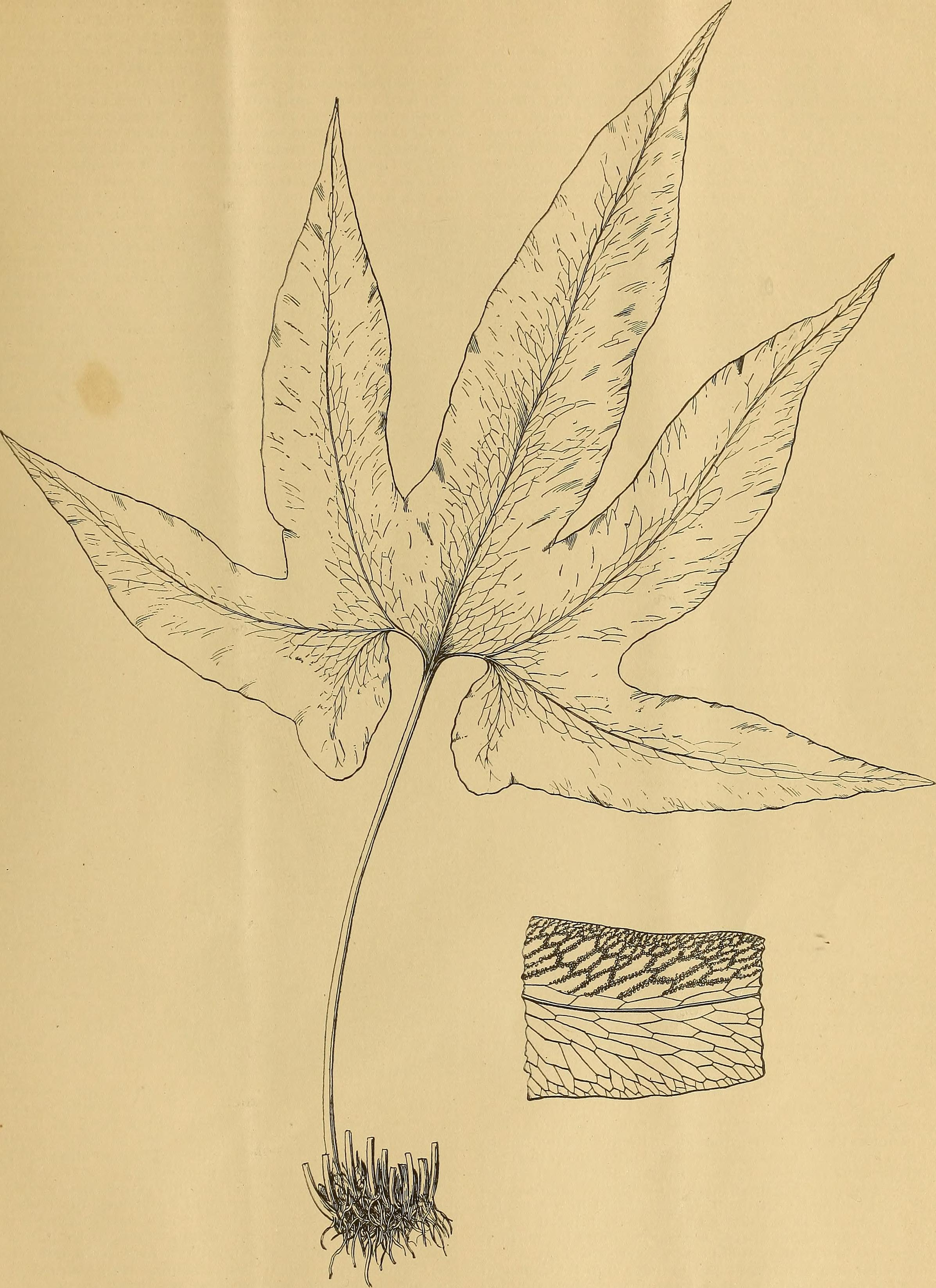
- Bommeria elegans

Scientific classification
- Kingdom: Plantae
- Clade: Tracheophytes
- Division: Polypodiophyta
- Class: Polypodiopsida
- Order: Polypodiales
- Family: Pteridaceae
- Subfamily: Cheilanthoideae
- Genus: Bommeria; Fourn.

Type species
- Bommeria ehrenbergiana (Klotzsch) Underwood

Species
- B. ehrenbergiana; B. elegans; B. hispida; B. pedata; B. subpaleacea

Synonyms
- Gymnopteris (Bommeria) (Fournier) Christ; Gymnogramma section Stenogramme Klotzsch

= Bommeria =

Genus of ferns

Bommeria is a genus of small pteridaceous rock ferns, native to the New World. Genetic analysis has shown it to be a stem offshoot clade of all the cheilanthoid ferns (in family Pteridaceae), except for Doryopteris, which is an even more basal ("primitive") stem offshoot. for years, it was assumed that this genus was closely allied with Hemionitis, but genetic analysis has shown that genus to be a more advanced genus evolutionarily. The same set of analysis has shown many presumed genera within this family to be paraphyletic, but the small genus Bommeria appears to be monophyletic, or a natural genus.

Bommeria is a "gymnogrammoid" fern, exhibiting unprotected sori aligned along veins on the undersides of the fronds. This is why it was assumed to be closely allied to Hemionitis. Such a feature is strongly at odds with most pteridoid ferns (Pteridaceae), which typically have linear marginal sori with an indusium, and sometimes protected with a reflexed leaf tissue margin. Apparently, this is a trait that can arise independently, and may be an atavistic trait.

The stipes (leaf stems) of Bommeria are hairy, with some scales, and the fronds are hairy, both above and below. The hairs above and short and sharp, while the hairs below may be straight or curled. Scales are also present on the bottoms of the fronds.

The genus name honors Belgian botanist Jean-Édouard Bommer. The basal chromosome number for this genus is 2n=60 (n=30).

== Phylogeny ==
As of January 2020, the Checklist of Ferns and Lycophytes of the World recognized the following species:

Phylogeny of Bommeria

- Bommeria
  - - B. hispida (Kuhn) Underw. (copper fern; Mexico, Arizona, New Mexico, Texas)
    - B. pedata (Sw.) E.Fourn. (western Mexico and Central America)
  - - B. ehrenbergiana (Klotzsch) Underw. (Mexico)
    - B. subpaleacea Maxon
