= Anthonya =

Anthonya is the scientific name of two genera of organisms and may refer to:

- Anthonya (bivalve), a genus of molluscs in the family Crassatellidae
- Anthonya (plant), a genus of ferns in the family Pteridaceae
