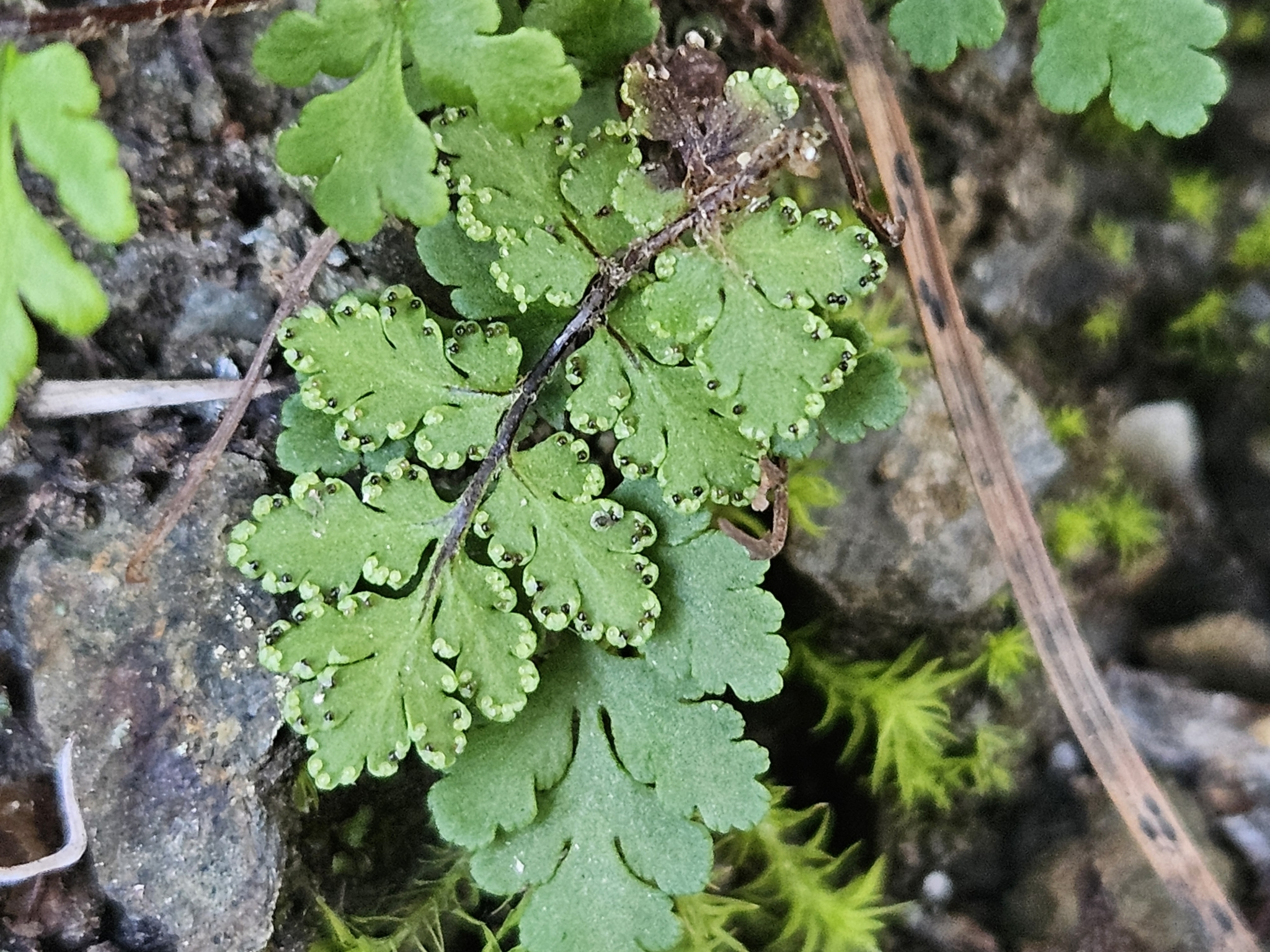

Scientific classification
- Kingdom: Plantae
- Clade: Tracheophytes
- Division: Polypodiophyta
- Class: Polypodiopsida
- Order: Polypodiales
- Family: Pteridaceae
- Genus: Oeosporangium
- Species: O. pteridioides

Binomial name
- Oeosporangium pteridioides (Reichard) Fraser-Jenk. & Pariyar

= Oeosporangium pteridioides =

Species of fern

Oeosporangium pteridioides (with many synonyms, including Hemionitis pteridioides) is a species of fern in the family Pteridaceae. Its native distribution is Macaronesia, around the Mediterranean in Europe, North Africa and Western Asia, and into the Sahara.

== Subspecies ==
As of January 2020, the Checklist of Ferns and Lycophytes of the World recognized three subspecies:

- Oeosporangium pteridioides subsp. pteridioides
- Oeosporangium pteridioides subsp. reichsteinii Fraser-Jenk. & Pariyar
- Oeosporangium pteridioides subsp. acrosticum (Balb.) Fraser-Jenk. & Pariyar, sometimes treated as a separate species (Oeosporangium acrosticum or Hemionitis acrostica)
