= Trachypteris (plant) =

Scientific classification
- Kingdom: Plantae
- Clade: Embryophytes
- Clade: Tracheophytes
- Division: Polypodiophyta
- Class: Polypodiopsida
- Order: Polypodiales
- Family: Pteridaceae
- Subfamily: Cheilanthoideae
- Genus: Trachypteris; André ex Christ

Species
- See text.

Genus of ferns

Trachypteris is a small genus of ferns in the subfamily Cheilanthoideae of the family Pteridaceae. Three species are native to the tropical South America, one (Trachypteris drakeana) to Madagascar.

== Species ==
As of July 2026, the Checklist of Ferns and Lycophytes of the World recognized the following species. T. drakeana is probably not closely related to the rest of the genus and is of uncertain placement.

- Trachypteris drakeana C.Chr.
- Trachypteris gilliana (Baker) Svenson
- Trachypteris induta (Maxon) R.M.Tryon & A.F.Tryon
- Trachypteris pinnata (Hook.f.) C.Chr.
