= Brasiliopteris =

Scientific classification
- Kingdom: Plantae
- Clade: Embryophytes
- Clade: Tracheophytes
- Division: Polypodiophyta
- Class: Polypodiopsida
- Order: Polypodiales
- Family: Pteridaceae
- Subfamily: Cheilanthoideae
- Genus: Brasiliopteris; J.Prado, Schuettp. & Yatsk.

Type species
- Brasiliopteris pohliana (Mett.) J.Prado, Schuettp. & Yatsk.

Species
- See text.

Genus of ferns

Brasiliopteris is a genus of cheilanthoid ferns described in 2025. Formerly classified in Cheilanthes, the species of the genus are all endemic to Brazil. Closely related to Mineirella, it is distinguished by its narrower and more highly divided leaf blades.

== Description ==
The species belonging to Brasiliopteris were formerly classified in Cheilanthes. They are most similar to Mineirella, another segregate from Cheilanthes. However, species of Brasiliopteris have a more highly dissected leaf blade which is not broadest at or near the base, the coating of hairs on the underside is not as dense as in Mineirella, and the divisions of the leaf are on short stalks, rather than fused at the base.

== Taxonomy ==
The genus was described by Jefferson Prado, Eric Schuettpelz, and George Yatskievych in 2025 as part of a major phylogenetic reclassification of the hemionitid ferns. While the species of the genus might be included in a broadly defined Cheilanthes, support for this clade is weak, and the authors and their collaborators preferred to recognize smaller genera with somewhat better morphological and geographic distinctions. Brasiliopteris forms a well-supported sister clade to Mineirella, but is significantly morphologically different, so it was defined as a new genus. The name of the genus reflects its occurrence in Brazil.

== Species ==
As of July 2026, two species are accepted in the genus by the Checklist of Ferns and Lycophytes of the World:

Binomial	Distribution	Image
Brasiliopteris pohliana (Mett.) J.Prado, Schuettp. & Yatsk.	central Brazil (Pará to Mato Grosso do Sul)	
Brasiliopteris regnelliana (Mett. ex Baker) J.Prado, Schuettp. & Yatsk.	Minas Gerais and São Paulo (Brazil)	

== Distribution and habitat ==
The genus is endemic to Brazil. The species are found in central Brazil, from Pará south to São Paulo.

== Notes and references ==
=== Works cited ===
- Hassler, Michael. "Brasiliopteris". World Ferns.
- Schuettpelz, Eric; Windham, Michael D.; Prado, Jefferson; Hooper, Elisabeth A.; Yatskievych, George; Huiet, Layne; Picard, Kathryn T.; Pryer, Kathleen M. (2025). "A phylogenetically informed generic reclassification of the hemionitid ferns (Pteridaceae: Cheilanthoideae)" (PDF). Taxon. 74 (2): 260–291. doi:10.1002/tax.13314.
