= Pteridales =

Order of ferns

The Pteridales were an order of ferns that have their sori in linear strips under the edge of the leaf tissue, usually with the edge of the lamina reflexed over.

This order was reduced to the family Pteridaceae under the Smith classification of 2006, a position maintained in the Pteridophyte Phylogeny Group classification of 2016 (PPG I).
