= Anthonya (plant) =

Scientific classification
- Kingdom: Plantae
- Clade: Embryophytes
- Clade: Tracheophytes
- Division: Polypodiophyta
- Class: Polypodiopsida
- Order: Polypodiales
- Family: Pteridaceae
- Subfamily: Cheilanthoideae
- Genus: Anthonya; Windham & Pryer

Type species
- Anthonya hirta (Sw.) Windham & Pryer

Species
- See text.

Genus of ferns in the family Pteridaceae

Anthonya is a genus of cheilanthoid ferns described in 2025. Formerly classified in Cheilanthes, the species of the genus are all native to Africa (including Madagascar), with a center of diversity in South Africa. Their hairy or sticky leaf blades help distinguish them from most other cheilanthoid ferns in the region.

== Description ==
The species belonging to Anthonya were formerly classified in Cheilanthes. They are distinguished from the latter genus, when narrowly circumscribed, by having 64 rather than 32 spores per sporangium, or by having 32 spores that are greater than 57 μm in diameter, those of Cheilanthes being smaller.

Within their range, they are similar to three other genera segregated from Cheilanthes, Namaquapteris, Choristosoria, and Pellaeopsis. Species of Anthonya generally have hairy or sticky leaf blades and round rachides, while Namaquapteris and Choristosoria generally have glabrous leaf blades and grooved rachides. They also typically have dark, hard rhizome scales while those of Namaquapteris are more flexible and lighter in color. The sori of Anthonya are broken into short discontinuous segments on the lobes of the ultimate leaf divisions, while those of Pellaeopsis are long and continuous around the margin of the leaf.

== Taxonomy ==
The genus was described by Michael D. Windham and Kathleen M. Pryer in 2025 as part of a major phylogenetic reclassification of the hemionitid ferns. While the species of the genus might be included in a broadly defined Cheilanthes or in an African subclade of Cheilanthes together with Namaquapteris, support for both of these clades is weak, and Windham, Pryer and their collaborators preferred to recognize smaller general with somewhat better morphological and geographic distinctions. The genus is named for the botanist Nicola C. Anthony, who produced a highly detailed study of South African cheilanthoids that facilitated the new classification.

== Species ==
As of July 2026, eleven species are accepted in the genus by the Checklist of Ferns and Lycophytes of the World:

Binomial	Distribution	Image
Anthonya bergiana (Schltdl.) Windham & Pryer	Tropical and southern Africa, Madagascar	
Anthonya ceterachoides (A.W.Klopper & Klopper) Windham & Pryer	Limpopo (South Africa)	
Anthonya contracta (Kunze) Windham & Pryer	South Africa	
Anthonya depauperata (Baker) Windham & Pryer	South Africa	
Anthonya dinteri (Brause) Windham & Pryer	Angola and Namibia	
Anthonya eckloniana (Kunze) Windham & Pryer	Southern Africa	
Anthonya hirta (Sw.) Windham & Pryer	Tropical and southern Africa, Madagascar, Mascarene Islands	
Anthonya hyaloglandulosa (W.Jacobsen & N.H.G.Jacobsen) Windham & Pryer	South Africa	
Anthonya marlothii (Hieron.) Windham & Pryer	Angola, Namibia, South Africa	
Anthonya nielsii (W.Jacobsen) Windham & Pryer	Namibia, South Africa	
Anthonya parviloba (Sw.) Windham & Pryer	Zimbabwe, Namibia, South Africa	

== Distribution and habitat ==
The center of diversity for the genus is in South Africa, with three endemic species. Two species extend as far north as Kenya and Ethiopia and east to Madagascar. One of these ranges west as far as the Democratic Republic of the Congo and east to the Mascarene Islands.

== Notes and references ==
=== Works cited ===
- Hassler, Michael. "Anthonya". World Ferns.
- Schuettpelz, Eric; Windham, Michael D.; Prado, Jefferson; Hooper, Elisabeth A.; Yatskievych, George; Huiet, Layne; Picard, Kathryn T.; Pryer, Kathleen M. (2025). "A phylogenetically informed generic reclassification of the hemionitid ferns (Pteridaceae: Cheilanthoideae)" (PDF). Taxon. 74 (2): 260–291. doi:10.1002/tax.13314.
