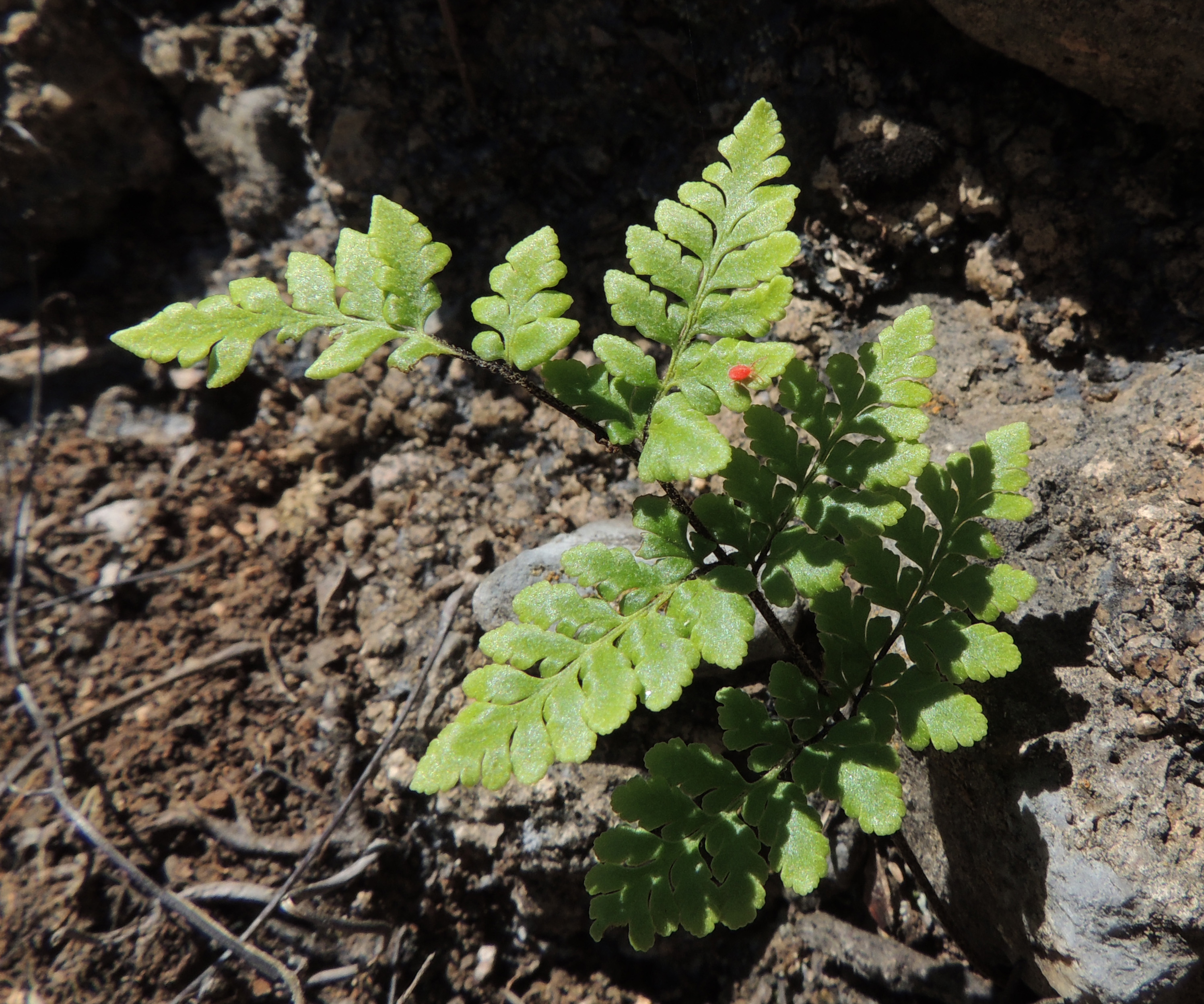

Scientific classification
- Kingdom: Plantae
- Clade: Embryophytes
- Clade: Tracheophytes
- Division: Polypodiophyta
- Class: Polypodiopsida
- Order: Polypodiales
- Family: Pteridaceae
- Subfamily: Cheilanthoideae
- Genus: Cheiloplecton; Fée
- Species: C. rigidum

Binomial name
- Cheiloplecton rigidum (Sw.) Fée

Synonyms
- Allosorus cartilagineus (C.Presl) C.Presl; Allosorus rigidus (Sw.) C.Presl; Cheilanthes rigida (Sw.) Moore ex Fée; Doryopteris rigida (Sw.) Diels; Hemionitis cheiloplecton Christenh.; Pellaea rigida (Sw.) Hook.; Pteris acutangula Nees; Pteris cartilaginea C.Presl; Pteris rigida Sw.

= Cheiloplecton =

Species of fern in Central America

Cheiloplecton is a genus of ferns in the subfamily Cheilanthoideae of the family Pteridaceae with a single species Cheiloplecton rigidum, native to Mexico, Guatemala, El Salvador and Honduras.
