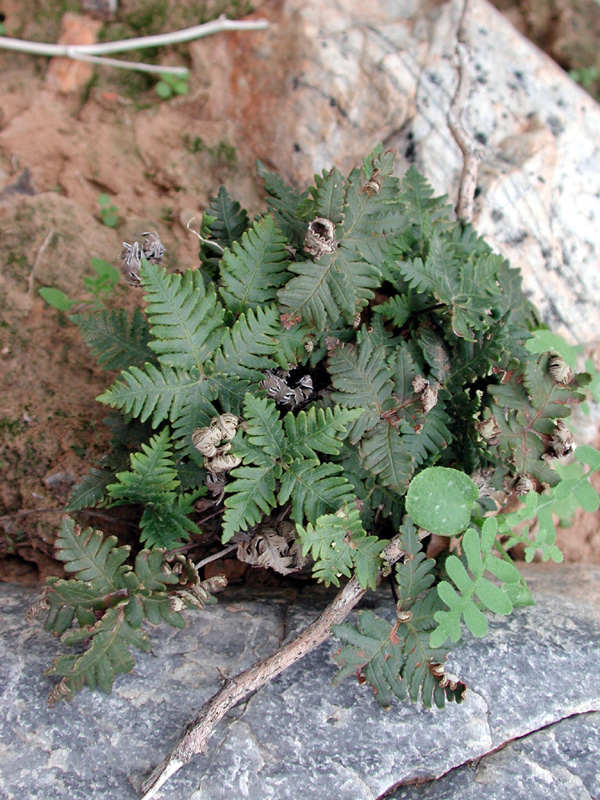
- Notholaena standleyi

Scientific classification
- Kingdom: Plantae
- Clade: Embryophytes
- Clade: Tracheophytes
- Division: Polypodiophyta
- Class: Polypodiopsida
- Order: Polypodiales
- Family: Pteridaceae
- Subfamily: Cheilanthoideae
- Genus: Notholaena; R.Br.

Species
- See text.

= Notholaena =

Genus of ferns

Notholaena is a genus of ferns known as cloak ferns in the family Pteridaceae. Species of this genus are mostly epipetric (growing on rock) or occurring in coarse, gravelly soils, and are most abundant and diverse in the mountain ranges of warm arid or semiarid regions. They typically have a creeping or erect rhizome and leaves that are pinnatifid to pinnate-pinnatifid with marginal sori protected by a false indusium formed from the reflexed margin of the leaf. Members of the genus Notholaena also has a coating of whitish or yellowish farina (a powdery secretion of lipophilic exudates), primarily on the abaxial (lower) surface of the leaves and along the margin of prothallium of gametophytes. Members of the related genera including Aleuritopteris, Argyrochosma, Pentagramma, as well as several genera and species in other subfamilies of Pteridaceae, also exhibit farina on the lower leaf surface. Meanwhile, gametophytic farina is almost exclusively observed in Notholaena, with only occasional spontaneous occurrences reported in Argyrochosma and Aleuritopteris.

The similar genus Argyrochosma also has farinose leaves, but in that genus the ultimate segments of the leaves have entire margins and are distinctly stalked, whereas in Notholaena the ultimate segments are usually lobed or pinnatifid and sessile or subsessile. Notholaena has in the past been used as a "catch-all" genus for a wide variety of species that did not fit well in other arid fern genera but it has more recently been defined in a much narrower sense, making the genus much more morphologically and evolutionarily coherent. The genera Argyrochosma and Astrolepis were recently segregated from Notholaena, and other former members of Notholaena are now in the genus Cheilanthes.

== Etymology ==
The genus was first described in 1810 by Robert Brown. The name is derived from the Greek νόθος (nothos), "false", and χλαῖνα (chlaena), "cloak". This refers to the fact that the sori are not covered by well-differentiated tissue of the leaf margin.

Members of the genus Notholaena as historically defined, are commonly known as "cloak ferns".

== Species ==
As of July 2026, the Checklist of Ferns and Lycophytes of the World recognized the following thirty-four species:

- Notholaena affinis (Mett.) T.Moore
- Notholaena aliena Maxon
- Notholaena aschenborniana Klotzsch
- Notholaena aurantiaca Eaton
- Notholaena aureolina Yatsk. & Arbeláez
- Notholaena brachycaulis Mickel
- Notholaena brachypus (Kunze) J.Sm.
- Notholaena brevistipes Mickel
- Notholaena bryopoda Maxon
- Notholaena californica D.C.Eaton
- Notholaena candida (M.Martens & Galeotti) Hook.
- Notholaena cubensis Weath. ex R.M.Tryon
- Notholaena ekmanii Maxon
- Notholaena galapagensis Weath. & Svenson ex Svenson
- Notholaena galeottii Fée
- Notholaena grayi Davenp.
- Notholaena greggii (Mett. ex Kuhn) Maxon
- Notholaena jacalensis Pray
- Notholaena jaliscana Yatsk. & Arbeláez
- Notholaena lemmonii D.C.Eaton
- Notholaena leonina Maxon
- Notholaena meridionalis Mickel
- Notholaena montielae Yatsk. & Arbeláez
- Notholaena neglecta Maxon
- Notholaena ochracea (Hook.) Yatsk. & Arbeláez
- Notholaena revoluta A.Rojas
- Notholaena rigida Davenp.
- Notholaena rosei Maxon
- Notholaena schaffneri (E.Fourn.) Underw.
- Notholaena solitaria R.M.Tryon
- Notholaena standleyi (Kümmerle) Maxon
- Notholaena sulphurea (Cav.) J.Sm.
- Notholaena trichomanoides (L.) R.Br.
- Notholaena weatherbiana R.M.Tryon

== Sources ==
- Brown, Robert (1810). Prodromus floræ Novæ Hollandiæ et Insulæ Van-Diemen. London: R. Taylor et socii.
- Clute, Willard N. (1901). Our Ferns in Their Haunts. New York: Frederick A. Stokes Co.
- Quattrocchi, Umberto (2019). CRC World Dictionary of Plant Names. Vol. III. Boca Raton, Florida: CRC Press. ISBN 978-0-3674-4751-9.
