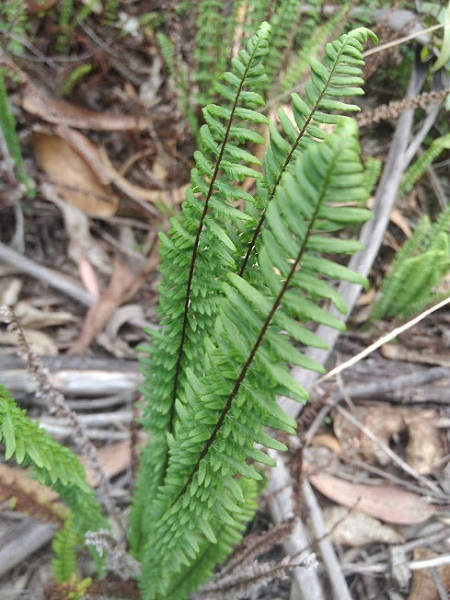
- Adiantopsis lindigii

Scientific classification
- Kingdom: Plantae
- Clade: Embryophytes
- Clade: Tracheophytes
- Division: Polypodiophyta
- Class: Polypodiopsida
- Order: Polypodiales
- Family: Pteridaceae
- Subfamily: Cheilanthoideae
- Genus: Adiantopsis; Fée

Species
- See text.

= Adiantopsis =

Genus of ferns

Adiantopsis is a genus of ferns in the subfamily Cheilanthoideae of the family Pteridaceae.

== Species ==
As of May 2024, the Checklist of Ferns and Lycophytes of the World recognized the following thirty-three species and one hybrid:

- Adiantopsis alata Prantl
- Adiantopsis asplenioides Maxon
- Adiantopsis aurea Link-Pérez, Seabolt & Ledford
- Adiantopsis × australopedata Hickey, M.S.Barker & Ponce
- Adiantopsis cheilanthoides R.M.Senna
- Adiantopsis chlorophylla (Sw.) Fée
- Adiantopsis crinoidea Link-Pérez & Hickey
- Adiantopsis dactylifera Link-Pérez & Hickey
- Adiantopsis dichotoma (Cav.) Moore
- Adiantopsis flexuosa (Kunze) Link-Pérez & Hickey
- Adiantopsis hickeyi Link-Pérez, Seabolt & Ledford
- Adiantopsis lindigii (Mett.) Prantl
- Adiantopsis luetzelburgii Rosenst.
- Adiantopsis monticola (Gardner) Moore
- Adiantopsis occulta Sehnem
- Adiantopsis orbignyana (Mett. ex Kuhn) Ponce & Scataglini
- Adiantopsis parvisegmenta M.S.Barker & Hickey
- Adiantopsis paupercula (Kunze) Fée
- Adiantopsis pedata (Hook.) Moore
- Adiantopsis pentagona M.S.Barker & Hickey
- Adiantopsis perfasciculata Sehnem
- Adiantopsis propinqua (Mett.) Prantl
- Adiantopsis radiata (L.) Fée
- Adiantopsis recurvata (Baker) Ponce & Scataglini
- Adiantopsis reesii (Jenman) C.Chr.
- Adiantopsis regularis (Mett.) T.Moore
- Adiantopsis rupicola Maxon
- Adiantopsis scalariformis Link-Pérez, Seabolt & Ledford
- Adiantopsis seemannii (Hook.) Maxon
- Adiantopsis senae (Baker) Schuettp. & A.Davila
- Adiantopsis timida Link-Pérez & Hickey
- Adiantopsis trifurcata (Baker) Link-Pérez & Hickey
- Adiantopsis tweedieana (Hook.) Link-Pérez & Hickey
- Adiantopsis vincentii M.S.Barker & Hickey
