= Ceratopteridaceae =

Family of ferns

Ceratopteridaceae is an improper family name for the clade that is now known to include the two genera Ceratopteris and Acrostichum. Although Ceratopteris was long isolated under its own family, due to adaptations for a dedicated aquatic existence, recent genetic study has determined that these two genera are allied.

The correct name for this taxon at the level of family is Parkeriaceae; in the Pteridophyte Phylogeny Group classification of 2016 (PPG I), it is treated as the subfamily Parkerioideae.

Christenhusz et al., 2011, included these two genera alone in the subfamily Ceratopteridoideae (now the Parkerioideae) in their larger treatment of the family Pteridaceae in the order Polypodiales.
