= Ormopteris =

Scientific classification
- Kingdom: Plantae
- Clade: Embryophytes
- Clade: Tracheophytes
- Division: Polypodiophyta
- Class: Polypodiopsida
- Order: Polypodiales
- Family: Pteridaceae
- Subfamily: Cheilanthoideae
- Genus: Ormopteris; J.Sm.

Species
- See text.

Genus of ferns

Ormopteris is a genus of ferns in the subfamily Cheilanthoideae of the family Pteridaceae. Species are native to Brazil and Venezuela.

== Species ==
As of July 2026, the Checklist of Ferns and Lycophytes of the World recognized the following five species:

- Ormopteris crenata (R.M.Tryon) Barbará
- Ormopteris cymbiformis (J.Prado) Barbará
- Ormopteris gleichenioides (Gardner) J.Sm.
- Ormopteris pinnata (Kaulf.) Lellinger
- Ormopteris riedelii (Baker) Barbará
