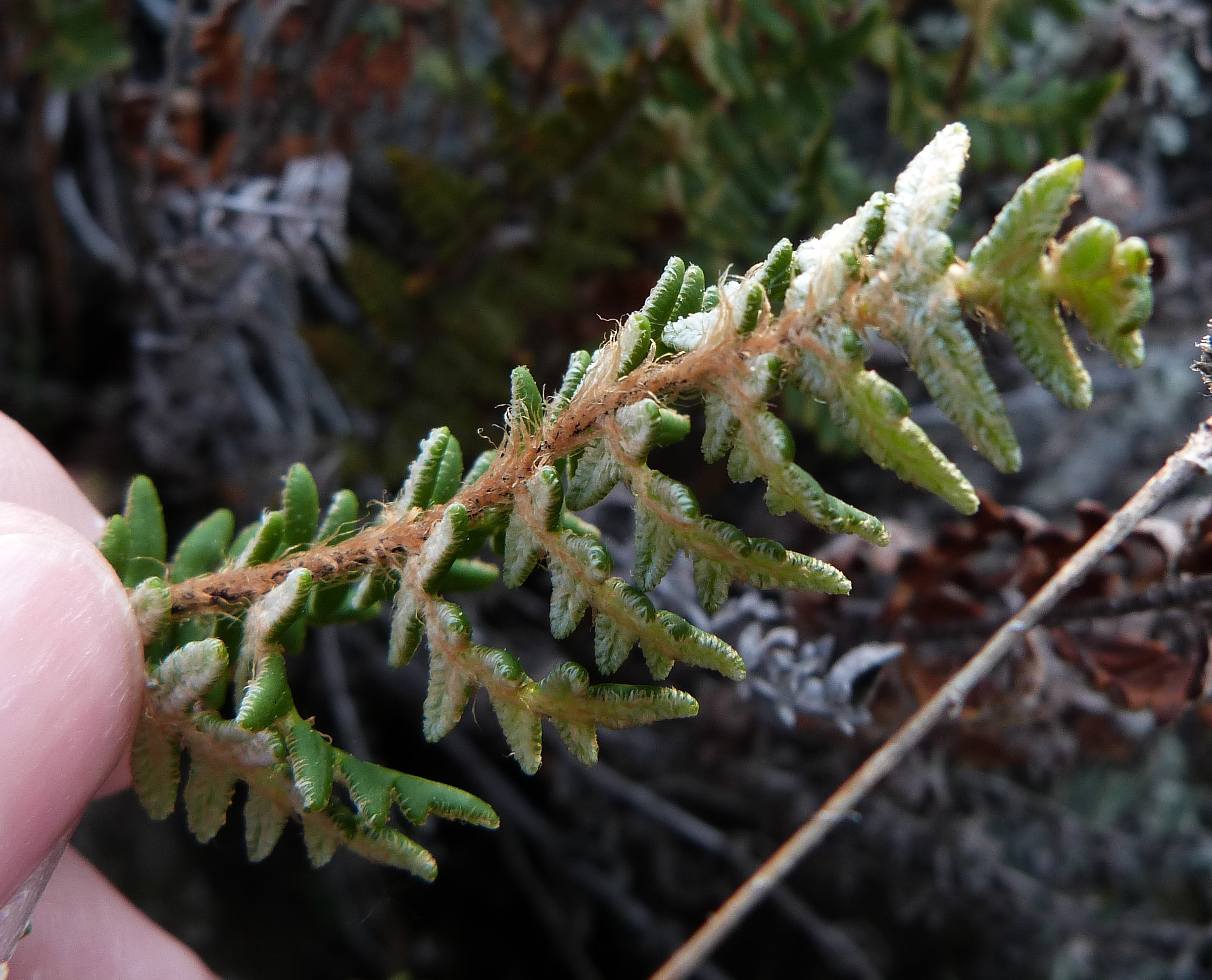
- Paragymnopteris marantae

Scientific classification
- Kingdom: Plantae
- Clade: Tracheophytes
- Division: Polypodiophyta
- Class: Polypodiopsida
- Order: Polypodiales
- Family: Pteridaceae
- Subfamily: Cheilanthoideae
- Genus: Paragymnopteris; K.H.Shing

Species
- See text.

Synonyms
- Paraceterach (F.Muell.) Copel.; Parahemionitis Panigrahi

= Paragymnopteris =

Genus of ferns

Paragymnopteris is a genus of ferns in the subfamily Cheilanthoideae of the family Pteridaceae. Species of Paragymnopteris are native to the Old World.

== Species ==
As of January 2020, the Checklist of Ferns and Lycophytes of the World recognized the following species:

- Paragymnopteris bipinnata (Christ) K.H.Shing
- Paragymnopteris borealisinensis (Kitag.) comb. ined.
- Paragymnopteris delavayi (Baker) K.H.Shing
- Paragymnopteris marantae (L.) K.H.Shing
- Paragymnopteris sargentii (Christ) K.H.Shing
- Paragymnopteris vestita (Wall. ex C.Presl) K.H.Shing
