= Lytoneuron =

Scientific classification
- Kingdom: Plantae
- Clade: Embryophytes
- Clade: Tracheophytes
- Division: Polypodiophyta
- Class: Polypodiopsida
- Order: Polypodiales
- Family: Pteridaceae
- Subfamily: Cheilanthoideae
- Genus: Lytoneuron (Klotzsch) Yesilyurt

Species
- See text.

Synonyms
- Doryopteris sect. Lytoneuron Klotzsch

Genus of ferns

Lytoneuron is a genus of ferns in the subfamily Cheilanthoideae of the family Pteridaceae. Species are native to South America, many to Brazil.

== Species ==
As of July 2026, the Checklist of Ferns and Lycophytes of the World recognized the following seventeen species:

- Lytoneuron acutilobum (Prantl) Yesilyurt
- Lytoneuron bradei (Rosenst.) Yesilyurt
- Lytoneuron columbinum (Hook.) Yesilyurt
- Lytoneuron crenulans (Fée) Yesilyurt
- Lytoneuron feei (Brade) Yesilyurt
- Lytoneuron itatiaiense (Fée) Yesilyurt
- Lytoneuron lomariaceum (Klotzsch) Yesilyurt
- Lytoneuron magdalenense (Brade) Yesilyurt
- Lytoneuron microphyllum (Christ) Yesilyurt
- Lytoneuron ornithopus (Hook.) Yesilyurt
- Lytoneuron paradoxum (Fée) Yesilyurt
- Lytoneuron poseidonii Smith-Braga & Schwartsburd
- Lytoneuron quinquelobatum (Fée) Yesilyurt
- Lytoneuron rosenstockii (Brade) Yesilyurt
- Lytoneuron rufum (Brade) Yesilyurt
- Lytoneuron subsimplex (Fée) Yesilyurt
- Lytoneuron tijucanum (Brade) Yesilyurt
