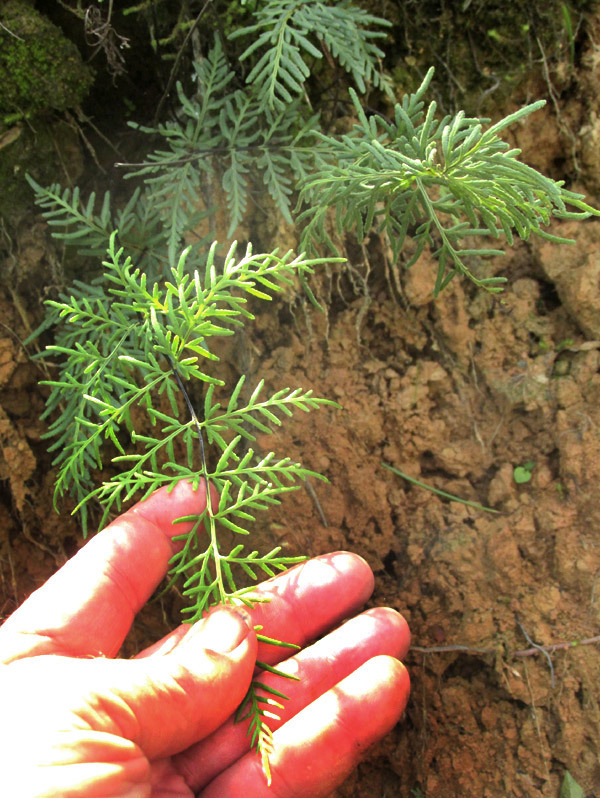

Scientific classification
- Kingdom: Plantae
- Clade: Tracheophytes
- Division: Polypodiophyta
- Class: Polypodiopsida
- Order: Polypodiales
- Family: Pteridaceae
- Genus: Hemionitis
- Species: H. fallax

Binomial name
- Hemionitis fallax (M.Martens & Galeotti) ined.

Synonyms
- Mildella fallax (M.Martens & Galeotti) G.L.Nesom; Mildella intramarginalis var. serratifolia (Hook. & Baker) C.C.Hall & Lellinger; Pellaea intramarginalis var. serratifolia Hook. & Baker; Pteris fallax M.Martens & Galeotti

= Hemionitis fallax =

Species of ferns

Hemionitis fallax is a species of maidenhair fern in the family Pteridaceae.

== Description ==
As with most other members of its family, this fern's spore-producing sori develop along the margins of the many-divided leaves' undersurfaces, where the margins are reflexed, providing shelter for the sori. These underturned fern-leaf margins are usually referred to as "false indusia".

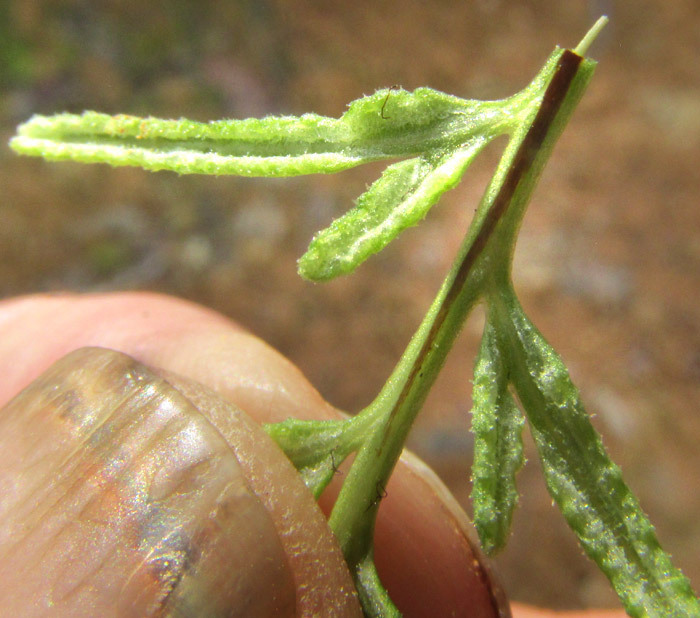
False indusia on leaf underside

In highland central Mexico, Hemionitis fallax differs from a second Mexican species, H. intramarginalis, in that the underturned margins of H fallax are roughly serrate, or saw-toothed, while the underturned margins of H. intramarginalis are only slightly saw-toothed, or serrulate.

== Distribution and habitat ==
Hemionitis fallax is found from Sinaloa and Tamaulipas in northern Mexico to northern Guatemala.

Hemionitis fallax occurs in rocky areas and ravines, in forests of oak, oak-pine, fir, tropical deciduous, mesophytic forests in the mountains, and pasturelands.

== Taxonomy ==
Hemionitis fallax was first described in the genus Pteris in 1842, and has also been considered by some taxonomists as a subspecies of Hemionitis intramarginalis. Modern taxonomists are not all in agreement as to which genus this taxon belongs, with some authorities not yet recognising the synonymy of the genera Mildella or Aleuritopteris with the genus Hemionitis
