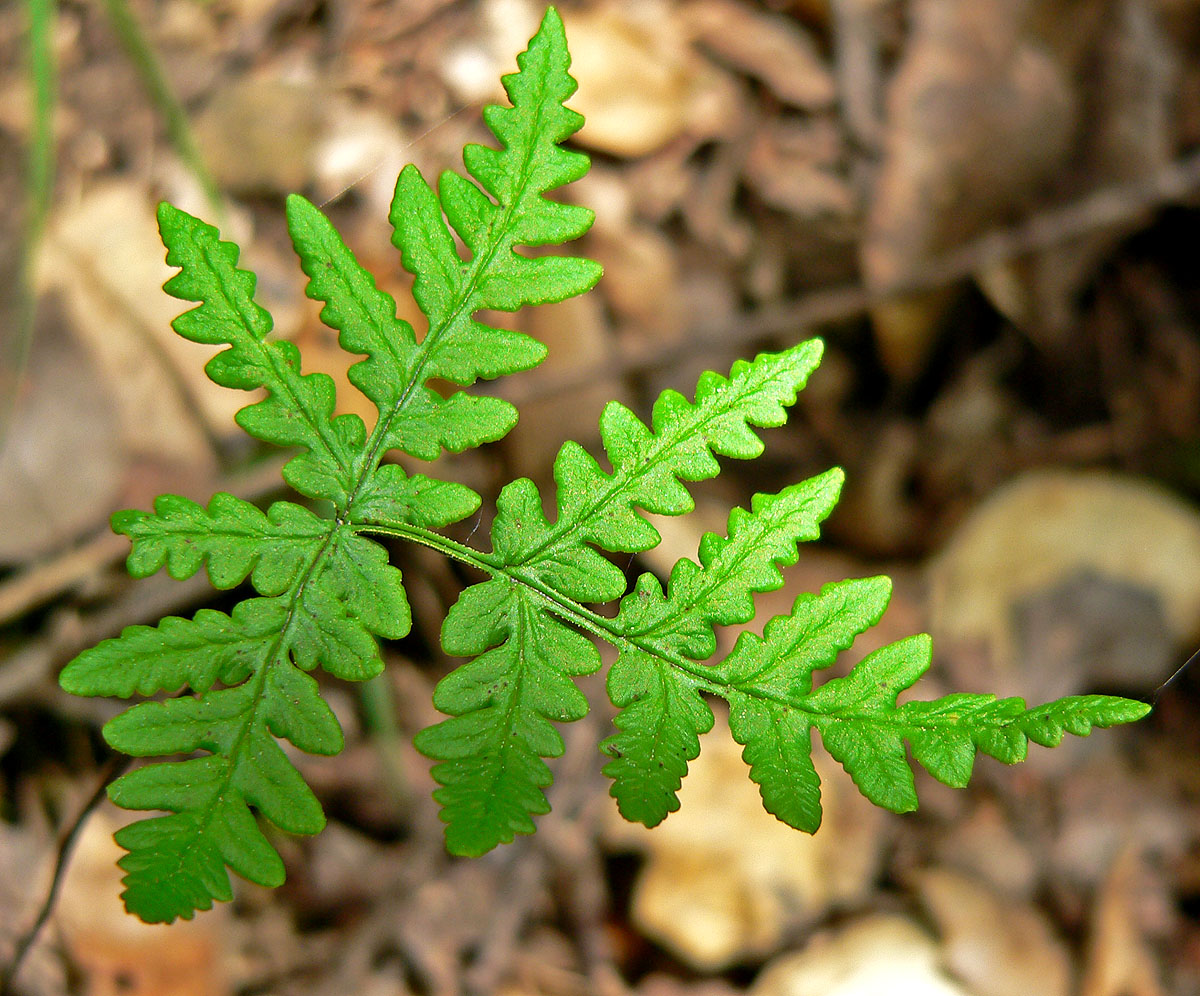
- Pentagramma triangularis

Scientific classification
- Kingdom: Plantae
- Clade: Embryophytes
- Clade: Tracheophytes
- Division: Polypodiophyta
- Class: Polypodiopsida
- Order: Polypodiales
- Family: Pteridaceae
- Subfamily: Cheilanthoideae
- Genus: Pentagramma; Yatsk., Windham & E.Wollenw.

Species
- See text.

= Pentagramma =

Genus of ferns

Pentagramma is a small genus of North American ferns in the family Pteridaceae. Until 1990 members of this genus were included in Pityrogramma, and there has been considerable disagreement regarding the species' taxonomy. In the most recent treatment, six diploid species are recognized.

The distribution of P. triangularis (goldback fern) extends from British Columbia through the western United States into Baja California in northwestern Mexico. Pentagramma maxonii occurs in New Mexico, Arizona, Sonora, Baja California Sur, California, and Baja California. All other species are restricted to California and Baja California.

Members of the genus Pentagramma produce a powdery-waxy secretion on their lower leaf surfaces, called farina. This character is shared with the related genus Notholaenaand other members of the Cheilanthoideae.

== Species ==
As of July 2026, the Checklist of Ferns and Lycophytes of the World recognized the following six species:

- Pentagramma glanduloviscida Schuettp. & Windham
- Pentagramma maxonii (Weath.) Schuettp. & Windham
- Pentagramma pallida (Weath.) Yatsk., Windham & E. Wollenw.
- Pentagramma rebmanii (Winner & M. G. Simpson) Schuettp. & Windham
- Pentagramma triangularis (Kaulf.) Yatsk., Windham & E. Wollenw.
- Pentagramma viscosa (Nutt. ex D. C. Eaton) Schuettp. & Windham
