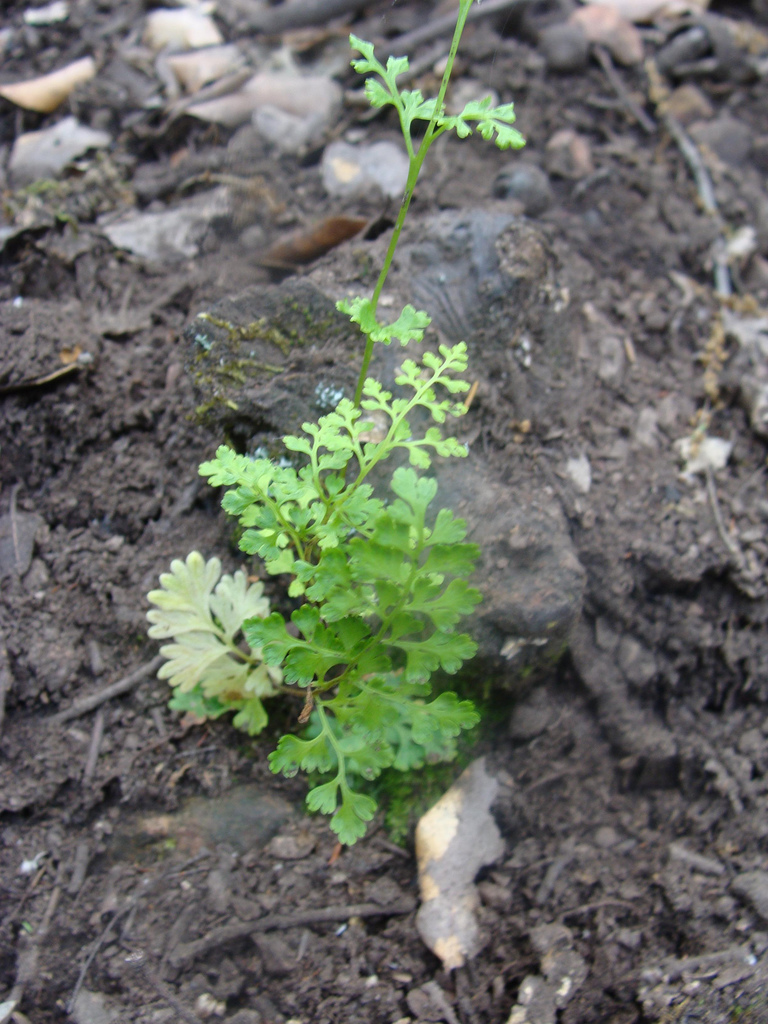
- A. leptophylla

Scientific classification
- Kingdom: Plantae
- Clade: Embryophytes
- Clade: Tracheophytes
- Division: Polypodiophyta
- Class: Polypodiopsida
- Order: Polypodiales
- Family: Pteridaceae
- Subfamily: Pteridoideae
- Genus: Anogramma; Link

Type species
- Anogramma leptophylla (L.) Link

Species
- See text

Synonyms
- Dicranodium Newman

= Anogramma =

Genus of ferns

Anogramma is a genus of ferns in the subfamily Pteridoideae of the family Pteridaceae. It contains three accepted species:

- Anogramma leptophylla (L.) Link (Annual/Jersey fern)
- Anogramma lorentzii (Hieron.) Diels
- Anogramma reichsteinii Fraser-Jenk.
