= Baja brandegeei =

Scientific classification
- Kingdom: Plantae
- Clade: Tracheophytes
- Division: Polypodiophyta
- Class: Polypodiopsida
- Order: Polypodiales
- Family: Pteridaceae
- Subfamily: Cheilanthoideae
- Genus: Baja; Windham & L.O.George
- Species: B. brandegeei

Binomial name
- Baja brandegeei (Eaton) Windham & L.O.George

Synonyms
- Cheilanthes brandegeei D.C.Eaton; Hemionitis brandegeei (D.C.Eaton) Christenh.

Genus of ferns

Baja is a genus of ferns in the subfamily Cheilanthoideae of the family Pteridaceae with a single species Baja brandegeei, synonym Cheilanthes brandegeei. The species is native to Baja California including the offshore Cedros Island, Mexico.

== Description ==
The fronds of Baja brandegeei arise in clumps from a scaly, compact horizontal rhizome 2 to 3 millimeters (0.08 to 0.1 in) in diameter. The scales are 3 to 4 millimeters (0.1 to 0.2 in) long, linear-lanceolate in shape, lacking teeth, and of a uniform orange-tan color.

The fronds are up to 20 centimeters (8 in) long, about one-third of the length being the stipe (leaf stalk below the blade). The stipes are rounded, without a groove on the supper surface, lack hairs, and are a shiny chestnut-brown color. The leaf blades are triangular to pentagonal in shape, and are from 6 to 7 centimeters (2 to 3 in) wide. The thin-textured leaf blades are usually bipinnate-pinnatifid (cut into pinnae with deeply lobed pinnules) to tripinnate (cut into pinnae, pinnules, and pinnulets) at the base. Each leaf has 5 to 7 pairs of pinnae, those at the base being somewhat inequilateral. The ultimate divisions of the leaf are ovate and rounded at their tips. The upper surface of the blade bears a few hairs 0.2 to 0.3 millimeters (0.008 to 0.01 in) long, while the lower surface has scattered one-celled white hairs that are slightly longer (0.3 to 0.5 millimeters (0.01 to 0.02 in)).

On fertile fronds, the leaf margins are curved to cover the sori and deeply lobed. These false indusia are similar in texture and appearance to the rest of the leaf. The spores are brown.
