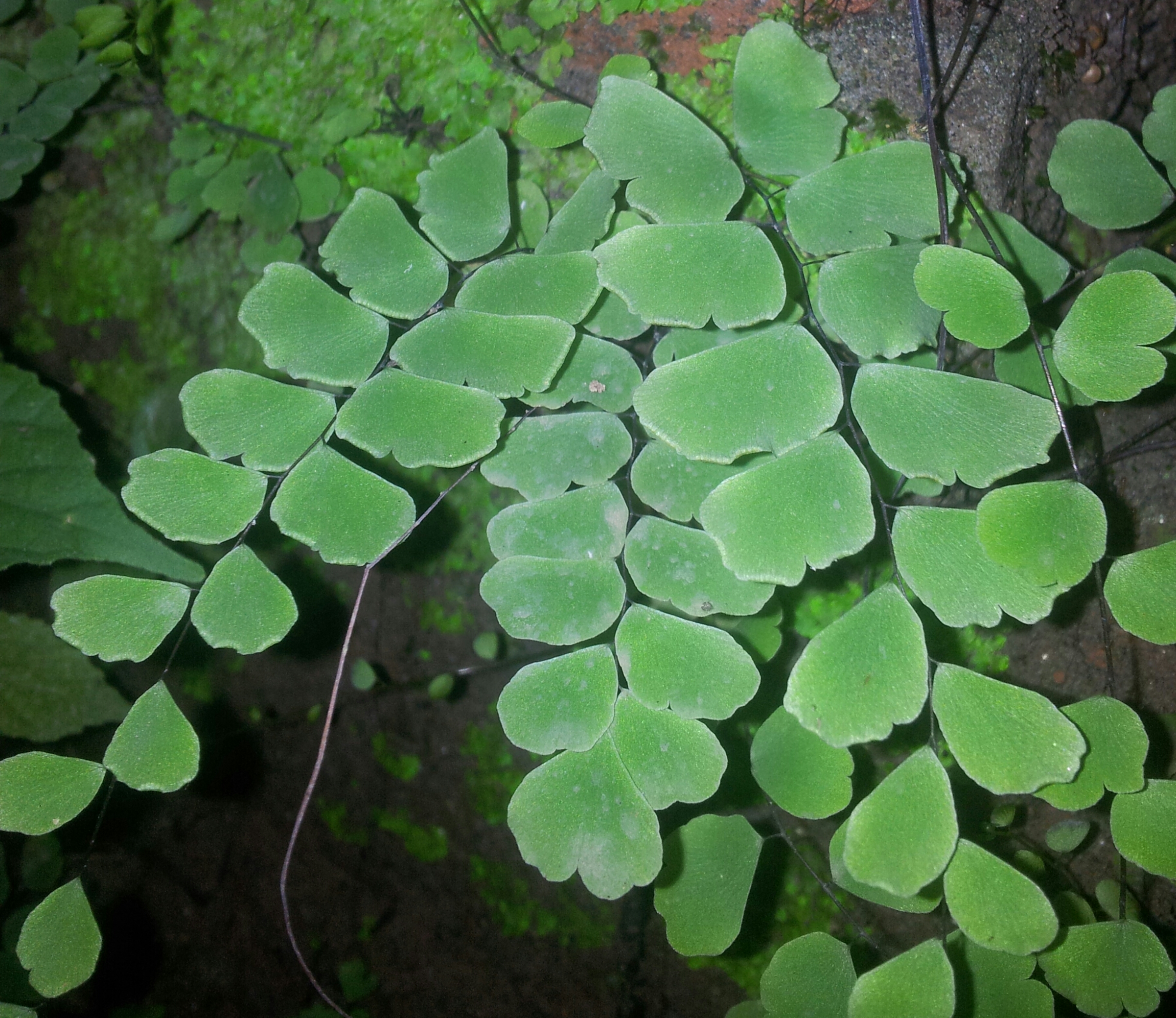
- Frond

Scientific classification
- Kingdom: Plantae
- Clade: Embryophytes
- Clade: Tracheophytes
- Division: Polypodiophyta
- Class: Polypodiopsida
- Order: Polypodiales
- Family: Pteridaceae
- Genus: Adiantum
- Species: A. philippense

Binomial name
- Adiantum philippense L.

= Adiantum philippense =

Species of fern

Adiantum philippense, also known as walking maidenhair fern, or black maidenhair, is a species of maidenhair fern (Adiantum) that is widely distributed through the southern hemisphere, notably Asia, Africa, and Madagascar.

== Taxonomy ==
The species was named by Carl Linnaeus in 1753. It was lectotypified by R.E.G. Pichi-Sermolli in 1957 based on an illustration by James Petiver. The identifiability of this illustration was disputed, leading some authorities to deprecate A. philippense as a nomen dubium and use the next available name for the taxon, Adiantum lunulatum Burm.f.. Burman conferred this specific epithet based on its half-moon shaped pinnae. However, Christopher Fraser-Jenkins located the original material and drawing of the lectotype sent to Petiver by Georg Joseph Kamel in the Sloane Herbarium, making clear the application of the name A. philippense.

== Description ==
Adiantum philippense grows in a creeping or semi-erect position. Its fronds are arched and tufted. The fern is notably overall very glabrous and smooth. It grows on streambanks, often on rocks in forests and woodland.

== Distribution ==
Adiantum philippense can be found across south-east Asia. It inhabits tropical areas in Bangladesh, India, Nepal, Thailand, Philippines and Cambodia.

== Gallery ==
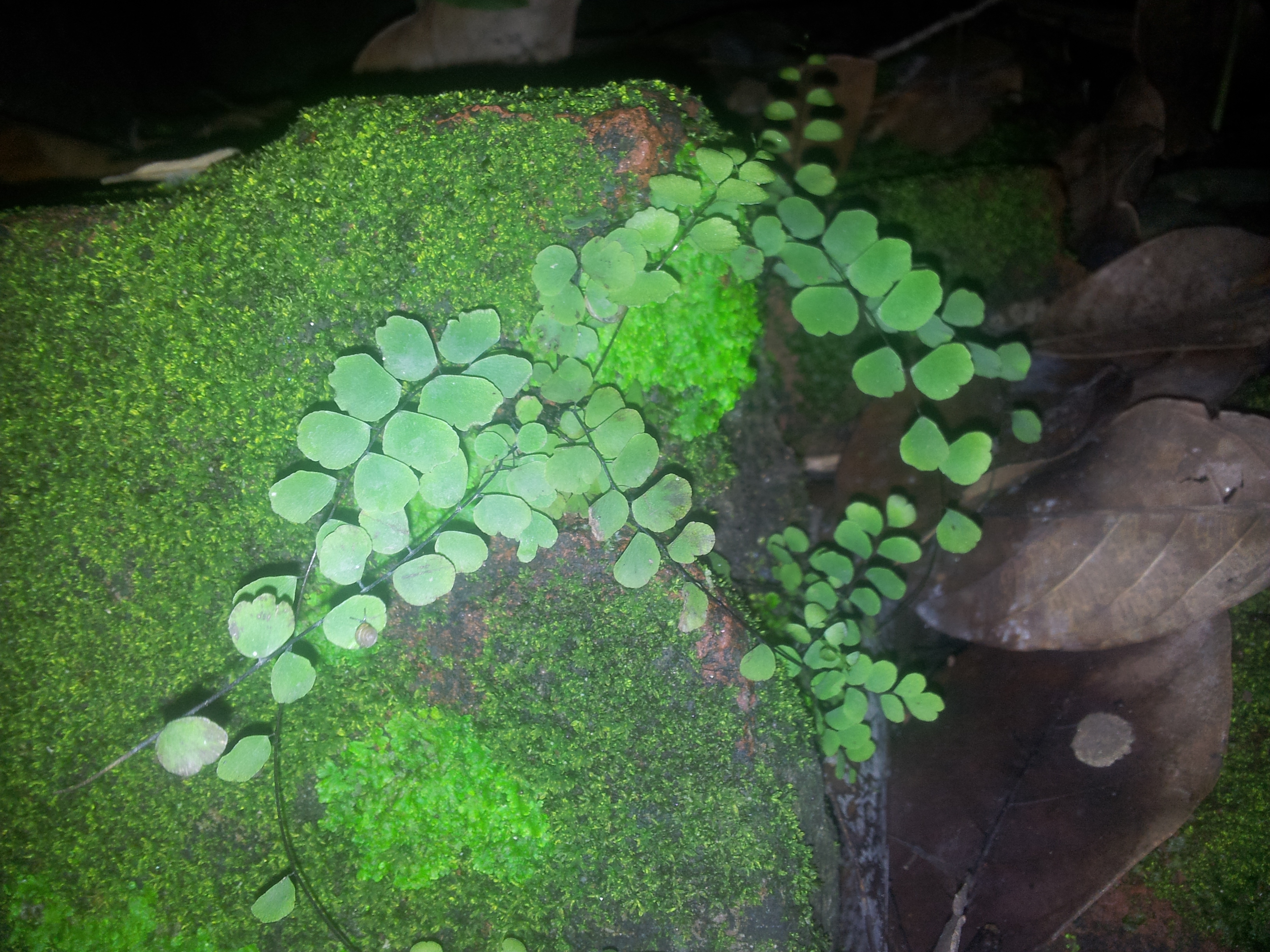
Adiantum philippense in Bangladesh

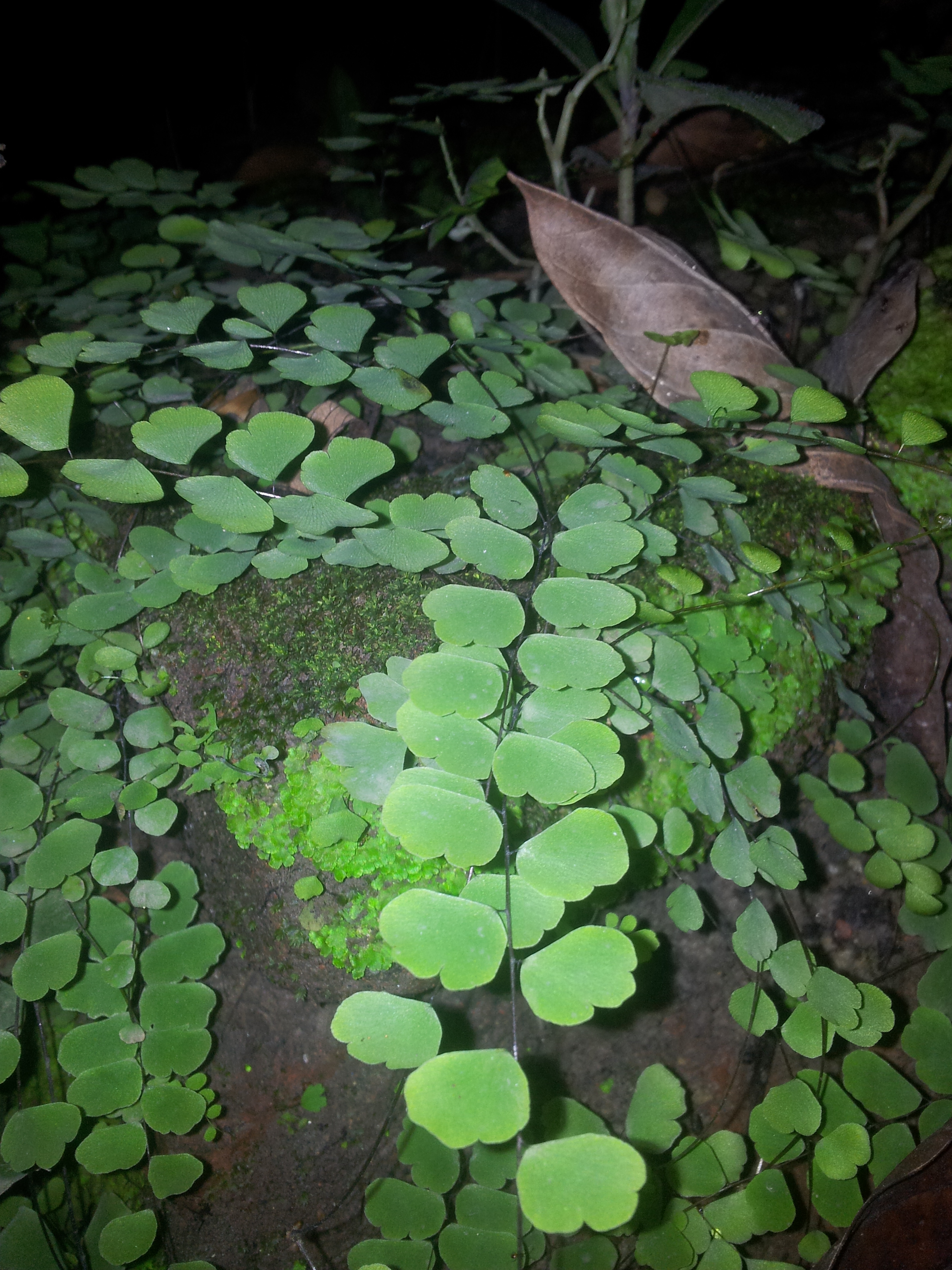
Maidenhair on shaded rocky bricks in Bangladesh

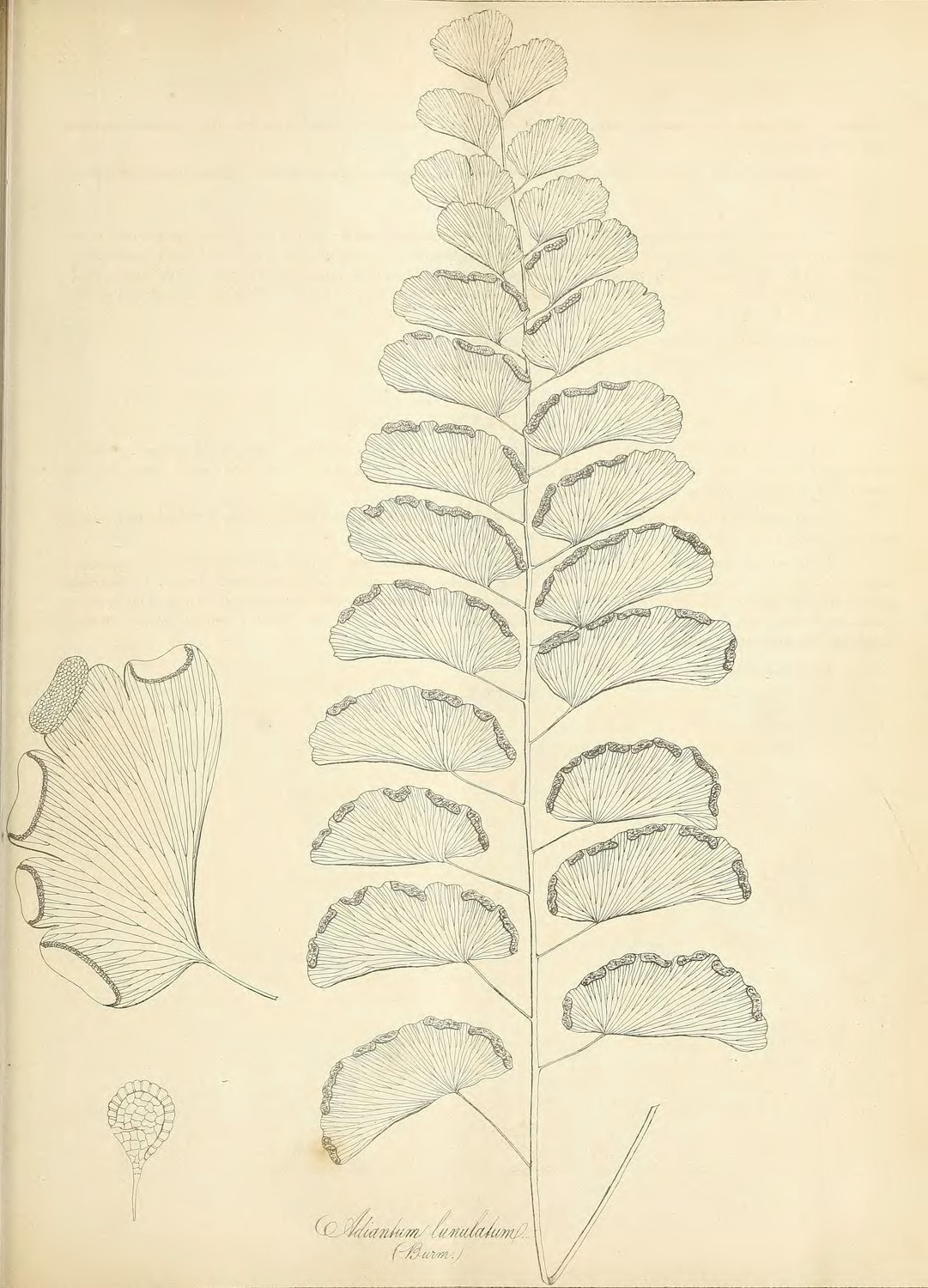
