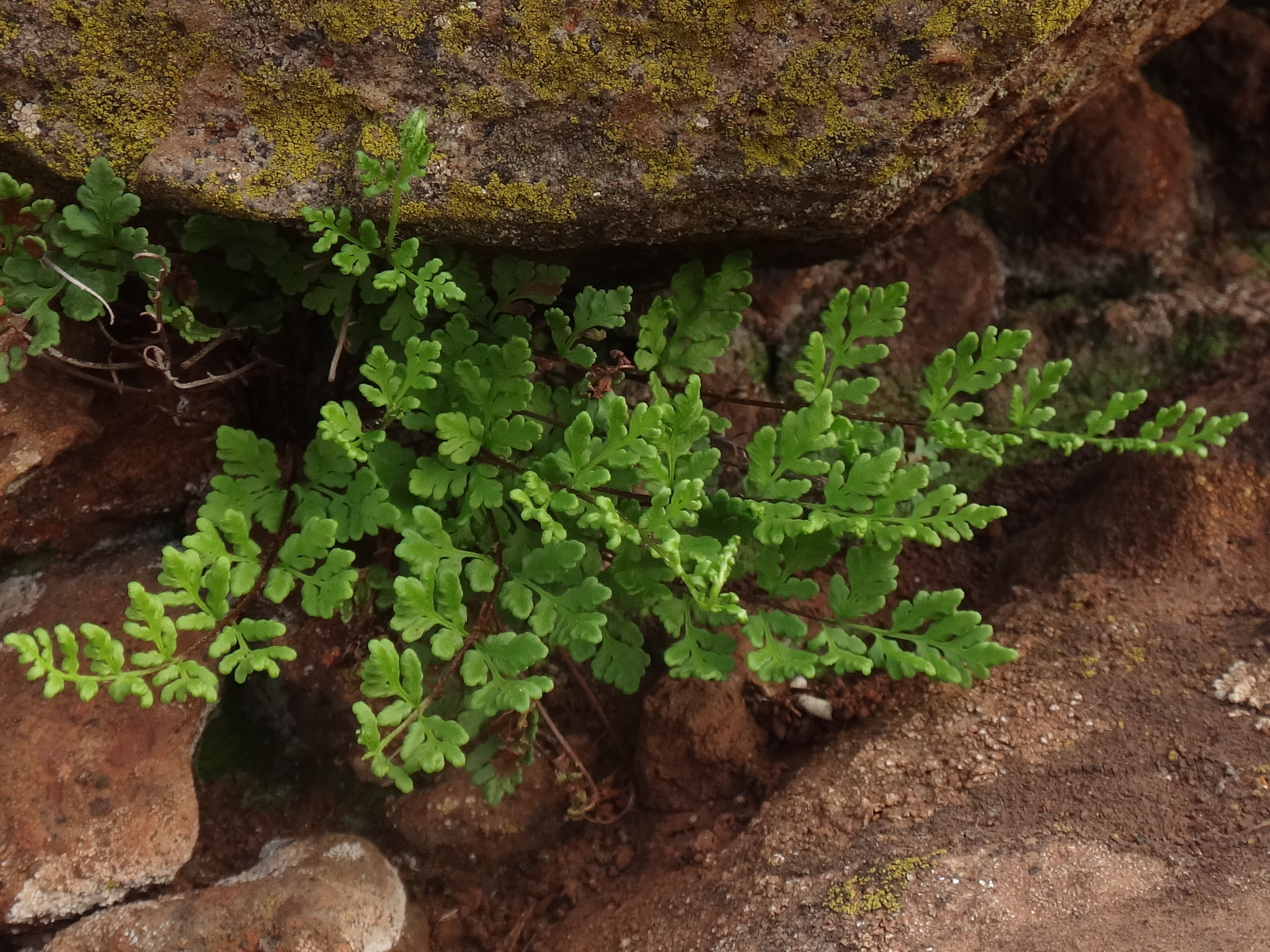
- Oeosporangium guanchicum

Scientific classification
- Kingdom: Plantae
- Clade: Tracheophytes
- Division: Polypodiophyta
- Class: Polypodiopsida
- Order: Polypodiales
- Family: Pteridaceae
- Subfamily: Cheilanthoideae
- Genus: Oeosporangium; Vis.

Species
- See text.

= Oeosporangium =

Genus of ferns

Oeosporangium is a genus of ferns in the subfamily Cheilanthoideae of the family Pteridaceae. The genus has not always been recognized. In the Pteridophyte Phylogeny Group classification of 2016 (PPG I) it was included in Allosorus (a genus since subsumed into Aleuritopteris). It was accepted by the Checklist of the Ferns and Lycophytes of the World as of January 2020. As circumscribed there, the genus is native to the Old World.

== Species ==
As of January 2020, the Checklist of Ferns and Lycophytes of the World recognized the following species:

- Oeosporangium belangeri (Bory) Fraser-Jenk.
- Oeosporangium chinense (Baker) Fraser-Jenk.
- Oeosporangium chusanum (Hook.) Fraser-Jenk.
- Oeosporangium contiguum (Baker) Fraser-Jenk.
- Oeosporangium coriaceum (Decne.) Fraser-Jenk. & Pariyar
- Oeosporangium delicatulum (Tagawa & K.Iwats.) Fraser-Jenk. & Pariyar
- Oeosporangium elegans (Poir.) Fraser-Jenk. & Pariyar
- Oeosporangium fragile (Hook.) Fraser-Jenk.
- Oeosporangium guanchicum (Bolle) Fraser-Jenk. & Pariyar
- Oeosporangium hancockii (Baker) Fraser-Jenk.
- Oeosporangium hispanicum (Mett.) Fraser-Jenk. & Pariyar
- Oeosporangium insigne (Ching) Fraser-Jenk.
- Oeosporangium kuhnii (Milde) Fraser-Jenk.
- Oeosporangium mairei (Brause) Fraser-Jenk.
- Oeosporangium nitidulum (Hook.) Fraser-Jenk.
- Oeosporangium pteridioides (Reichard) Fraser-Jenk. & Pariyar
- Oeosporangium patulum (Baker) Fraser-Jenk.
- Oeosporangium pauperculum (Christ) Fraser-Jenk. & Pariyar
- Oeosporangium persica (Bory) Vis.
- Oeosporangium pulchellum (Bory ex Willd.) Fraser-Jenk. & Pariyar
- Oeosporangium smithii (C.Chr.) Fraser-Jenk. & Pariyar
- Oeosporangium stramineum (Ching) Fraser-Jenk.
- Oeosporangium subvillosum (Hook.) Fraser-Jenk. & Pariyar
- Oeosporangium nudiusculum (R.Br.) comb. ined.
- Oeosporangium tenuifolium (Burm.f.) Fraser-Jenk. & Pariyar
- Oeosporangium thwaitesii (Mett. ex Kuhn) Fraser-Jenk.
- Oeosporangium tinaei (Tod.) Fraser-Jenk.
- Oeosporangium tirajanae (T.S.Velázquez) comb. ined.
- Oeosporangium trichophyllum (Baker) Fraser-Jenk.
- Oeosporangium velutinum (Tardieu & C.Chr.) Fraser-Jenk.
- Oeosporangium viride (Forsk.) Fraser-Jenk. & Pariyar
- Oeosporangium yunnanense (Ching) Fraser-Jenk. & Pariyar
