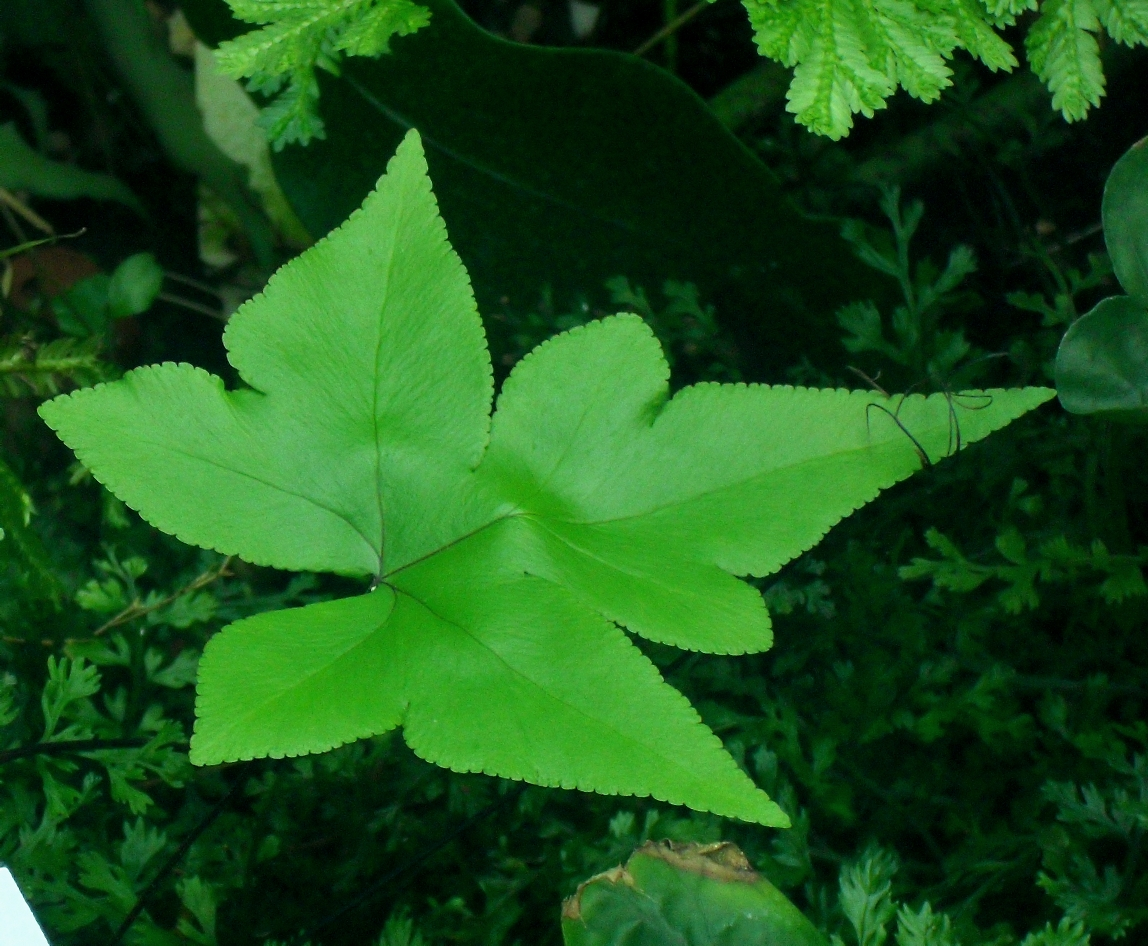
- Doryopteris pedata

Scientific classification
- Kingdom: Plantae
- Clade: Tracheophytes
- Division: Polypodiophyta
- Class: Polypodiopsida
- Order: Polypodiales
- Family: Pteridaceae
- Subfamily: Cheilanthoideae
- Genus: Doryopteris; J.Sm.

Species
- See text.

= Doryopteris =

Genus of ferns

Doryopteris is a genus of ferns in the subfamily Cheilanthoideae of the family Pteridaceae.

== Species ==
The circumscription of the genus was uncertain as of January 2020. The Checklist of Ferns and Lycophytes of the World lists species in three groups.

1. Doryopteris s.s. – species and hybrids assigned to the genus in molecular phylogenetic studies:

- Doryopteris adornata Yesilyurt
- Doryopteris angelica K.Wood & W.H.Wagner
- Doryopteris collina (Raddi) J.Sm.
- Doryopteris concolor (Langsd. & Fisch.) Kuhn
- Doryopteris decipiens (Hook.) J.Sm.
- Doryopteris decora Brack.
- Doryopteris × excisa Sehnem
- Doryopteris × hybrida Brade & Rosenst.
- Doryopteris × intermedia Sehnem
- Doryopteris kirkii (Hook.) Alston
- Doryopteris leitei Tryon
- Doryopteris lonchophora (Mett.) J.Sm.
- Doryopteris lorentzii (Hieron.) Diels
- Doryopteris majestosa Yesilyurt
- Doryopteris nobilis (Moore) J.Sm.
- Doryopteris palmata (Willd.) J.Sm.
- Doryopteris patula (Fée) Fée
- Doryopteris pedata (L.) Fée
- Doryopteris pentagona Pic. Serm.
- Doryopteris × procera Sehnem
- Doryopteris raddiana (Raddi) Fée
- Doryopteris rediviva Fée
- Doryopteris sagittifolia (Raddi) J.Sm.
- Doryopteris × scalaris Sehnem
- Doryopteris stierii Rosenst.
- Doryopteris × subdecipiens W.H.Wagner
- Doryopteris surinamensis Yesilyurt
- Doryopteris takeuchii (W.H.Wagner) W.H.Wagner
- Doryopteris triphylla (Lam.) Christ
- Doryopteris varians (Raddi) J.Sm.

2. Additional species belonging to Doryopteris s.l. – placed outside of Doryopteris s. str. by Yesilyurt et al. (2015), but with no alternative placement:

- Doryopteris angustata Sehnem
- Doryopteris apparicioi Brade
- Doryopteris campos-portoi Brade
- Doryopteris conformis Kramer & Tryon
- Doryopteris crispatula (Baker) C.Chr.
- Doryopteris cyclophylla A.R.Sm.
- Doryopteris davidsei A.R.Sm.
- Doryopteris jequitinhonhensis Salino
- Doryopteris trilobata J.Prado

3. Species placed outside of Doryopteris s.s. by Yesilyurt et al. (2015) that may be part of a redescribed Pellaeopsis or Hemionitis:

- Doryopteris cordifolia (Baker) Diels
- Doryopteris humbertii Tardieu
- Doryopteris kitchingii (Baker) Bonap.
- Doryopteris latiloba C.Chr.
- Doryopteris madagascariensis Tardieu
- Doryopteris pedatoides (Desv.) Kuhn
- Doryopteris pilosa (Poir.) Kuhn
