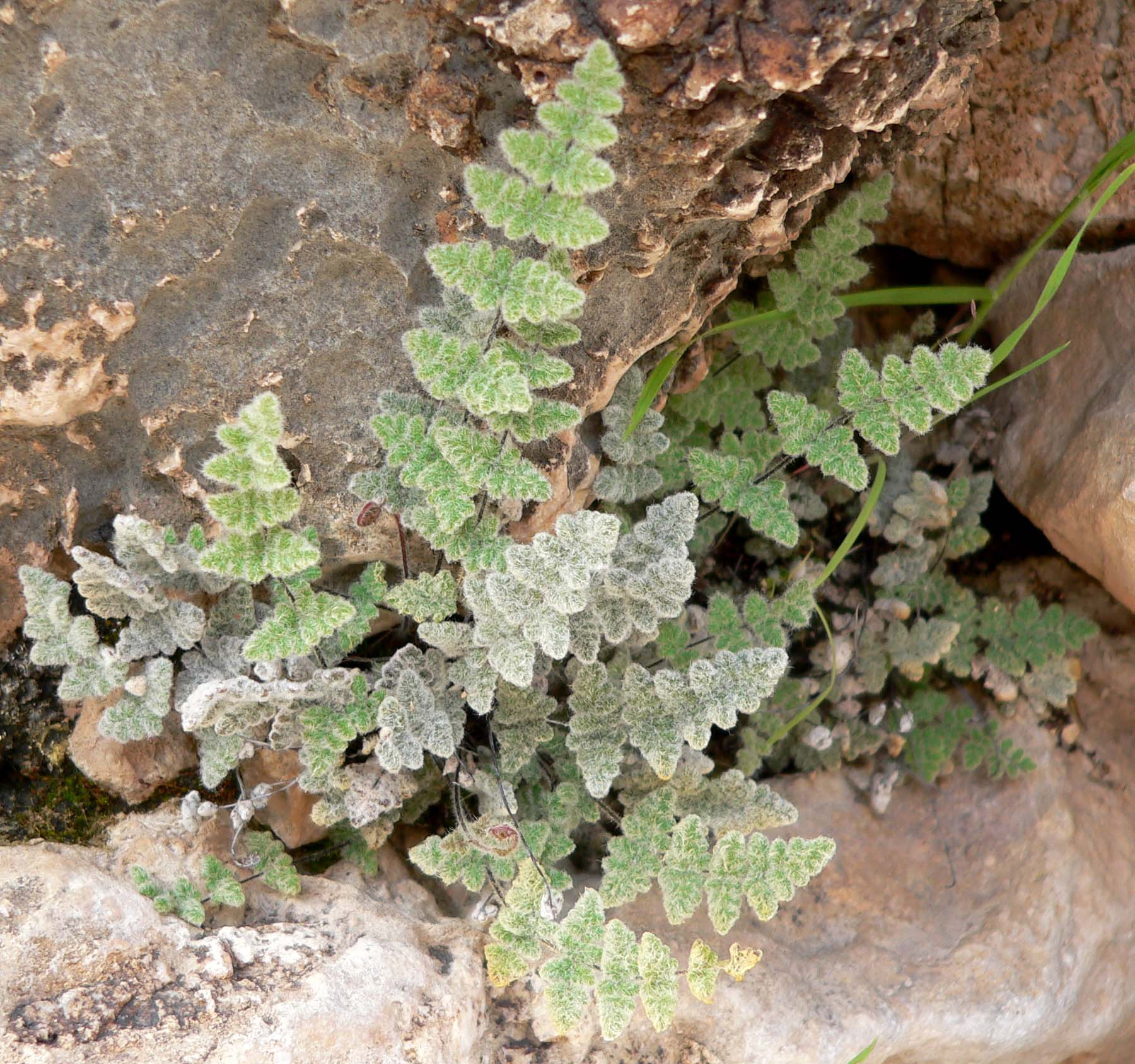
- Myriopteris parryi

Scientific classification
- Kingdom: Plantae
- Clade: Tracheophytes
- Division: Polypodiophyta
- Class: Polypodiopsida
- Order: Polypodiales
- Family: Pteridaceae
- Subfamily: Cheilanthoideae; W.C.Shieh

Genera
- See text.

Synonyms
- Cheilanthaceae B.K.Nayar

= Cheilanthoideae =

Subfamily of ferns

Cheilanthoideae is one of the five subfamilies of the fern family Pteridaceae. The subfamily is understood to be monophyletic, but some of the genera as currently defined are not. Most species are xeric-adapted, and the subfamily is most diverse in dry areas.

== Phylogenic relationships ==
The following phylogram shows a likely relationship between Cheilanthoideae and the other Pteridaceae subfamilies.

- Pteridaceae
  - Cryptogrammoideae
  - - - Parkerioideae (syn. Ceratopteridoideae)
      - Pteridoideae
    - - Vittarioideae
      - Cheilanthoideae

Although subfamily Cheilanthoideae itself is thought to be monophyletic, many of the genera into which it has been divided (including Cheilanthes, Doryopteris, Notholaena, and Pellaea) have been shown to be polyphyletic.

== Genera ==
The following genera of Cheilanthoideae are recognized by the Checklist of Ferns and Lycophytes of the World, which incorporates the arrangements of the hemionitid ferns published in Schuettpelz et al. 2025. That arrangement separated a number of genera from Cheilanthes s.l. and Pellaea s.l., and subsumed Mildella and Oeosporangium, formerly a Eurasian segregate of Cheilanthes, under Aleuritopteris.

- Adiantopsis Fée
- Aleuritopteris Fée
- Anthonya Windham & Pryer
- Argyrochosma (J.Sm.) Windham
- Aspidotis (Nutt. ex Hooker) Copel.
- Astrolepis D.M.Benham & Windham
- Baja Windham & L.O.George
- Brasiliopteris J.Prado, Schuettp. & Yatsk.
- Bommeria E.Fourn.
- Calciphilopteris Yesilyurt & H.Schneid.
- Carlottahallia Windham
- Cheilanthes Sw. (nom. cons.)
- Cheiloplecton Fée
- Choristosoria Kuhn
- Christenhuszia Windham & Pryer
- Doryopteris J.Sm. (nom. cons.)
- Estrella Windham
- Gaga Pryer, F.W. Li & Windham
- Hemionitis L.
- Lytoneuron (Klotzsch) Yesilyurt
- Mineirella Ponce & Scataglini
- Myriopteris Fée
- Namaquapteris Windham & Pryer
- Notholaena R.Br.
- Ormopteris J.Sm.
- Paragymnopteris K.H.Shing
- Parahemionitis Panigrahi
- Pellaea Link (nom. cons.)
- Pellaeopsis J.Sm.
- Pentagramma Yatsk., Windham & E.Wollenw.
- Quechuapteris Windham
- Trachypteris André ex Christ.
- Ynesmexia Fauskee & Windham

Some other genera that have been included in the subfamily (or split off from genera included in the subfamily) are:

- Allosorus Bernh. (nom. rej.) – not included by Christenhusz et al. (2011); accepted in PPG I. The type was subsequently discovered to belong to Cryptogramma and the name has been formally suppressed.
- Mickelopteris Fraser-Jenk. – rendered unnecessary by conservation of Asplenium arifolium as a new type, so now a synonym of Parahemionitis.
- Mildella Trev. – subsumed in Aleuritopteris by Schuettpelz et al.
- Oeosporangium Vis. – considered a synonym of Allosorus in PPG I, subsequently accepted for a group of largely European species and then subsumed in Aleuritopteris by Schuettpelz et al.
- Pteridella Mett. ex Kuhn – accepted by Christenhusz & Chase (2014); considered a synonym of Pellaeopsis by World Ferns.
- Sericopteris Jing Zhao, X.M.Zhou & Z.R.He – published in 2025 to resolve the polyphyly of Paragymnopteris

Other sources take a radically different approach. As of October 2025, Plants of the World Online places all of the possible genera of the Cheilanthoideae in the single genus Hemionitis.

While much work remains to be done in delineating monophyletic genera in the cheilanthoids (Cheilanthes, Doryopteris and Pellaea remaining notably polyphyletic), several major clades have been consistently recovered in phylogenetic analyses and given informal names, as shown here:

- cheilanthoids
  - "ludens clade"
    Calciphilopteris
  - - bommeriids
      Baja, Bommeria
    - - - "skinneri clade"
          Ynesmexia
        - - myriopterids
            Myriopteris
          - pellaeids
            Argyrochosma, Astrolepis, Paragymnopteris, and Pellaea
      - - notholaenids
          Cheilanthes leucopoda, Cheiloplecton, Notholaena
        - hemionitids
          Adiantopsis, Aleuritopteris, Anthonya, Aspidotis, Brasiliopteris, Carlottahallia, Cheilanthes, Choristosoria, Christenhuszia, Doryopteris, Estrella, Gaga, Hemionitis, Lytoneuron, Mineirella, Namaquapteris, Ormopteris, Paragymnopteris, Parahemionitis, Pellaeopsis, Pentagramma, Quechuapteris, Trachypteris
