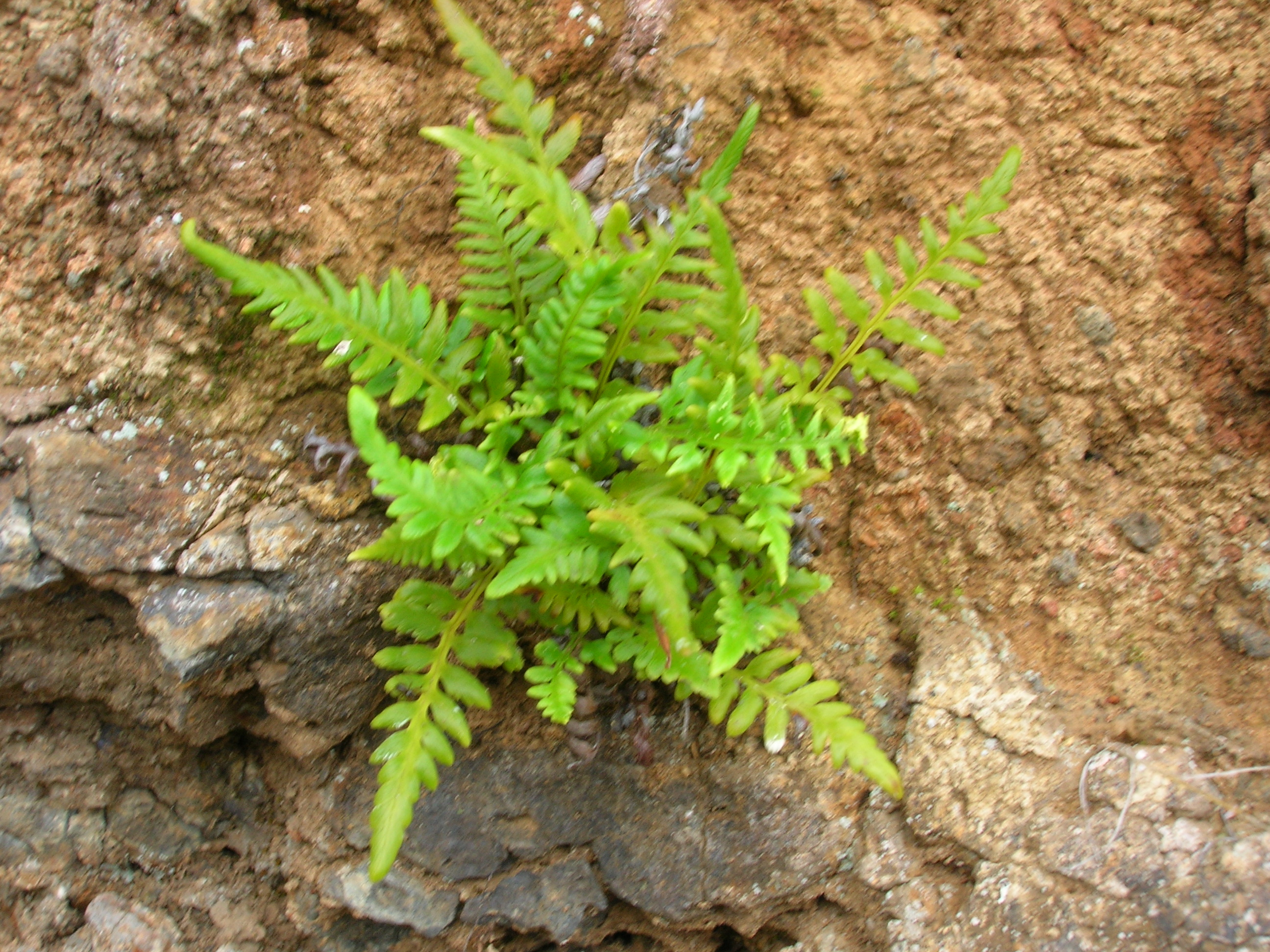
- Pityrogramma austroamericana

Scientific classification
- Kingdom: Plantae
- Clade: Tracheophytes
- Division: Polypodiophyta
- Class: Polypodiopsida
- Order: Polypodiales
- Suborder: Pteridineae; J.Prado & Schuettp.
- Family: Pteridaceae; E.D.M.Kirchn.

Subfamilies
- Cryptogrammoideae; Parkerioideae; Pteridoideae; Cheilanthoideae; Vittarioideae

Synonyms
- Acrostichaceae A.B.Frank; Actiniopteridaceae Pic. Serm.; Adiantaceae Newman nom. cons.; Anopteraceae Doweld; Antrophyaceae Ching; Ceratopteridaceae Underw.; Cheilanthaceae M.P.Nayar; Cryptogrammaceae Pic.Serm.; Hemionitidaceae Pic.Serm.; Negripteridaceae Pic.Serm.; Parkeriaceae Hook.; Platyzomataceae Nakai; Sinopteridaceae Koidz.; Taenitidaceae Pic.Serm.; Vittariaceae Ching

= Pteridaceae =

Pteridaceae Temporal range: Cenomanian–Recent

Family of ferns

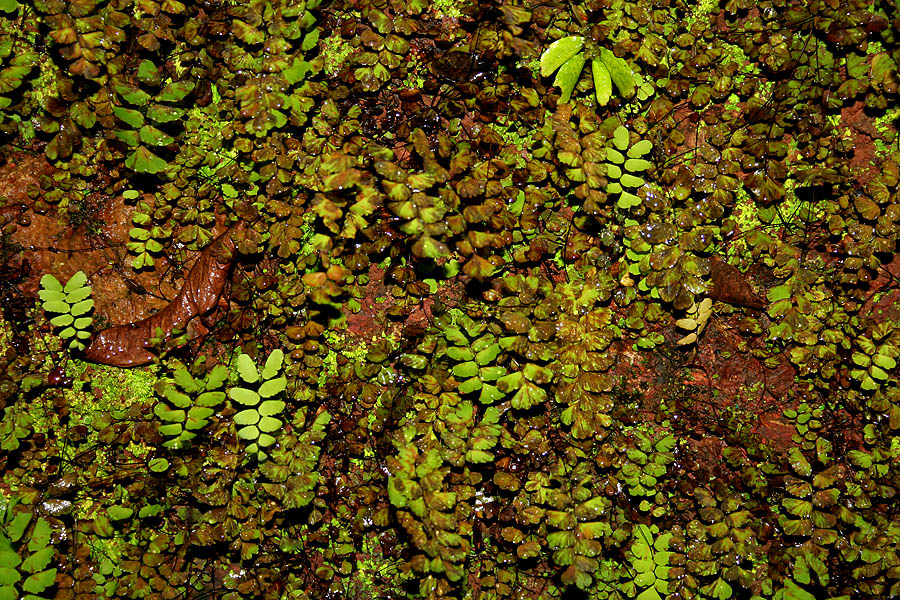
Adiantum lunulatum

Pteridaceae is a family of ferns in the order Polypodiales, including some 1150 known species in ca 45 genera (depending on taxonomic opinions), divided over five subfamilies. The family includes four groups of genera that are sometimes recognized as separate families: the adiantoid, cheilanthoid, pteridoid, and hemionitidoid ferns. Relationships among these groups remain unclear, and although some recent genetic analyses of the Pteridales suggest that neither the family Pteridaceae nor the major groups within it are all monophyletic, as yet these analyses are insufficiently comprehensive and robust to provide good support for a revision of the order at the family level.

== Description ==
Members of Pteridaceae have creeping or erect rhizomes. The leaves are almost always compound and have linear sori that are typically on the margins of the leaves and lack a true indusium, typically being protected by a false indusium formed from the reflexed margin of the leaf.

== Taxonomy ==
=== Traditional groups ===
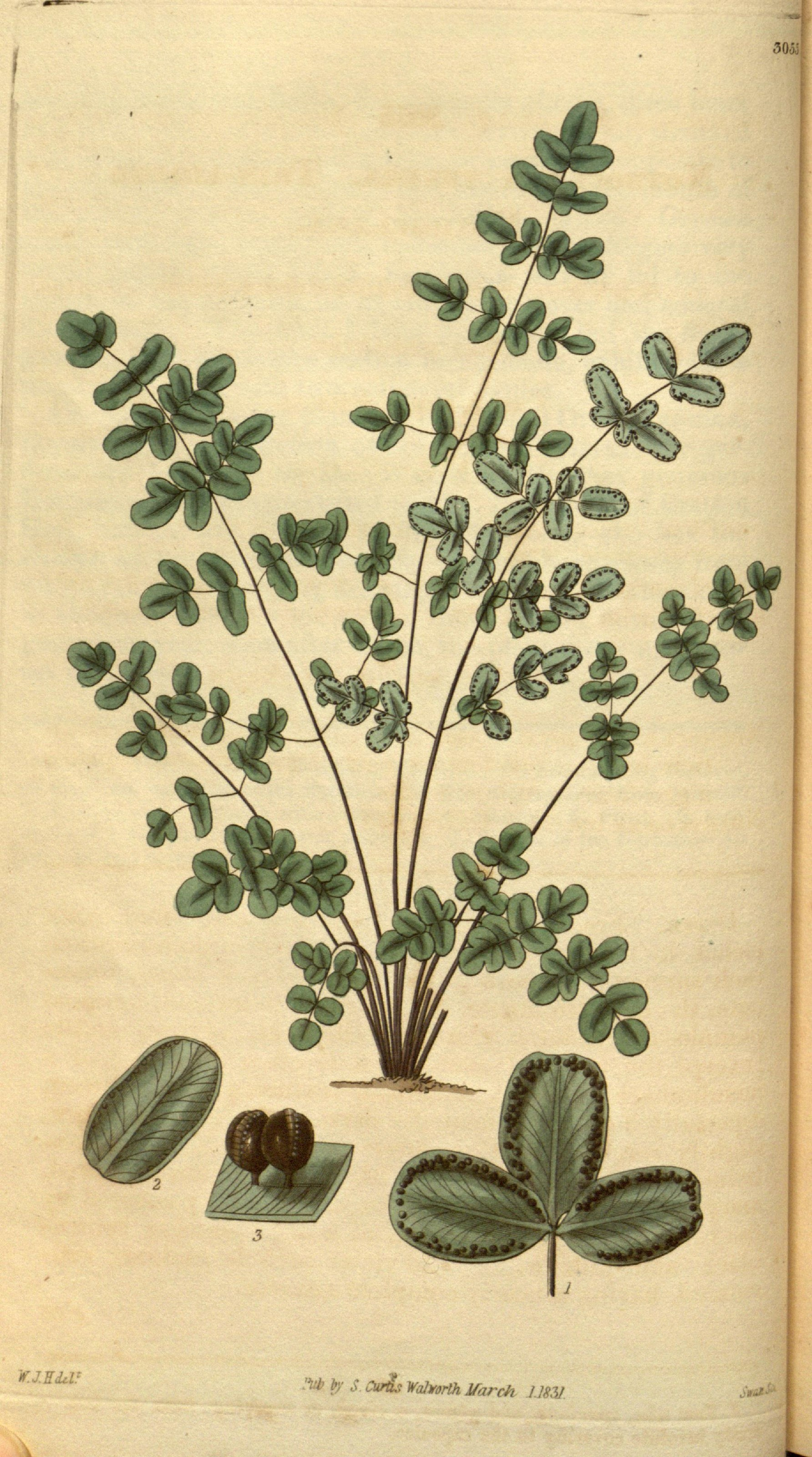
Curtis's botanical magazine, Argyrochosma nivea var. tenera

As traditionally defined, the groups within Pteridaceae are as follows:

- Adiantoid ferns (tribe Adianteae Gaudich. 1829); epipetric, terrestrial or epiphytic in moist habitats, rachis often dichotomously branching; sori relatively small and discrete with sporangia born on the false indusium rather than the leaf blade proper; only one genus:
  - Adiantum L. – maidenhair ferns
- Cheilanthoid ferns; primarily epipetric in semiarid habitats; leaves mostly with well-developed scales or trichomes, often bipinnate or otherwise highly compound; sporangia mostly born in marginal sori with false indusia that are ± continuous around the leaf margins; several genera, including:
  - Argyrochosma (J.Sm.) Windham – false cloak ferns
  - Aspidotis (Nutt. ex Hook.) Copel. – lace ferns
  - Astrolepis D.M.Benham & Windham – cloak ferns
  - Cheilanthes Sw. – lip ferns
  - Myriopteris Fée – lace lip ferns
  - Notholaena R.Br. – cloak ferns
  - Pellaea Link – cliff brakes
- Pteridoid ferns (tribe Pterideae J. Sm 1841); terrestrial and epipetric in moist habitats; leaves mostly without prominent scales or trichomes, most often pinnate but sometimes more compound; sporangia born in marginal sori with false indusia that are ± continuous around the leaf margins; several genera, including:
  - Pteris L. – brakes
  - Onychium Kaulf.
- Parkerioid ferns (tribe Parkerieae Brongn. 1843); aquatic in swamps and/or mangroves, including:
  - Acrostichum L. – leather ferns
  - Ceratopteris Brongn.
- Hemionitidoid ferns; terrestrial, epipetric or epiphytic in moist or semiarid habitats; leaves simple, pinnate, or more compound; sporangia born in linear non-marginal, exindusiate sori or sometimes in marginal sori; several genera, including:
  - Anogramma Link
  - Cryptogramma R.Br. – rock brakes
  - Eriosorus Fée
  - Hemionitis L.
  - Jamesonia Hook. & Grev.
  - Pityrogramma Link – gold ferns
- Vittarioid ferns (tribe Vittarieae C. Presl 1836); primarily epiphytic in tropical regions and all have simple leaves with sori that follow the veins and lack true indusia:
  - Anetium Splitg. 1840
  - Antrophyum Kaulf. 1875
  - Hecistopteris (L.) Sm. 1842
  - Monogramma Comm. ex Schkuhr 1809
  - Vittaria (L.) Sm. 1793 – Shoestring fern

=== Subfamilies ===
Based on phylogenetic research, Christenhusz et al. (2011) divided the Pteridaceae genera into five subfamilies. These roughly correspond with the groups listed above, with the main difference being that adiantoid and vittarioid ferns are combined under the Vittarioideae subfamily name. The approach was followed by the Pteridophyte Phylogeny Group classification of 2016 (PPG I).

- Cryptogrammoideae S.Linds.
(=) Cryptogrammaceae Pic. Serm.

Genera: Coniogramme, Cryptogramma, Llavea

- Parkerioideae (J.Sm.) R.M.Tryon
(=) Ceratopteridoideae
(=) Parkeriaceae Hook.
(=) Ceratopteridaceae Underw.

Genera: Acrostichum, Ceratopteris

- Pteridoideae C.Chr. ex Crabbe, Jermy & Mickel

Genera: Actiniopteris, Anogramma, Austrogramme, Cerosora, Cosentinia, Gastoniella, Jamesonia (incl. Eriosorus and Nephopteris), Onychium, Pityrogramma, Pteris (incl. Neurocallis & Platyzoma), Pterozonium, Syngramma, Taenitis, Tryonia

- Cheilanthoideae W.C.Shieh
(=) Cheilanthaceae B.K. Nayar

Genera: Adiantopsis, Aleuritopteris, Allosorus, Argyrochosma, Aspidotis, Astrolepis, Bommeria, Calciphilopteris, Cheilanthes, Cheiloplecton, Doryopteris, Gaga, Hemionitis, Lytoneuron, Mildella, Myriopteris, Notholaena, Ormopteris, Paragymnopteris, Parahemionitis, Pellaea, Pentagramma, Trachypteris

- Vittarioideae (C.Presl) Crabbe, Jermy & Mickel
(=) Adiantoideae (C.Presl) R.M.Tryon
(=) Adiantaceae Newman

Genera: Adiantum, Ananthacorus, Antrophyopsis, Antrophyum, Haplopteris, Hecistopteris, Polytaenium, Radiovittaria, Rheopteris, Scoliosorus, Vaginularia, Vittaria

=== Phylogenic relationships ===
Smith et al. (2006) carried out the first higher-level pteridophyte classification published in the molecular phylogenetic era. Smith referred to the ferns as monilophytes, dividing them into four groups. The vast majority of ferns were placed in the Polypodiopsida.

In 2016, the Pteridophyte Phylogeny Group divided order Polypodiales into six suborders. Pteridaceae is the sole family in suborder Pteridiineae, with 52 genera. The suborder has the same circumscription as Smith et al. used for the family. The phylogenetic relationship between these six suborders is shown in this cladogram:

- Polypodiales
  - - Saccolomatineae
    - Lindsaeineae
  - - Pteridineae
    - - Dennstaedtiineae
      - - Aspleniineae
        - Polypodiineae

The oldest fossil of the family is Heinrichsia from the early Late Cretaceous (Cenomanian) aged Burmese amber of Myanmar, which cannot be assigned to modern grouping of the family. Molecular clock evidence suggests a diversification of the family during the Late Cretaceous.

Phylogeny of Pteridaceae.

Schuettpelz & Pryer 2008

- - Cryptogrammoideae
    - Llavea
    - - Coniogramme
      - Cryptogramma
  - - - Ceratopteridoideae
        - Acrostichum
        - Ceratopteris
      - Pteridoideae
    - - Cheilanthoideae
      - Vittarioideae

Nitta et al. 2022 and Fern Tree of life

- - - Ceratopteridoideae
      - Acrostichum
      - Ceratopteris
    - Pteridoideae
      - - Onychieae
          - Actiniopteris
          - Onychium
        - Taenitideae
          - - - Cosentinia
              - Anogramma
            - - Gastoniella
              - - Cerosora
                - Pityrogramma
          - - - Pterozonium
              - - Tryonia
                - - Taenitis
                  - - Syngramma vittiformis
                    - - Austrogramme
                      - Syngramma
            - Jamesonia
      - - Pterideae
          Pteris
  - - - Cryptogrammoideae
        - Llavea
        - - Coniogramme
          - Cryptogramma
    - - Vittarioideae
        - Vittarieae
          - - - Rheopteris
              - Vaginularia
          - - - - Hecistopteris
                - Radiovittaria
              - Haplopteris
            - - - Vittaria
                - - - Ananthacorus
                    - Scoliosorus
                  - Polytaenium
              - - Antrophyopsis
                - Antrophyum
        - Adianteae
          Adiantum
      - Cheilanthoideae
        - - Calciphilopterideae
            Calciphilopteris
        - - - Bommeria elegans
            - - Baja
              - Bommeria
          - - - Pellaeae
                - Ynesmexia
                - - Myriopteris
                  - - Argyrochosma
                    - - - Pellaea breweri
                        - Paragymnopteris
                      - - - Pellaea species-group 2
                          - Astrolepis
                        - Pellaea
            - - Cheilanthes bolborrhiza
              - - Notholaeneae
                  - Cheilanthes leucopoda
                  - - Notholaena standleyi
                    - - Notholaena species-group 2
                      - - Cheiloplecton
                        - Notholaena
                - Cheilantheae
                  - Pentagramma
                  - - - - Aspidotis
                        - Gaga
                      - - - Negripteris
                          - - Aleuritopteris tamburii
                            - - Mildella
                              - Oeosporangium species-group 2
                        - - - Sinopteris
                            - Oeosporangium
                          - Aleuritopteris
                    - - Cheilanthinae
                        Cheilanthes
                      - Gymnopteridinae
                        - - - - Mickelopteris
                              - Parahemionitis
                            - Hemionitis
                          - Pellaeopsis
                        - - - Trachypteris
                            - Adiantopsis
                          - - - Brasiliopteris
                              - - - Choristosoria namaquensis
                                  - Mineirella
                                - Choristosoria
                            - - - Lytoneuron
                                - Ormopteris
                              - Doryopteris

== Distribution and habitat ==
Mostly terrestrial or epipetric (growing on rock).

== Bibliography ==
- Chase, Mark W.; Reveal, James L. (2009). "A phylogenetic classification of the land plants to accompany APG III". Botanical Journal of the Linnean Society. 161 (2): 122–127. doi:10.1111/j.1095-8339.2009.01002.x.
- Christenhusz, M. J. M.; Zhang, X. C.; Schneider, H. (18 February 2011). "A linear sequence of extant families and genera of lycophytes and ferns". Phytotaxa. 19 (1): 7. Bibcode:2011Phytx..19....7C. doi:10.11646/phytotaxa.19.1.2. hdl:10138/28042.
- Christenhusz, Maarten J.M.; Chase, Mark W. (2014). "Trends and concepts in fern classification". Annals of Botany. 113 (4): 571–594. doi:10.1093/aob/mct299. PMC 3936591. PMID 24532607.
- Christenhusz, Maarten JM & Byng, J. W. (2016). "The number of known plants species in the world and its annual increase". Phytotaxa. 261 (3): 201–217. Bibcode:2016Phytx.261..201C. doi:10.11646/phytotaxa.261.3.1.
- Lehtonen, Samuli (2011). "Towards Resolving the Complete Fern Tree of Life". PLoS ONE. 6 (10) e24851. Bibcode:2011PLoSO...624851L. doi:10.1371/journal.pone.0024851. PMC 3192703. PMID 22022365.
- Pryer, Kathleen M.; Schneider, Harald; Smith, Alan R.; Cranfill, Raymond; Wolf, Paul G.; Hunt, Jeffrey S.; Sipes, Sedonia D. (2001). "Horsetails and ferns are a monophyletic group and the closest living relatives to seed plants". Nature. 409 (6820): 618–622. doi:10.1038/35054555. PMID 11214320. S2CID 4367248.
- Pteridophyte Phylogeny Group (November 2016). "A community-derived classification for extant lycophytes and ferns". Journal of Systematics and Evolution. 54 (6): 563–603. Bibcode:2016JSyEv..54..563.. doi:10.1111/jse.12229. S2CID 39980610.
- Ranker, Tom A.; Haufler, Christopher H., eds. (2008). Biology and Evolution of Ferns and Lycophytes. Cambridge University Press. ISBN 978-0-521-87411-3.
- Schneider, Harald; Schuettpelz, Eric; Pryer, Kathleen M.; Cranfill, Raymond; Magallón, Susana; Lupia, Richard (1 April 2004). "Ferns diversified in the shadow of angiosperms". Nature. 428 (6982): 553–557. Bibcode:2004Natur.428..553S. doi:10.1038/nature02361. PMID 15058303.
- Schneider, Harald; Smith, Alan R.; Pryer, Kathleen M. (1 July 2009). "Is Morphology Really at Odds with Molecules in Estimating Fern Phylogeny?". Systematic Botany. 34 (3): 455–475. Bibcode:2009SysBo..34..455S. doi:10.1600/036364409789271209. S2CID 85855934.
- Smith, Alan R.; Kathleen M. Pryer; Eric Schuettpelz; Petra Korall; Harald Schneider; Paul G. Wolf (2006). "A classification for extant ferns" (PDF). Taxon. 55 (3): 705–731. Bibcode:2006Taxon..55..705S. doi:10.2307/25065646. JSTOR 25065646.
- Smith, Alan R.; Pryer, Kathleen M.; Schuettpelz, Eric; Korall, Petra; Schneider, Harald; Wolf, Paul G. (9 December 2024). Fern classification (PDF). pp. 417–467., in Ranker & Haufler (2008)
- Eric Schuettpelz. The evolution and diversification of epiphytic ferns. PhD Thesis Duke University 2007
- Michael Hassler and Brian Swale. Checklist of Ferns and Fern Allies 2001
- Australian National Botanic Gardens. A classification of the ferns and their allies
