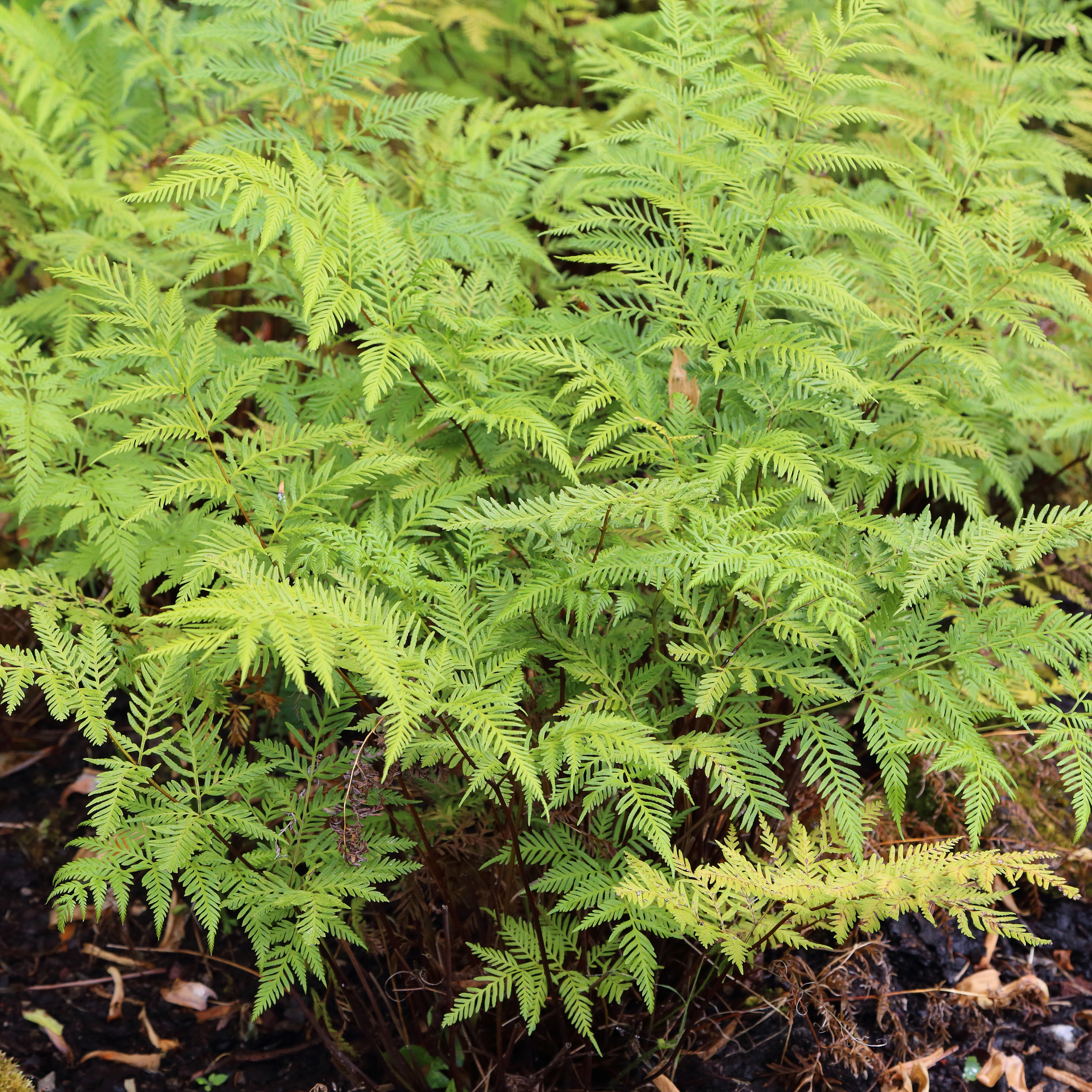

Scientific classification
- Kingdom: Plantae
- Clade: Tracheophytes
- Division: Polypodiophyta
- Class: Polypodiopsida
- Order: Polypodiales
- Family: Pteridaceae
- Genus: Pteris
- Species: P. tremula

Binomial name
- Pteris tremula R.Br.

= Pteris tremula =

Species of fern

Pteris tremula, commonly known as Australian brake, tender brake, tender brakefern, shaking brake is a fern species of the family Pteridaceae native to sheltered areas and forests in eastern Australia and New Zealand. It has pale green, lacy fronds of up to 2 meters (6.6 feet) in length. It is fast-growing and easy to grow in cultivation, but can become weedy.

== Description ==
Pteris tremula is a terrestrial fern, with its fronds arising from the ground up to 1.3 m (4.3 ft) with an erect, tufted rhizome that is covered with narrow brown scales, rarely up to 2 m (6.6 ft) tall. The stipe is brown. The light green lacy compound fronds may reach 2 m (6.6 ft) in length and are 3-pinnate or more. The brownish sori line the undersides of the frond margins.

Unlike Pteris vittata and other Pteris species, it is not able to hyperaccumulate arsenic and is damaged by levels as low as 25 mg/kg in the soil. The plant contains two cytotoxic indanonic sesquiterpenes.

== Distribution and habitat ==
The range within Australia is Central Australia (Northern Territory), eastern South Australia, Queensland, eastern New South Wales, Victoria and Tasmania. It is also found on Lord Howe and Norfolk Island, New Zealand, and the Kermadec Islands and Fiji. It is found in sheltered habitats in wet sclerophyll and rainforest. It has become naturalized in Argentina near the Río de la Plata.

== Cultivation ==
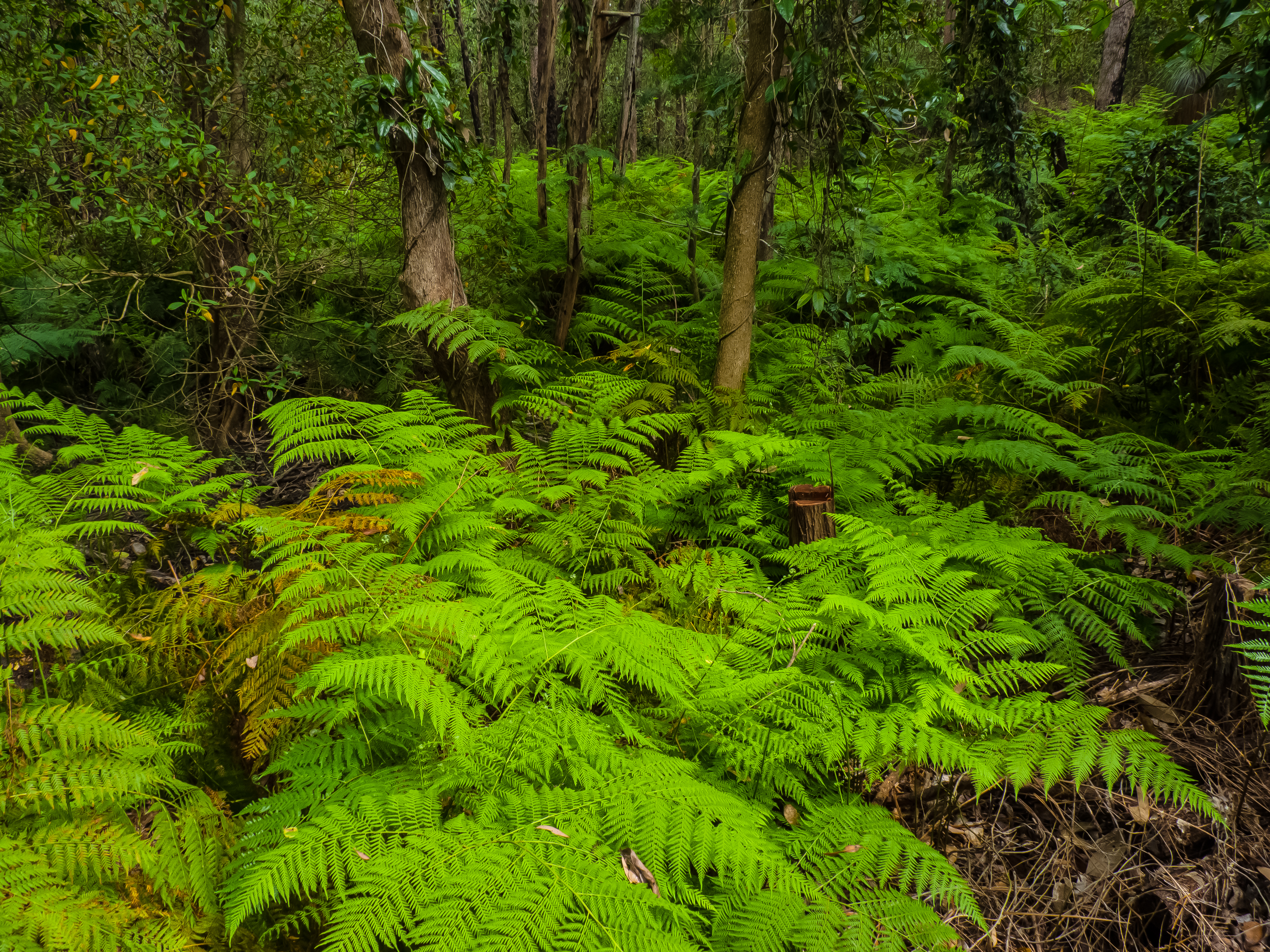
In native habitat

Pteris tremula is a fairly easy plant to grow in the home garden, where it prefers a shady spot. It prefers fair drainage with some moisture retention in the soil and filtered morning light. It is nevertheless fast growing and has been known to naturalise. In the 1950s it was reported to be the most commonly cultivated Pteris species in the United States of America.

== Taxonomy ==
The botanist Robert Brown published this plant in the year 1810, in his Prodromus Florae Novae Hollandiae, and still bears its original name. The specific epithet tremula is the Latin "tremulous" or "shaking". It is a member of the large genus Pteris, containing around 300 species, 7 of which can be found in Australia. Tender brake is a common name for the fern. Species in Pteris are currently placed in subfamily Pteridoideae of family Pteridaceae/

=== Varieties ===
- Pteris tremula var. caudata
- Pteris tremula var. minor
- Pteris tremula var. pectinata
- Pteris tremula var. tremula
