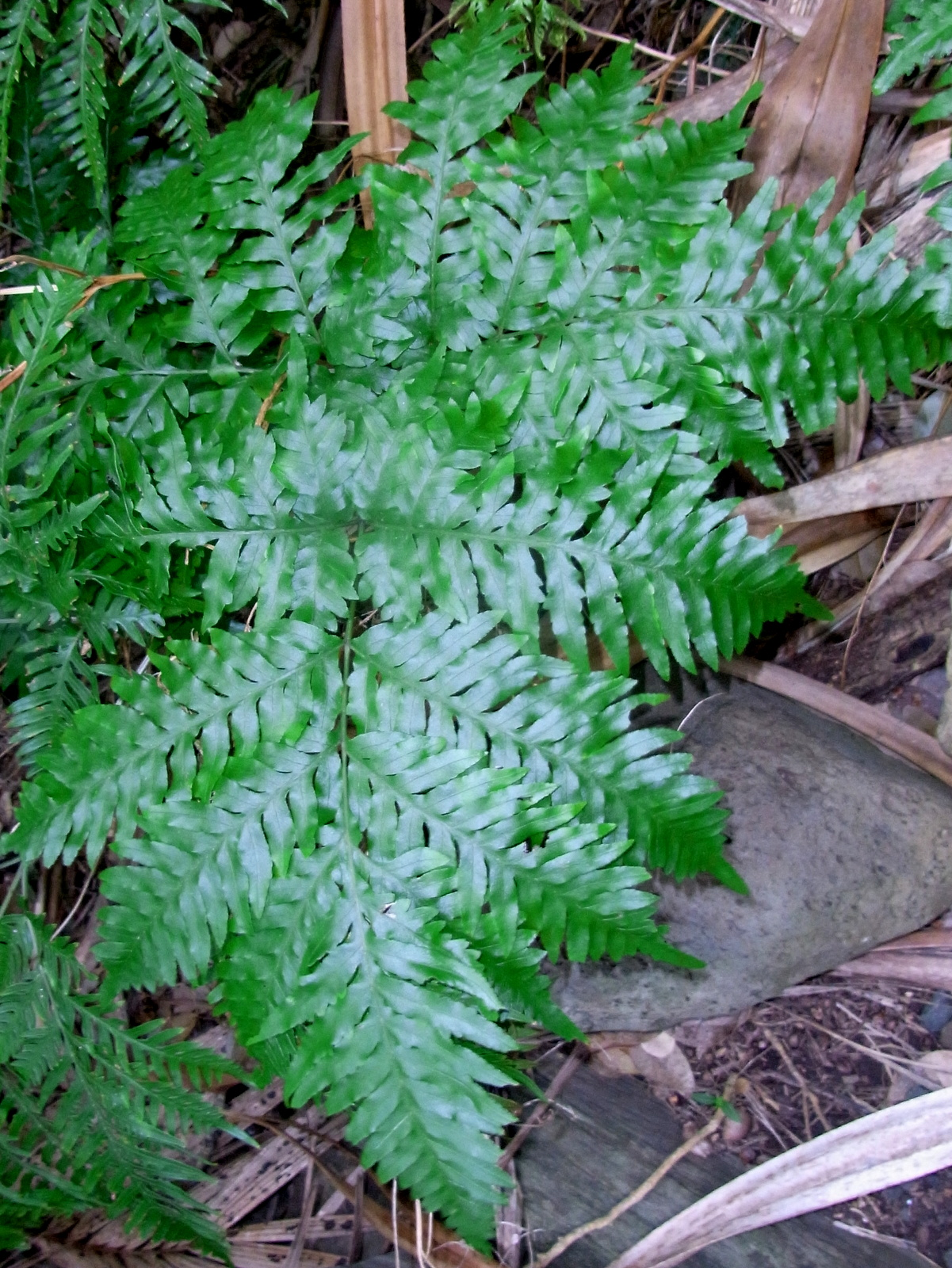

Scientific classification
- Kingdom: Plantae
- Clade: Tracheophytes
- Division: Polypodiophyta
- Class: Polypodiopsida
- Order: Polypodiales
- Family: Pteridaceae
- Genus: Pteris
- Species: P. microptera

Binomial name
- Pteris microptera Mett. ex Kuhn (1869)

= Pteris microptera =

Species of fern

Pteris microptera is a fern in the family Pteridaceae.

== Description ==
The fern has a stout and erect rhizome covered with triangular brown scales. The fronds are tufted and glossy, growing to 0.5–2 m in height. The species is part of the complex and widespread Pteris comans group.

== Distribution and habitat ==
The fern is endemic to Australia's subtropical Lord Howe Island in the Tasman Sea; it is common and widespread throughout the Island at lower elevations.
