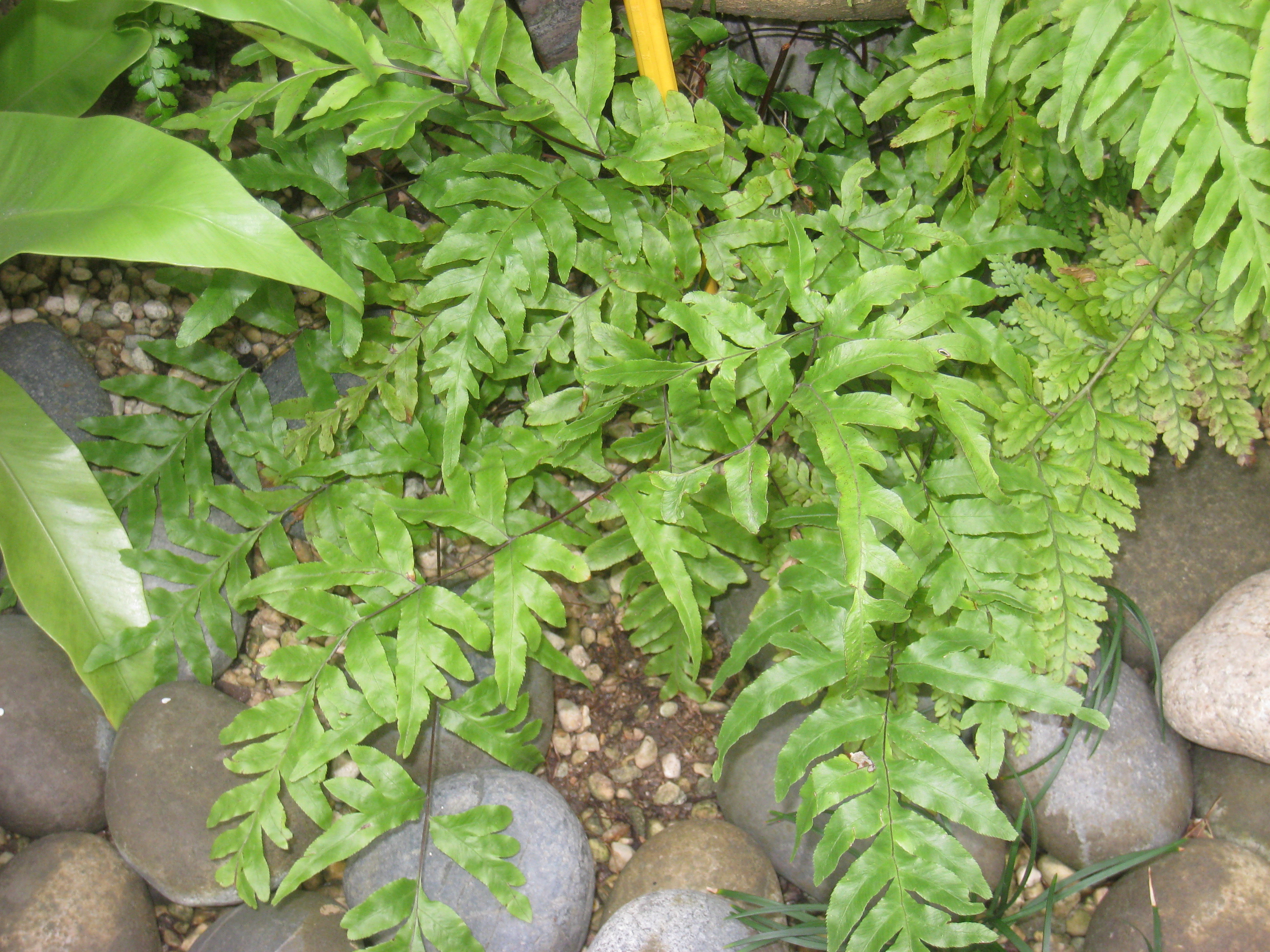

Scientific classification
- Kingdom: Plantae
- Clade: Tracheophytes
- Division: Polypodiophyta
- Class: Polypodiopsida
- Order: Polypodiales
- Family: Pteridaceae
- Genus: Pteris
- Species: P. semipinnata

Binomial name
- Pteris semipinnata L.

= Pteris semipinnata =

Species of fern

Pteris semipinnata is a species of fern in the subfamily Pteridoideae of the family Pteridaceae. It is mainly distributed in tropical regions, such as southern China, Taiwan, the Philippines, Vietnam, Laos, Thailand, Myanmar, Malaysia, Sri Lanka and northern India. It is also found in Japan (Ryukyu Islands) and Bhutan. Pteris semipinnata grows in open forests, on the acid soil near streams or rocks, below 900 meters above sea level.

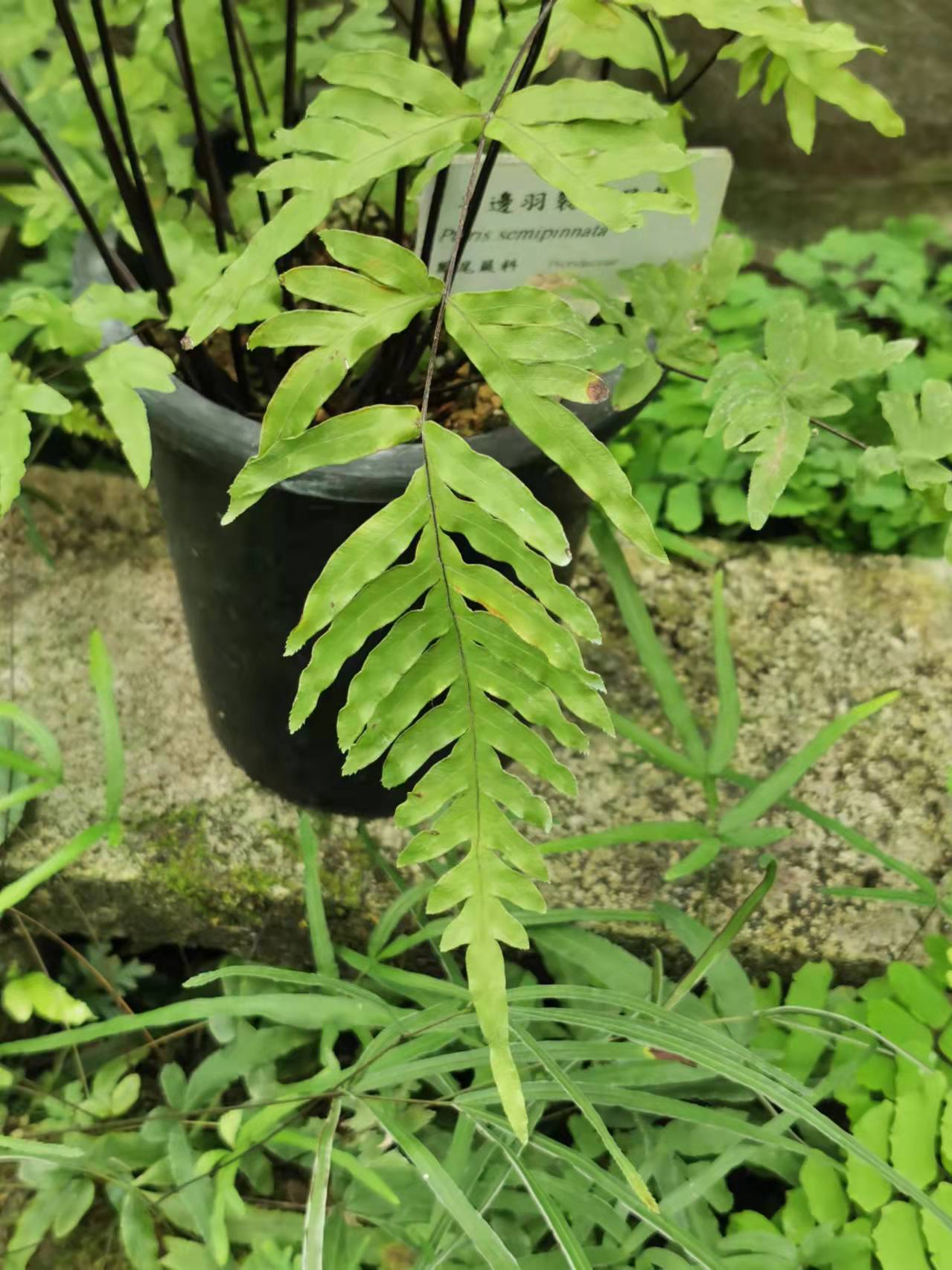

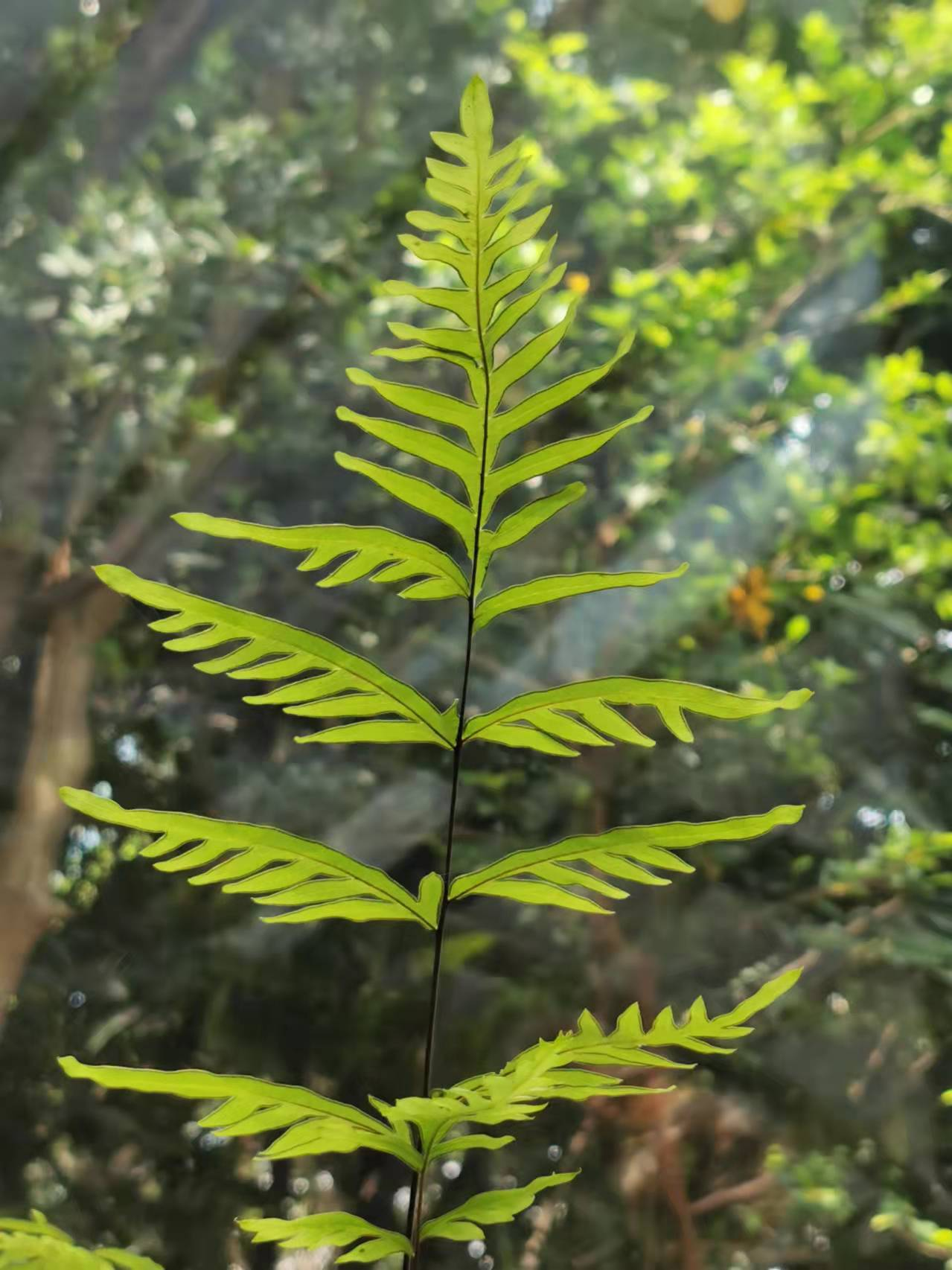
