= Pteris sylhetensis =

Scientific classification
- Kingdom: Plantae
- Clade: Tracheophytes
- Division: Polypodiophyta
- Class: Polypodiopsida
- Order: Polypodiales
- Family: Pteridaceae
- Genus: Pteris
- Species: P. sylhetensis

Binomial name
- Pteris sylhetensis Fraser-Jenk. & Sushil K. Singh

Species of fern

Pteris sylhetensis is a species of fern in the genus Pteris, that was first described in 2018, belonging to the family Pteridaceae, subfamily Pteridoideae. This species is native to tropical and subtropical regions, with a distribution primarily centered in parts of Asia. It is recognized for its ecological adaptability and potential ornamental value, typical of many Pteris species.
