= Pteris longifolia =

Scientific classification
- Kingdom: Plantae
- Clade: Tracheophytes
- Division: Polypodiophyta
- Class: Polypodiopsida
- Order: Polypodiales
- Family: Pteridaceae
- Genus: Pteris
- Species: P. longifolia

Binomial name
- Pteris longifolia L.

Species of fern

Pteris longifolia, the longleaf brake is a species of fern in the Pteridoideae subfamily of the Pteridaceae.
