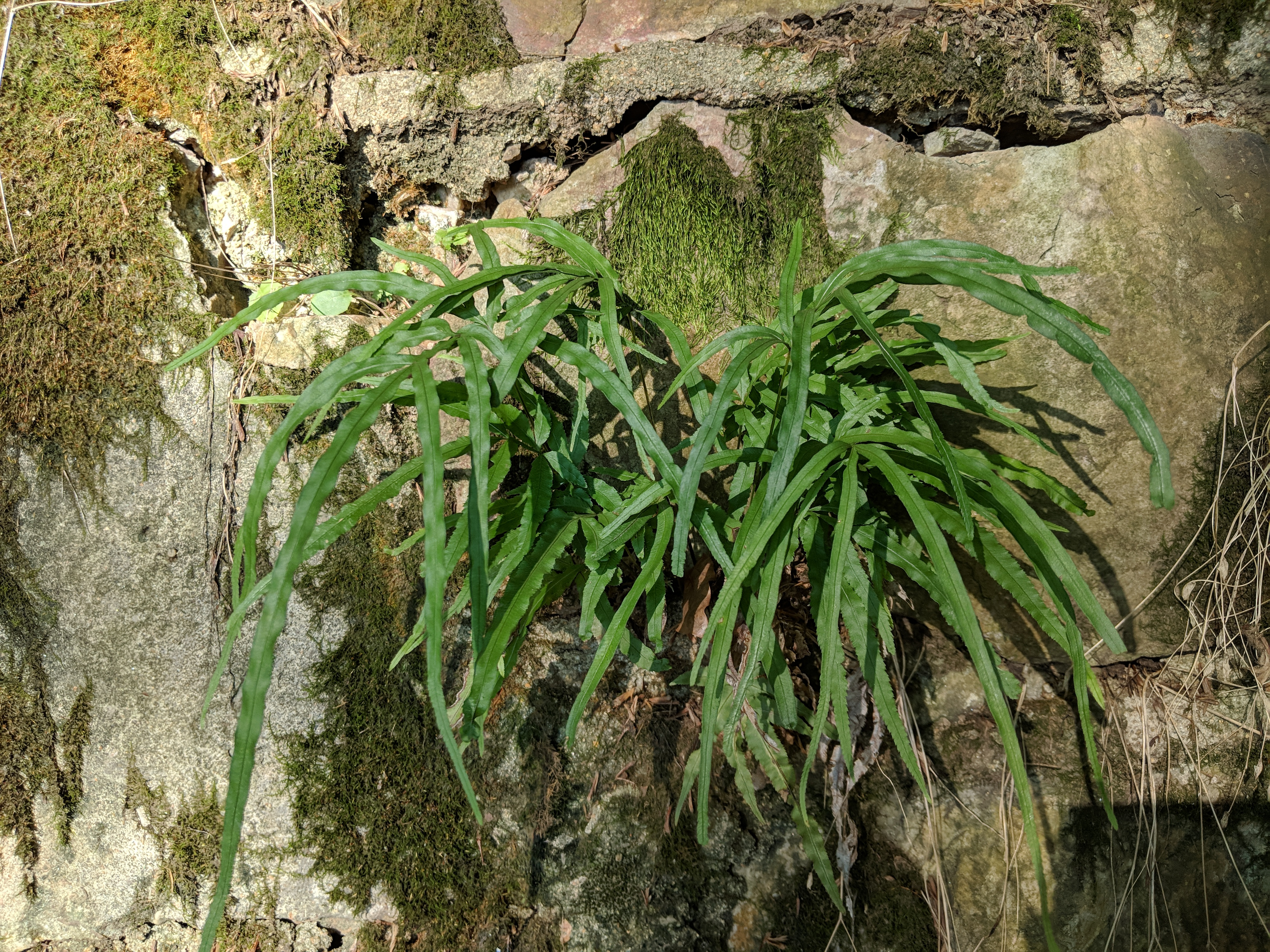
- On a ruined wall in Central China Normal University
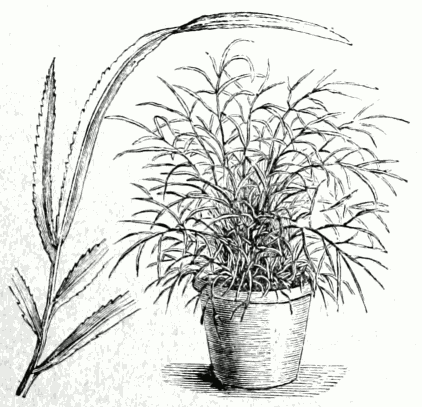
- Botanical illustration

Scientific classification
- Kingdom: Plantae
- Clade: Tracheophytes
- Division: Polypodiophyta
- Class: Polypodiopsida
- Order: Polypodiales
- Family: Pteridaceae
- Genus: Pteris
- Species: P. multifida

Binomial name
- Pteris multifida Poir.

Synonyms
- Pteris multifida f. serrulata R.H.Miao; Pteris serrulata L.f.; Pteris serrulata (R.H.Miao) Y.H.Yan; Pteris serrulata angusta B.S.Williams ex J.Dix; Pteris serrulata var. variegata Regel; Pycnodoria multifida (Poir.) Small

= Pteris multifida =

Species of plant

Pteris multifida, the spider brake, is a species of fern in the family Pteridaceae. It is native to central and southern China, Korea, Japan, the Ryukyus, Taiwan, and Vietnam. A shade-loving lithophyte with fronds reaching at most 60 cm (24 in), it is typically found growing on old walls, and is a rare example of a fern synanthrope. Consequently it has been introduced to many locales around the world, including many of the United States, some of the Caribbean islands, Bolivia, Uruguay, the United Kingdom, central Europe, Italy, Romania, Uganda, the Indian Subcontinent, Thailand, and the Philippines, and is known by many local common names, including Chinese brake, spider fern, Huguenot fern, ribbon fern, and saw-leaved bracken.
