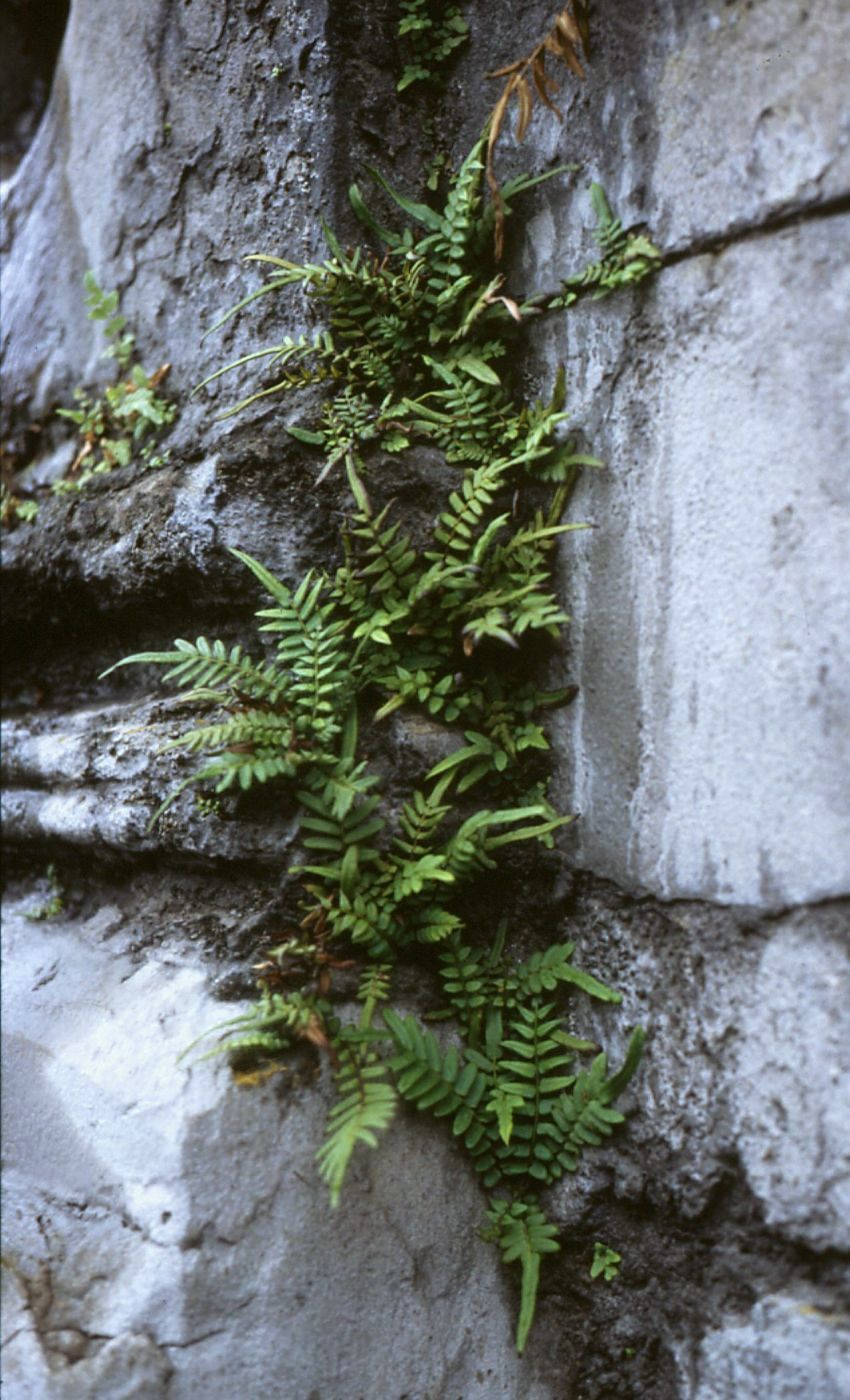
- Pteris vittata

Scientific classification
- Kingdom: Plantae
- Clade: Tracheophytes
- Division: Polypodiophyta
- Class: Polypodiopsida
- Order: Polypodiales
- Family: Pteridaceae
- Subfamily: Pteridoideae
- Genus: Pteris; L.

Type species
- Pteris longifolia L. 1753

Species
- See text

Synonyms
- Afropteris Alston 1956; Cryptogramme series Anopteris Prantl 1882; Anopteris Prantl 1882 ex Diels 1899; Campteria Presl 1836 nom. superfl.; Copelandiopteris Stone 1973; Hemipteris Rosenstock 1908; Heterophlebium Fée 1850-52; Heteropteris Presl & von Ettingshausen 1865 non Fée 1869 non (sic) Kunth 1822 non Dieis 1899; Idiopteris Walker 1957; Lathyropteris Christ 1907; Lemapteris Rafinesque 1819; Litobrochia Presl 1836; Neurocallis Fée 1845; Ochropteris Smith 1841; Peripteris Rafinesque 1815; Phyllitis Rafinesque 1819 non Hill 1756 non Moench 1794; Platyzoma Brown 1810; Pteridium Rafinesque 1814 non Gleditsch ex Scopoli 1760; Pterilis Rafinesque 1830 non (sic) Rafinesque 1819; Pteripteris Rafinesque 1819; Pycnodoria Presl 1849-51; Schizopteris Hillebrand 1874 non Brongniart 1828; Schizostege Presl 1849-51 ex Hillebrand 1888; Schizostegopsis Copeland 1958; Spathepteris Presl 1846; Thelypteris Adanson 1763 non Schmid. 1763

= Pteris =

Genus of ferns in the subfamily Pteridoideae

Pteris (brake) is a genus of about 300 species of ferns in the subfamily Pteridoideae of the family Pteridaceae. They are native to tropical and subtropical regions, southward to New Zealand, Australia, and South Africa, north to Japan and North America. 78 species (35 endemic) are found in China. Some species of Pteris have considerable economic and ecological value, such as Pteris multifida, Pteris ensiformis, Pteris vittata can be used for ornamental purposes; as a hyperaccumulator, Pteris multifida and Pteris vittata can be used to control soil pollution.

Many of them have linear frond segments, and some have sub-palmate division. Like other members of the Pteridaceae, the frond margin is reflexed over the marginal sori. The outermost layer is the single layered epidermis without stomata. The cortex is differentiated into outer and inner cortical region. The vascular cylinder is an amphiphloic siphonostele.

The term "brake", used for members of this genus, is a Middle English word for "fern" from southern England. Its derivation is unclear, and is generally thought to be related to "bracken", whereby the latter word has been assumed to be a plural, as with "children", and the former word a back-formation. However it may have a separate derivation.

The Latin genus name Pteris refers to the Greek name for fern (also meaning feathery).

== Phylogeny ==
Fern Tree of Life

- - - (Platyzoma)
      P. platyzomopsis Christenhusz & H.Schneid.
    - (Pteris)
      - section Moluccanae
      - - section Heterophlebium
        - section Pteris
  - - (Campteria)
      - section Tremulae
      - - - section Denticulatae
          - - section Tripedipteris
            - - Clade 1
              - - section Lithobrochia
                - - section Dentatae
                  - - section Mutilatae
                    - section Creticae
        - - section Semipinnatae
          - - section Hypsopodium
            - - section Excelsae
              - - section Cadierii
                - section Campteria

Selected species

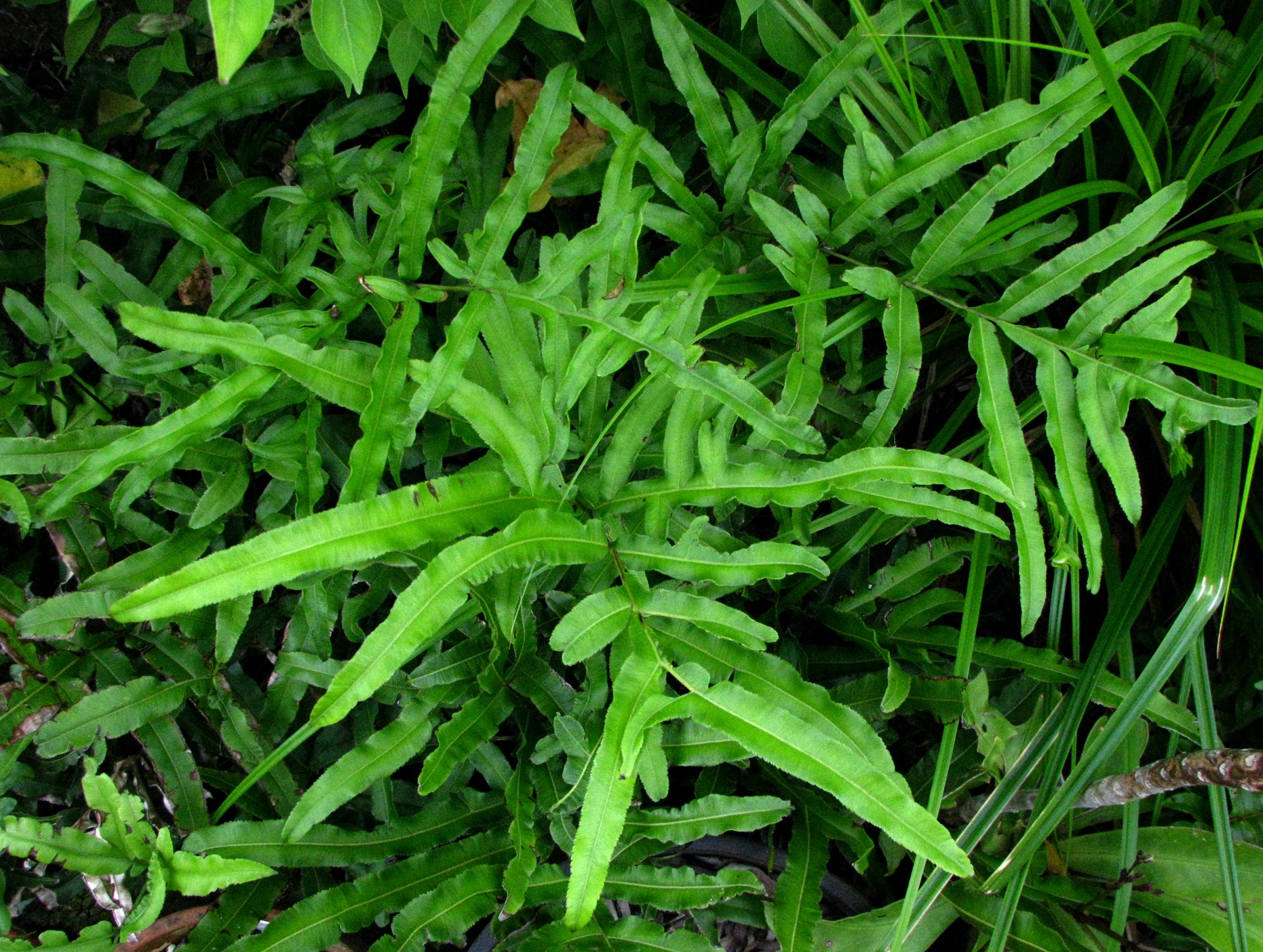
Pteris hillebrandii

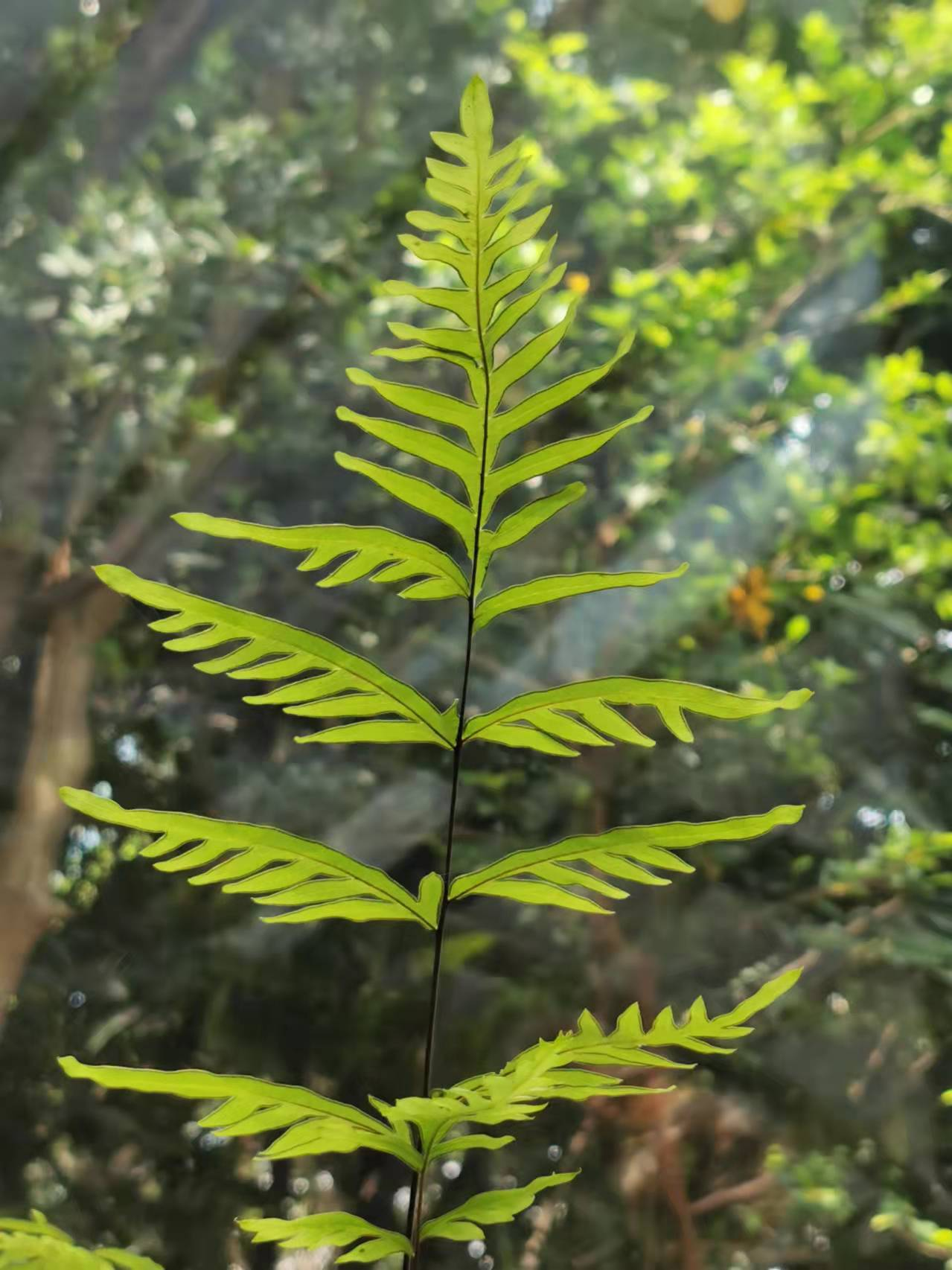
Pteris semipinnata

- Pteris aberrans Alderw.
- Pteris abyssinica Hieron.
- Pteris actiniopteroides Christ
- Pteris adscensionis Sw.
- Pteris albersii Hieron.
- Pteris albertiae Arbelaez
- Pteris altissima Poir.
- Pteris amoena Bl.
- Pteris angustata (Fée) C. Morton
- Pteris angustipinna Tagawa
- Pteris angustipinnula Ching & S.H.Wu
- Pteris appendiculifera Alderw.
- Pteris arborea L.
- Pteris argyraea Moore
- Pteris aspericaulis Wall. ex Hieron.
- Pteris asperula J. Sm. ex Hieron.
- Pteris atrovirens Willd.
- Pteris auquieri Pichi-Serm.
- Pteris austrosinica (Ching) Ching
- Pteris bahamensis (Agardh) Fée
- Pteris bakeri C. Chr.
- Pteris baksaensis Ching
- Pteris balansae Fourn.
- Pteris bambusoides Gepp
- Pteris barbigera Ching
- Pteris barklyae (Baker) Mett
- Pteris barombiensis Hieron.
- Pteris bavazzanoi Pichi-Serm.
- Pteris beecheyana Ag.
- Pteris bella Tagawa
- Pteris berteroana Ag.
- Pteris biaurita L.
- Pteris biformis Splitg.
- Pteris blanchetiana Presl ex Ettingsh.
- Pteris blumeana Agardh
- Pteris boninensis H. Ohba
- Pteris brassii C. Chr.
- Pteris brevis Copel.
- Pteris brooksiana Alderw.
- Pteris buchananii Bak. ap. Sim.
- Pteris buchtienii Rosenst.
- Pteris burtonii Bak.
- Pteris cadieri Christ
- Pteris caesia Copel.
- Pteris caiyangheensis L.L. Deng
- Pteris calcarea Kurata
- Pteris calocarpa (Copel.) M. Price
- Pteris carsei Braggins & Brownsey
- Pteris catoptera Kze.
- Pteris chiapensis A. R. Sm.
- Pteris chilensis Desv.
- Pteris christensenii Kjellberg
- Pteris chrysodioides (Fée) Hook.
- Pteris ciliaris Eat.
- Pteris clemensiae Copel.
- Pteris comans Forst.
- Pteris commutata Kuhn
- Pteris concinna Hew.
- Pteris confertinervia Ching
- Pteris confusa T. G. Walker
- Pteris congesta Prado
- Pteris consanguinea Mett. ex Kuhn
- Pteris coriacea Desv.
- Pteris crassiuscula Ching & Wang
- Pteris cretica L.
- Pteris croesus Bory
- Pteris cryptogrammoides Ching
- Pteris cumingii Hieron.
- Pteris dactylina Hook.
- Pteris daguensis (Hieron.) Lellinger
- Pteris dalhousiae Hook.
- Pteris dataensis Copel.
- Pteris dayakorum Bonap.
- Pteris decrescens Christ
- Pteris decurrens Presl
- Pteris deflexa Link
- Pteris deltea Ag.
- Pteris deltodon Bak.
- Pteris deltoidea Copel.
- Pteris dentata Forsskal
- Pteris denticulata Sw.
- Pteris dispar Kze.
- Pteris dissimilis (Fee) Chr.
- Pteris dissitifolia Bak.
- Pteris distans J. Sm.
- Pteris droogmaniana L. Linden
- Pteris edanyoi Copel.
- Pteris ekmanii C. Chr.
- Pteris elmeri Christ ex Copel.
- Pteris elongatiloba Bonap.
- Pteris endoneura M. Price
- Pteris ensiformis Burm.
- Pteris esquirolii Christ
- Pteris excelsa Gaud.
- Pteris famatinensis Sota
- Pteris fauriei Hieron.
- Pteris finotii Christ
- Pteris flava Goldm.
- Pteris formosana Bak.
- Pteris fraseri Mett. ex Kuhn
- Pteris friesii Hieron.
- Pteris gallinopes Ching
- Pteris geminata Wall.
- Pteris gigantea Willd.
- Pteris glaucovirens Goldm.
- Pteris goeldii Christ
- Pteris gongalensis T. G. Walker
- Pteris grandifolia L.
- Pteris grevilleana Wall. ex Agardh
- Pteris griffithii Hook.
- Pteris griseoviridis C. Chr.
- Pteris guangdongensis Ching
- Pteris guizhouensis Ching
- Pteris haenkeana Presl
- Pteris hamulosa Christ
- Pteris hartiana Jenm.
- Pteris heteroclita Desv.
- Pteris heteromorpha Fée
- Pteris heterophlebia Kze.
- Pteris hillebrandii Copel.
- Pteris hirsutissima Ching
- Pteris hirtula (C. Chr.) C. Morton
- Pteris hispaniolica Maxon
- Pteris holttumii C. Chr.
- Pteris hondurensis Jenm.
- Pteris hookeriana Ag.
- Pteris hossei Hieron.
- Pteris hostmanniana Ettingsh.
- Pteris hui Ching
- Pteris humbertii C. Chr.
- Pteris hunanensis C.M.Zhang
- Pteris inaequalis (Fée) Jenm.
- Pteris incompleta Cav.
- Pteris inermis (Rosenstock) Sota
- Pteris insignis Mett. ex Kuhn
- Pteris intricata Wright
- Pteris intromissa Christ
- Pteris irregularis Kaulf.
- Pteris iuzonensis Hieron.
- Pteris izuensis Ching
- Pteris johannis-winkleri C. Chr.
- Pteris junghuhnii (Reinw.) Bak.
- Pteris kawabatae Kurata
- Pteris keysseri Rosenst.
- Pteris khasiana (Clarke) Hieron.
- Pteris kidoi Kurata
- Pteris kinabaluensis C. Chr.
- Pteris kingiana Endl.
- Pteris kiuschiuensis Hieron.
- Pteris laevis Mett.
- Pteris lanceifolia Ag.
- Pteris lastii C. Chr.
- Pteris laurea Desv.
- Pteris laurisilvicola Kurata
- Pteris lechleri Mett.
- Pteris lepidopoda M.Kato & K.U.Kramer
- Pteris leptophylla Sw.
- Pteris liboensis P.S.Wang
- Pteris ligulata Gaud.
- Pteris limae Brade
- Pteris linearis Poir.
- Pteris litoralis Rechinger
- Pteris livida Mett.
- Pteris loheri Copel.
- Pteris longifolia L.
- Pteris longipes D. Don
- Pteris longipetiolulata Lellinger
- Pteris longipinna Hayata
- Pteris longipinnula Wall.
- Pteris luederwaldtii Rosenst.
- Pteris luschnathiana (Kl.) Bak.
- Pteris luzonensis Hieron.
- Pteris lydgatei (Bak.) Christ
- Pteris macgregorii Copel.
- Pteris macilenta A. Rich.
- Pteris maclurei Ching
- Pteris maclurioides Ching
- Pteris macracantha Copel.
- Pteris macrodon Bak.
- Pteris macrophylla Copel.
- Pteris macroptera Link
- Pteris madagascarica Ag.
- Pteris majestica Ching
- Pteris malipoensis Ching
- Pteris manniana Mett. ex Kuhn
- Pteris melanocaulon Fée
- Pteris melanorhachis Copel.
- Pteris menglaensis Ching
- Pteris mertensioides Willd.
- Pteris mettenii Kuhn
- Pteris micracantha Copel.
- Pteris microdictyon (Fée) Hook.
- Pteris microlepis Pichi-Serm.
- Pteris microptera Mett. ex Kuhn
- Pteris mildbraedii Hieron.
- Pteris moluccana Bl.
- Pteris monghaiensis Ching
- Pteris montis-wilhelminae Alston
- Pteris morii Masam.
- Pteris mucronulata Copel.
- Pteris multiaurita Ag.
- Pteris multifida Poir.
- Pteris muricata Hook.
- Pteris muricatopedata Arbelaez
- Pteris muricella Fée
- Pteris mutilata L.
- Pteris natiensis Tagawa
- Pteris navarrensis H. Christ
- Pteris nipponica Shieh
- Pteris novae-caledoniae Hook.
- Pteris obtusiloba Ching & S.H.Wu
- Pteris occidentalisinica Ching
- Pteris olivacea Ching in Ching & S. H. Wu
- Pteris opaca J. Sm.
- Pteris oppositipinnata Fée
- Pteris orientalis Alderw.
- Pteris orizabae M. Martens & Galeotti
- Pteris oshimensis Hieron.
- Pteris otaria Bedd.
- Pteris pachysora (Copel.) M. Price
- Pteris pacifica Hieron.
- Pteris paleacea Roxb.
- Pteris papuana Ces.
- Pteris parhamii Brownlie
- Pteris paucinervata Fée
- Pteris paucipinnata Alston
- Pteris paulistana Rosenst.
- Pteris pearcei Bak.
- Pteris pedicellata Copel.
- Pteris pediformis M.Kato & K.U.Kramer
- Pteris pellucida Presl
- Pteris perrieriana C. Chr.
- Pteris perrottetii Hieron.
- Pteris philippinensis Fée
- Pteris phuluangensis Tag. & Iwatsuki
- Pteris pilosiuscula Desv.
- Pteris plumbea Christ
- Pteris pluricaudata Copel.
- Pteris podophylla Sw.
- Pteris polita Link
- Pteris polyphylla (Presl) Ettingsh.
- Pteris porphyrophlebia C. Chr. & Ching
- Pteris praetermissa T. G. Walker
- Pteris preussii Hieron.
- Pteris prolifera Hieron.
- Pteris propinqua J. Agardh
- Pteris pseudolonchitis Bory ex Willd.
- Pteris pseudopellucida Ching
- Pteris pteridioides (Hook.) Ballard
- Pteris puberula Ching
- Pteris pulchra Schlecht. & Cham.
- Pteris pungens Willd.
- Pteris purdoniana Maxon
- Pteris purpureorachis Copel.
- Pteris quadriaurita Retz.
- Pteris quinquefoliata (Copel.) Ching
- Pteris quinquepartita Copel.
- Pteris radicans Christ
- Pteris ramosii Copel.
- Pteris rangiferina Presl ex Miq.
- Pteris reducta Bak.
- Pteris remotifolia Bak.
- Pteris reptans T.G. Walker
- Pteris rigidula Copel.
- Pteris rosenstockii C. Chr.
- Pteris roseo-lilacina Hieron.
- Pteris ryukyuensis Tagawa
- Pteris satsumana Kurata
- Pteris saxatilis Carse
- Pteris scabra Bory ex Willd.
- Pteris scabripes Wall.
- Pteris schlechteri Brause
- Pteris schwackeana Christ
- Pteris semiadnata Phil.
- Pteris semipinnata L.
- Pteris sericea (Fée) Christ
- Pteris setigera (Hook. ex Beddome) Nair
- Pteris setuloso-costulata Hayata
- Pteris shimenensis C.M.Zhang
- Pteris shimianensis H.S.Kung
- Pteris silvatica Alderw.
- Pteris similis Kuhn
- Pteris simplex Holtt.
- Pteris sintenensis (Masam.) C.M.Kuo
- Pteris speciosa Mett. ex Kuhn
- Pteris splendens Kaulf.
- Pteris splendida Ching
- Pteris squamaestipes C. Chr. & Tardieu
- Pteris squamipes Copel.
- Pteris stenophylla Wall. ex Hook. & Grev.
- Pteris stridens Ag.
- Pteris striphnophylla Mickel
- Pteris subindivisa Clarke
- Pteris subquinata (Wall. ex Bedd.) Agardh
- Pteris subsimplex Ching
- Pteris sumatrana Bak.
- Pteris swartziana Ag.
- Pteris sylhetensis Fraser-Jenk. & Sushil K. Singh
- Pteris taiwanensis Ching
- Pteris talamauana Alderw.
- Pteris tapeinidiifolia H.Itô
- Pteris tarandus M.Kato & K.U.Kramer
- Pteris tenuissima Ching
- Pteris togoensis Hieron.
- Pteris torricelliana Christ
- Pteris trachyrachis C. Chr.
- Pteris transparens Mett.
- Pteris tremula R. Br.
- Pteris treubii Alderw.
- Pteris tricolor Linden
- Pteris tripartita Sw.
- Pteris tussaci (Fée) Hook.
- Pteris umbrosa R. Br.
- Pteris undulatipinna Ching
- Pteris usambarensis Hier.
- Pteris vaupelii Hieron.
- Pteris venusta Kunze
- Pteris verticillata (L.) Lellinger & Proctor
- Pteris vieillardii Mett.
- Pteris viridissima Ching
- Pteris vitiensis Bak.
- Pteris vittata L.
- Pteris wallichiana Agardh
- Pteris wangiana Ching
- Pteris warburgii Christ
- Pteris werneri (Rosenstock) Holtt.
- Pteris whitfordii Copel.
- Pteris woodwardioides Bory ex Willd.
- Pteris wulaiensis C.M.Kuo
- Pteris yakuinsularis Kurata
- Pteris yamatensis (Tagawa) Tagawa
- Pteris zahlbruckneriana Endl.
- Pteris zippelii (Miq.) M.Kato & K.U.Kramer

== Cultivation and uses ==
Some of these ferns are popular in cultivation as houseplants. These smaller species are often called "table ferns".

Pteris vittata (commonly known as brake fern) was discovered to have the ability to "hyperaccumulate" (absorb large amounts of) arsenic from soil. The fern was growing at a central Florida site contaminated with large amounts of copper arsenate in the soil. Dr. Lena Q. Ma of the University of Florida later discovered that it had hyperaccumulated considerable amounts of arsenic from the soil. The discovery may lead to the use of Pteris vittata as a potential bioremediation plant.
