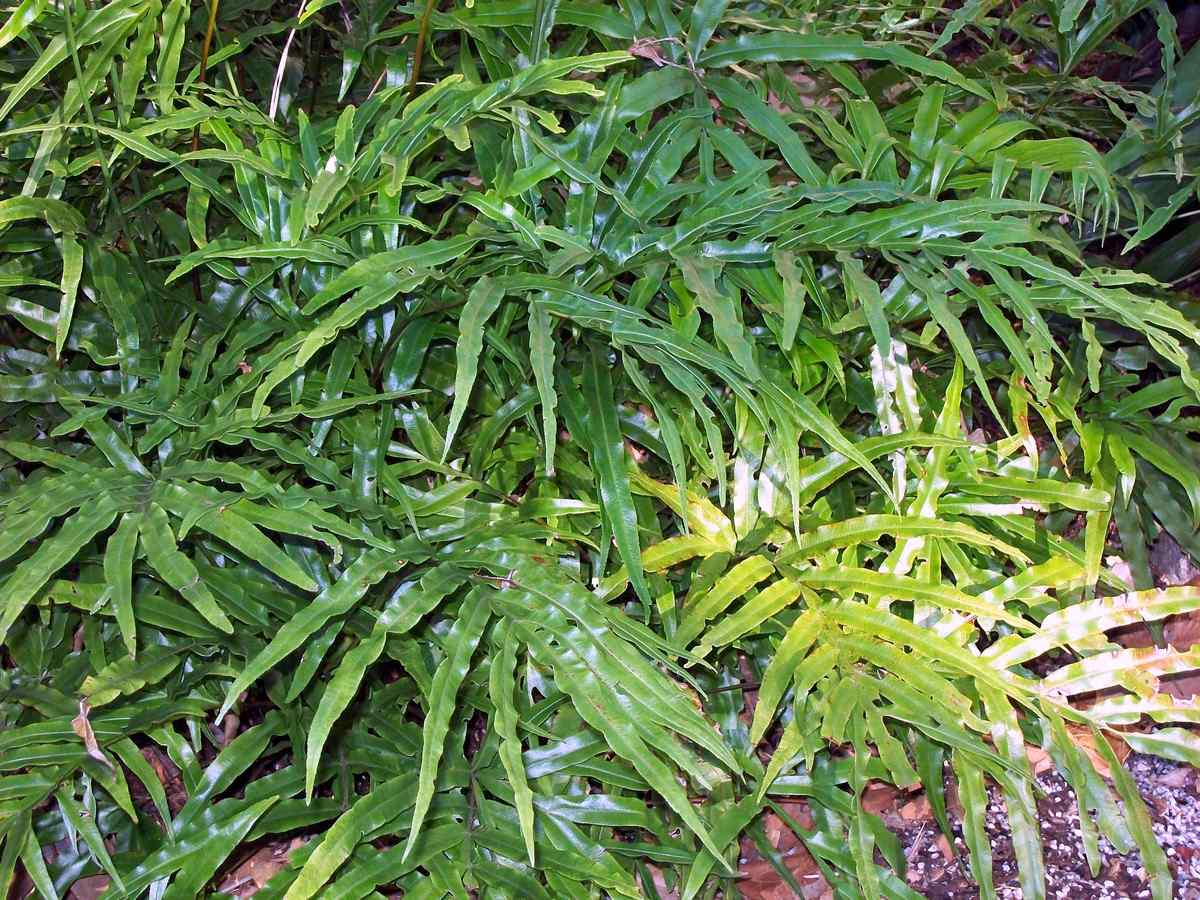
- Jungle brake from Dorrigo National Park, Australia

Scientific classification
- Kingdom: Plantae
- Clade: Tracheophytes
- Division: Polypodiophyta
- Class: Polypodiopsida
- Order: Polypodiales
- Family: Pteridaceae
- Genus: Pteris
- Species: P. umbrosa

Binomial name
- Pteris umbrosa R.Br.

= Pteris umbrosa =

Jungle brake

Species of fern

Pteris umbrosa is a fern from eastern Australia. The habitat of the jungle brake is rainforest where it can form large colonies in shaded moist situations. There are several populations of this fern in the northern suburbs of Sydney. However, it is not clear if they are indigenous or escapees from gardens.

The botanist Robert Brown published this plant in the year 1810, in his Prodromus Florae Novae Hollandiae.
