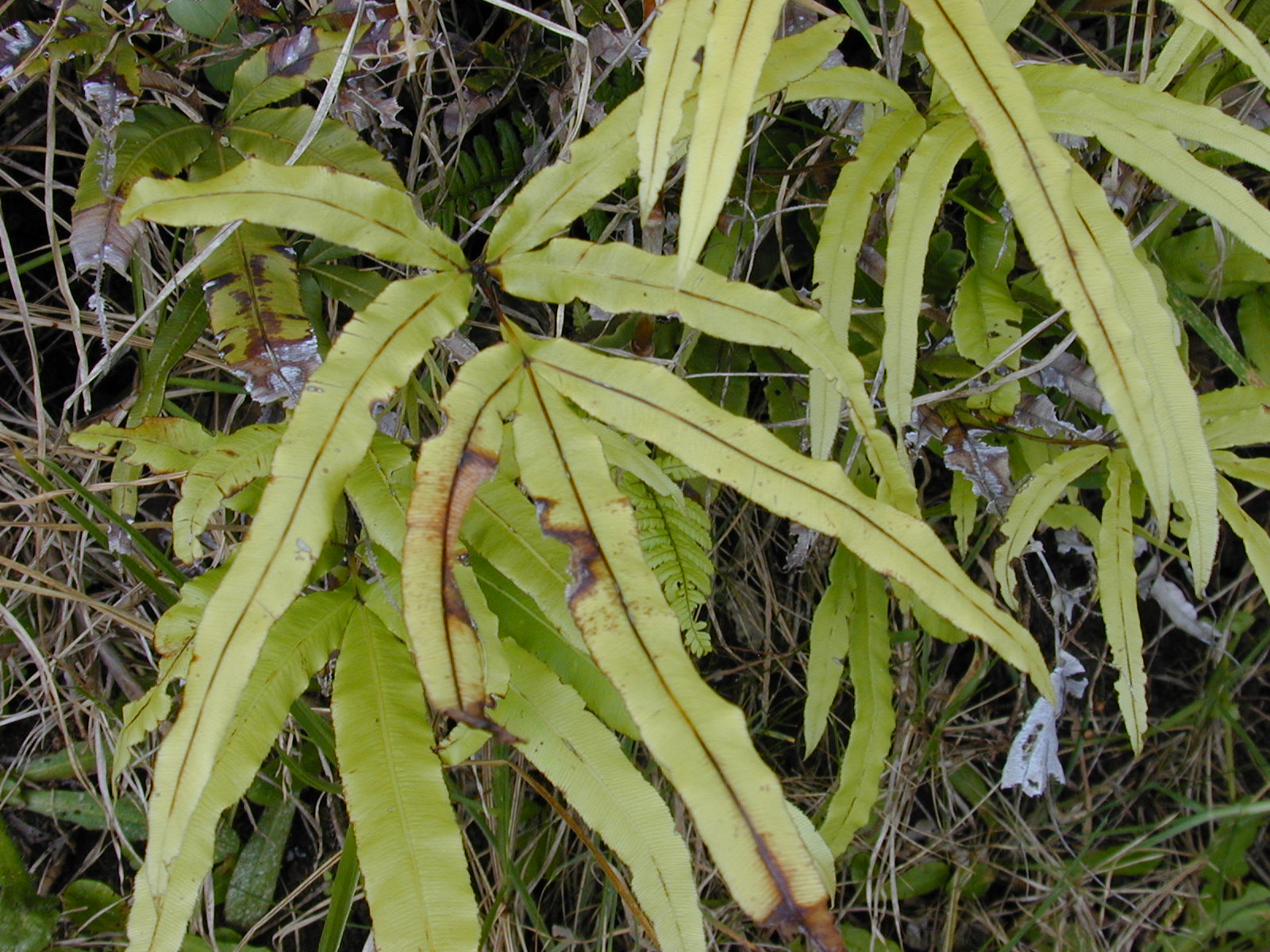
- Pteris cretica var. albolineata

Scientific classification
- Kingdom: Plantae
- Clade: Tracheophytes
- Division: Polypodiophyta
- Class: Polypodiopsida
- Order: Polypodiales
- Family: Pteridaceae
- Genus: Pteris
- Species: P. cretica

Binomial name
- Pteris cretica L.

= Pteris cretica =

Species of fern

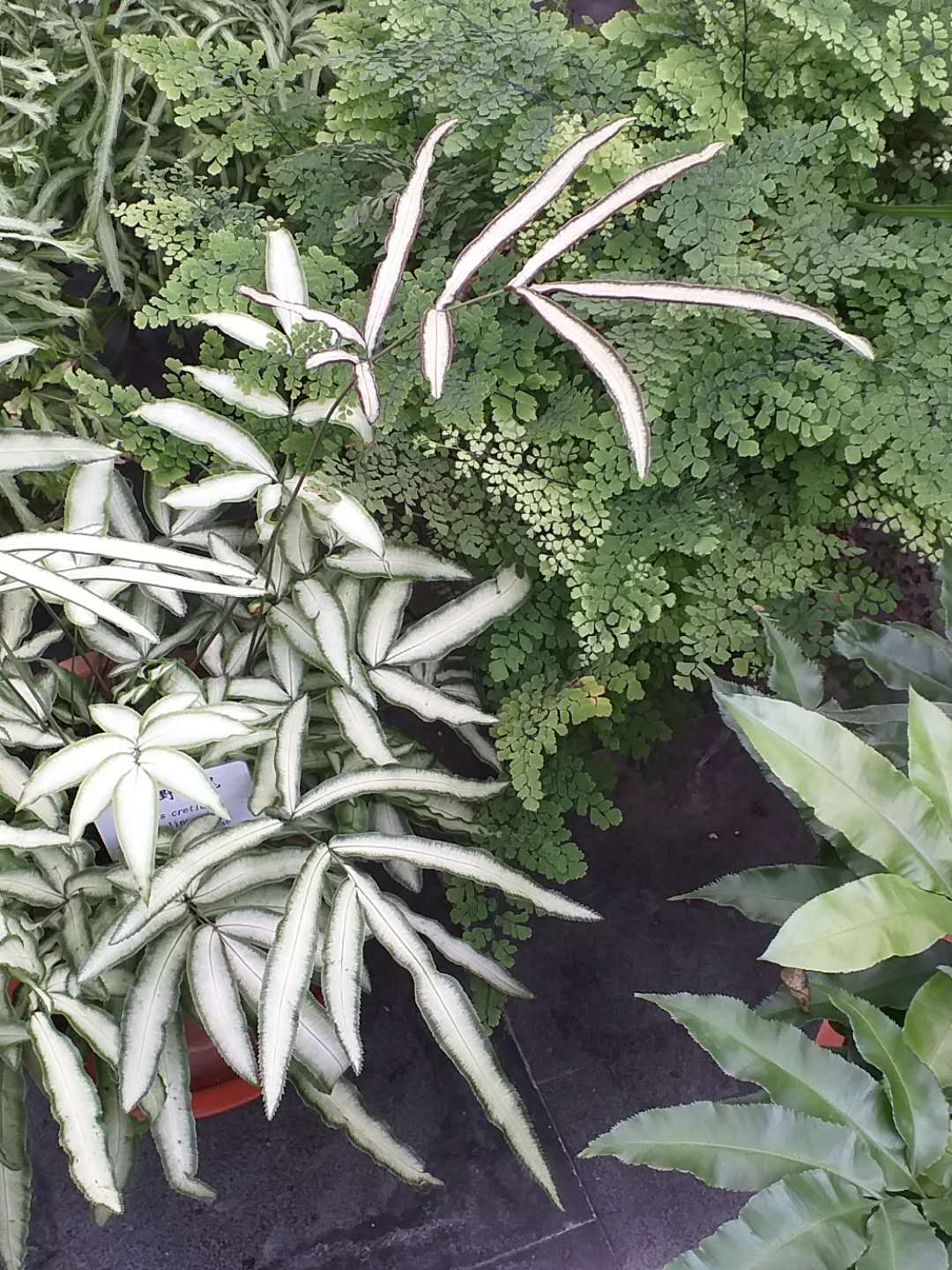
Pteris cretica 'Albolineata'. Vegetative leaves and sporophylls (upper, linear).

Pteris cretica, the Cretan brake, ribbon fern, or Cretan brake fern, is a species of evergreen fern in the family Pteridaceae, native to Europe, Asia and Africa.

== Description ==
The fern grows to 75 cm (30 in) tall by 60 cm (24 in) broad. It has arching pinnate fronds each bearing up to five pinnae.

== Taxonomy ==
According to Plants of the World Online there are 2 subspecies: Pteris cretica subsp. cretica and Pteris cretica subsp. laeta (Wall. ex Ettingsh.)

== Distribution ==
Pteris cretica subsp. cretica is native in an area from the Mediterranean to tropical Asia, in Africa, in Madagascar and on the Atlantic islands. There are findings in Gran Canaria, Spain, France, Corsica, Sardinia, Sicily, Italy (Lake Como and Lake Garda), Switzerland (Ticino on the shores of Lake Lugano and Lake Maggiore), Crimea, Greece (contrary to its name, Pteris cretica does not occur on Crete), Transcaucasia, Turkey, Lebanon-Syria. In Africa it is native in Yemen, Socotra, Algeria, Ethiopia, Angola, Kenya, Burundi, Rwanda, Malawi, Tanzania, Zambia, Democratic Republic of the Congo, Zimbabwe, Zaïre, Lesotho, Swaziland, South Africa, Madagascar. In Asia it occurs in Sri Lanka, India, Assam, Pakistan, Himalaya, Nepal, Bangladesh, Tibet, China (North-Central, South-Central, Southeast), Myanmar, Cambodia, Japan, Korea, Laos, Thailand, Vietnam, Taiwan, Nanshoto, Philippines, Ascension, Réunion.

Pteris cretica is a neophyte introduced into the USA distributed via Mexico, Central America and Caribbean Islands to Colombia and Peru, Hawaii, New Zealand, Australia, the Azores. It is a neophyte in Great Britain, Hungary and the Netherlands.

The other subspecies Pteris cretica subsp. laeta is native in an area from East Turkey to tropical and subtropical Asia, the Indian subcontinent: Afghanistan, Assam, Cambodia, China South-Central, China Southeast, East Himalaya, India, Iran, Japan, Laos, Lesser Sunda Islands, Myanmar, Nepal, Pakistan, Philippines, Sri Lanka, Sulawesi, Taiwan, Thailand, Tibet, Transcaucasus, Turkey, Vietnam and West Himalaya.

== Cultivation ==
Pteris cretica is cultivated widely by plant nurseries. It is used in gardens in the ground and as a potted plant, and as a houseplant. The variety with variegated foliage, Pteris cretica var. albolineata, is also widely used, brightening shade gardens.

Both types thrive year round outdoors in subtropical climates, such as California. With a minimum temperature of 2 °C (36 °F), both require protection from frost, though the species is hardier and can be grown outdoors during the summer months in cold climates.

The species, and the variety P. cretica var. albolineata (syn. P. nipponica), have both gained the Royal Horticultural Society's Award of Garden Merit.

A relictual presence is certificated in the Italian peninsula Lazio (Ponte Terra gorge, San Vittorino, Rome).
