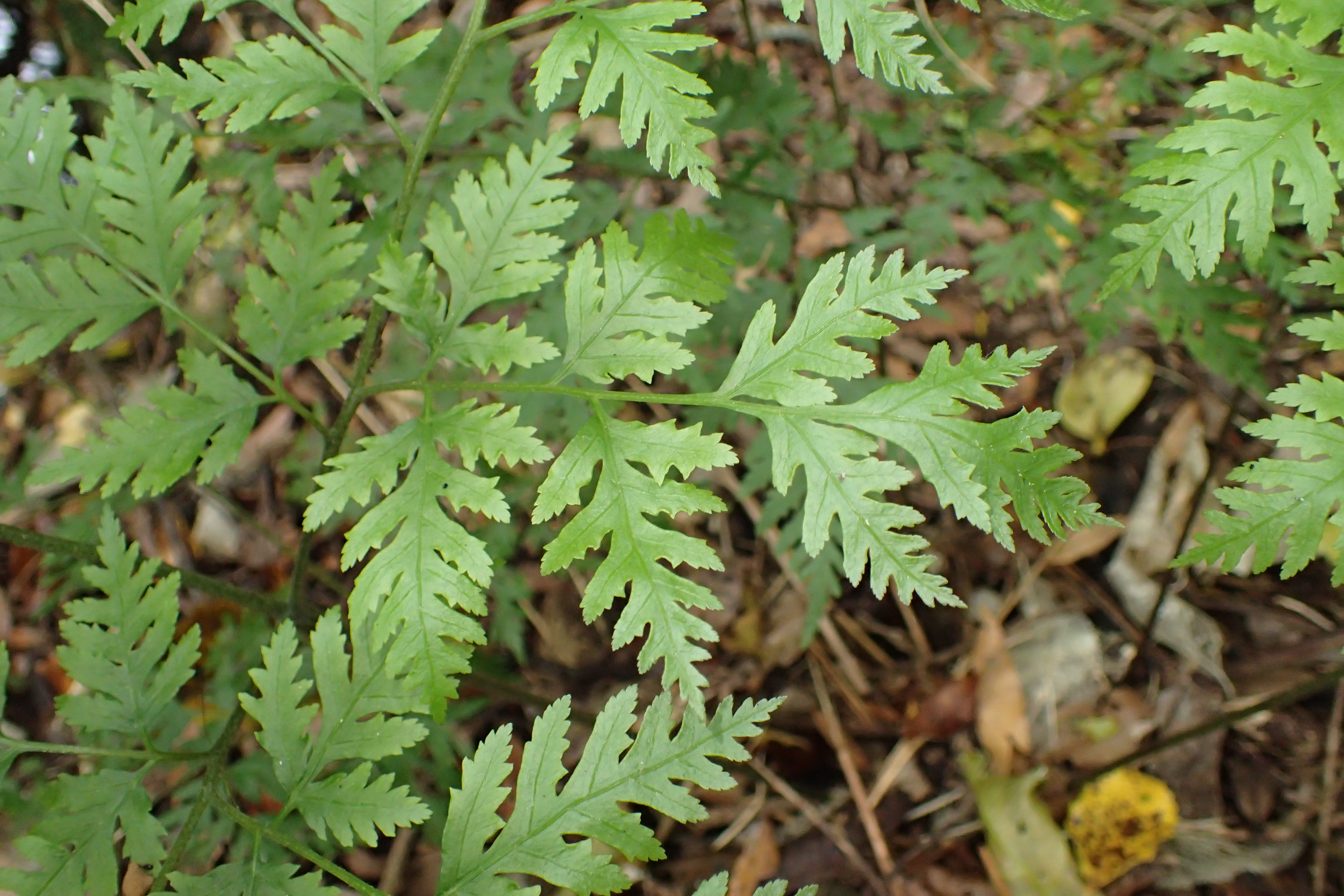

Scientific classification
- Kingdom: Plantae
- Clade: Tracheophytes
- Division: Polypodiophyta
- Class: Polypodiopsida
- Order: Polypodiales
- Family: Pteridaceae
- Genus: Pteris
- Species: P. macilenta

Binomial name
- Pteris macilenta A.Rich.

= Pteris macilenta =

Species of fern

Pteris macilenta is a species of fern endemic to New Zealand.

Pteris macilenta contains the following varieties:

- Pteris macilenta var. saxatilis
- Pteris macilenta var. pendula
- Pteris macilenta var. macilenta

== Description ==
Pteris macilenta is a terrestrial fern characterized by a typically erect, short, and slender rhizome that supports crowded stipes ranging from 10 to 30 cm in length. The stipes are dark brown towards the paleate base and pale brown above, with dark brown, the scales are long and gradually taper to a point. This species can reach up to 50 cm in height, with its abundance of fronds dependent on the quality of the habitat, and its size can be modest as 10 cm under poor conditions. The rhizome is not deeply buried, often ascending, with lateral roots and is marked by the presence of fallen stalk bases.

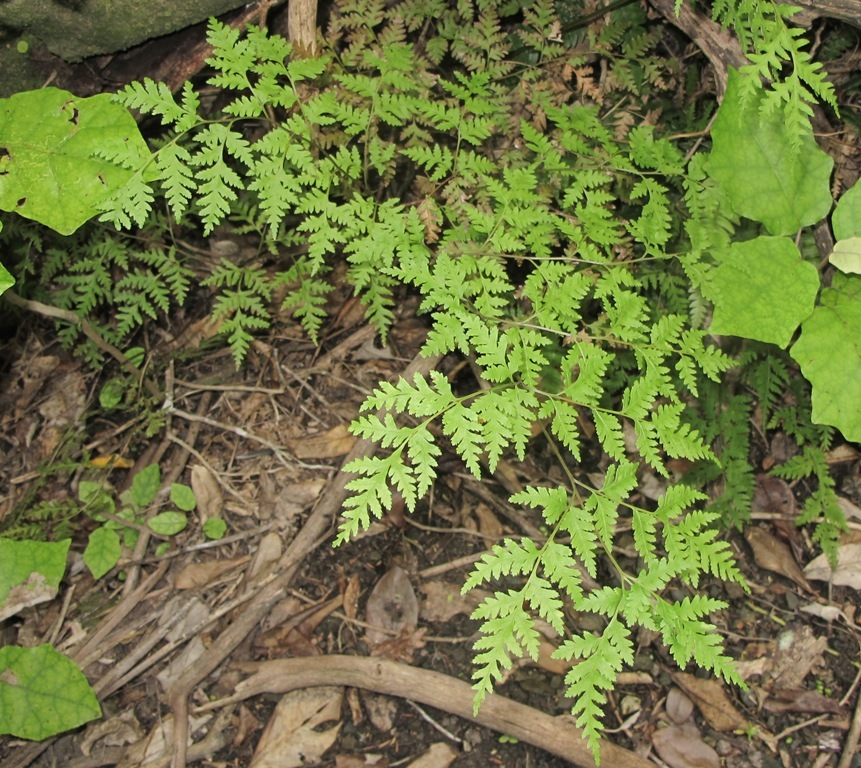
Sweet Fern (Pteris macilenta)

The fronds of P. macilenta are pale green, membranous, and flaccid, with a broadly deltoid shape and a size ranging from 20 to 90 cm in length and 15 to 50 cm in width. They exhibit a 2–3 pinnate structure with minutely punctate laminae. Veins demonstrate anastomosing patterns, especially along the smaller branches coming off the main vein. The pinnae, which are alternate to subopposite and often long-stalked, are deltoid to ovate-lanceolate and acuminate. The rachis is smooth and yellow-brown, narrowly winged in distal half, and bears pinnae with scattered scales. The lamina texture varies from sub-coriaceous to sub-membranous in sheltered plants. Coloration ranges from dark green in shaded environments to paler green in exposed ones, with yellowing common under extreme stress.

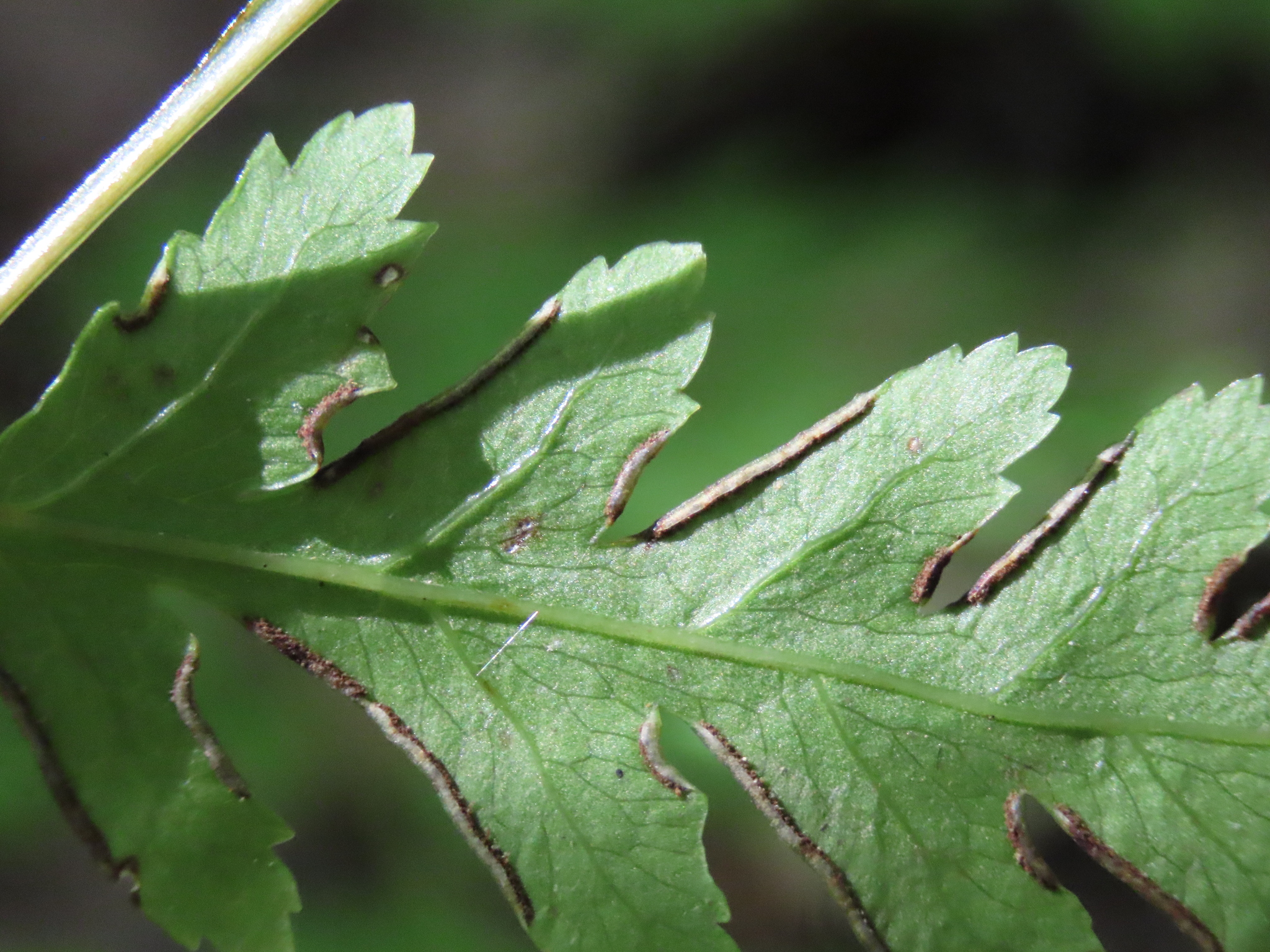
Pteris macilenta, abaxial surface of pinnae

This species is distinguished from P. saxatilis, a closely related species, by its larger size, slightly more coriaceous laminae, less widely spaced pinnae, and large spores measuring 41-46 μm in diameter. Moreover, P. macilenta can be identified by its alternate rather than sub-opposite secondary pinnae on the lower most primary pinnae and its non-overlapping pinnae that are usually herbaceous. Unlike P. epaleata, it has secondary pinnae that are more obviously stalked and ultimate segments that are shorter and broader.

Fertile pinnules in P. macilenta are similar in shape to sterile ones, and sori are usually copious and short, along sinuses, with the tips of segments barren. Sporangia are smaller than those found in related species, and the soral flap is narrow and firm. Occasionally, there are a few hair-like structures called paraphyses among the spores. The spores of P. macilenta have a polar diameter of 25 to 31 μm and an equatorial diameter of 36 to 29 μm, yielding a P:E ratio of 5.41:8, larger than those of P. carsei.

== Range ==
=== Natural global range ===
The genus (Pteris L.) is global presence, mainly in the tropical areas, with a few species extending southern regions to New Zealand, Tasmania, South Africa and South America. Pteris macilenta is a species endemic to New Zealand with a limited distribution.

=== New Zealand range ===
P. macilenta is found in New Zealand within specific regions across both North and South Island, as well as the Chatham Islands. In the North Island, its distribution includes Northland, Auckland, the Volcanic Plateau, Gisborne, Taranaki, and the Southern North Island, with a notable presence from Te Paki to Wellington. It predominantly occupies coastal and lowland areas, extending into montane districts, albeit rarely in the central North Island. Its growth is observed from sea level up to 800 meters, especially in the Coromandel Ranges and on Mt. Pirongia.

In the South Island, the species is commonly found in coastal and lowland regions between the Marlborough Sounds and Greymouth, and up to 520 meters near Nelson. Its presence extends to outlying areas in Canterbury and along the West Coast to Martins Bay.

== Habitat Preferences ==
P. macilenta prefers habitats ranging from coastal to montane regions in northern areas, predominantly occupying dry, less vegetated sites within forests. Its growth is commonly in a variety of settings including more open kauri, podocarp, beech, and broadleaved forests, as well as under manuka and kanuka shrub and Carex secta. It is much more common on the mainland than on the offshore islands. The species has an affinity for substrates such as scoria, greywacke, and limestone, favoring environments like stream banks, river terraces, wet gullies, clay banks, clearings, forest margins, roadside banks, coastal cliffs. It is especially prevalent over calcareous or other base-rich rocks, and often growing amongst the roots of the trees.

== Life cycle and phenology ==
=== Spores ===
New Zealand species, exhibit generally more narrow margins than their more tropical species, affecting sporangia exposure and fertility characteristics of the fronds.

=== Sporangia ===
Sporangia, produced along the marginal loop vein, mature mostly simultaneously, with species displaying two main groups based on sporangia size.

=== Germination ===
Pteris species typically showcase rapid germination, leading to the early development of the gametophyte, which can vary in form based on the environmental conditions and the presence of factors like antheridogens.

Post-germination growth rates differ, with some species growing faster than others. Gametophytes are typically cross-fertilized, and under moist conditions without direct watering, they can become long-lived, changing shape and continuing to produce sex organs. Antheridiogen are chemicals that influence the growth of male reproductive parts and are common in many plant genera. Post-germination growth rates differ, with some species growing faster than others.

=== Diet and foraging ===
Pteris macilenta favors soils in coastal to montane habitats, predominantly on alkaline rocks like limestone, indicating specific nutrient preferences. Found in shaded or semi-shaded environments, its distribution ranges from preferring clay slopes under karaka trees to adapting distinctively in limestone areas. Its occurrence along moisture-retaining yet well-drained sites such as riverbanks.

=== Parasites ===
Previous studies have documented the widespread occurrence of symbiotic phycomycetous infections in pteridophytes’ roots, with endophytic symbiosis common across most pteridophyte families except for some aquatic groups.

Based on Karen M. Cooper’s 1976 research about the incidence and characteristics of mycorrhizal fungi infecting the roots of P. macilenta, as part of a broader survey on New Zealand ferns, three samples of P. macilenta were collected from two different locations. All samples showed mycorrhizal infection, indicating a strong symbiotic relationship that aids in nutrient uptake and overall health. At least seven types of endogonaceous fungi were identified in fern roots, with mixed infections being common. Additionally, small quantities of ectotrophic mycorrhizas similar to those found in certain tree species were present, suggesting a diverse fungal community within the fern’s root system.

== Etymology ==
Pteris: a fern known to the ancient Greek, derives its name from the Greek word ‘pteron’.

== History of the New Zealand species ==
The first recorded collections of New Zealand’s Pteris species are found in the Banks and Solander collection. The Auckland Museum and Institute houses duplicates of P. tremula and P. macilenta (AKLL4335 and AKLL4334 respectively both N.Z.1769-70).

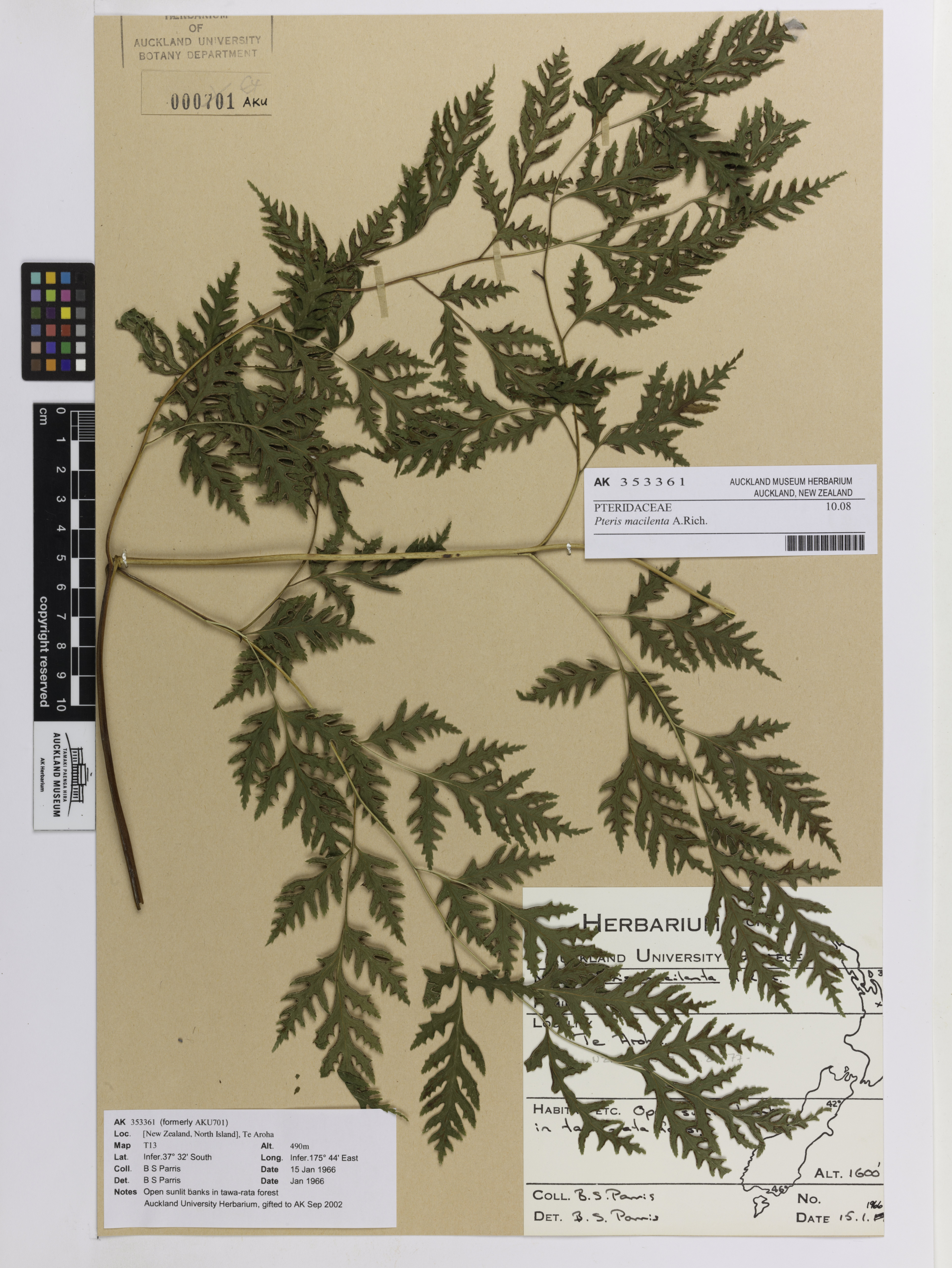
Pteris macilenta A.Rich. collected by Auckland War Memorial Museum Tāmaki Paenga Hira

== The original description from Richard, 1832 ==
The original description by Richard in 1832 was later translated from French by Braggins in 1975.

"this species is easily (very) remarkable because (of its) appearance or growth which distinguishes it at a glance from all the other species of the genus and which more or less links it with some species of Lindsaea. Its fronds are about 1.5 feet long at times even 2 feet and are made up of a very small number of pinnae (folioles) widely separated from one another and more or less deeply pinnatifid. The divisions of those pinnae are either whole or irregularly toothed at their tips, usually very glabrous. This species approaches Pteris vespertilionis La Billardiere: it is, however, quite distinct "

== Cytology ==
n = 60, n = 58, 2n = c. 116; 2n = c. 120.

== Chemotaxonomy ==
P. macilenta is unique within Pteris genus for containing leucoanthocyanins, specifically leucopelargonidin, a trait also present in its hybrids. Additionally, kaempferol appears to be confined to P. macilenta, its hybrids, and possibly P. pendula.

This indicates that chromatography can offer valuable distinctive features for making precise comparisons among these species, as it does in various other groups.

== Hybridization ==
Variability in P. macilenta typically occurs in regions where it coexists with Pteris carsei and P. saxatilis. It is probable resulting from hybridization and subsequent formation of hybrid swarms. Hybrid spores tend to appear abnormal due to the differing chromosome numbers of the parent species. Morphologically, P. macilenta is likely an allotetraploid, meaning it has double the usual number of chromosomes and likely evolved from two different species, though it lacks experimental evidence. All three species, P. macilenta, P. saxatilis, and P.carsei, share nearly identical rbcL gene sequences, indicating a close genetic relationship. Their exact relations within their clade are unclear, but they likely form part of small, independent radiations in the south-western Pacific, with no close relative among other species (Bouma et al, 2009).

== The taxonomic history of Pteris macilenta ==
As first described by Richard in 1832, has been subject to confusion and debate due to its morphological similarity to other species and subsequent reinterpretations by other authors. Initially, Richard’s comprehensive description and accompanying plate introduced P. macilenta as a new species, setting a foundation later built upon by botanists like Cunningham, W. J. Hooker and J. D. Hooker, who expanded the species concept to include similar-looking plants from other localities. This led to the description of related species and varieties, such as P. pendula by Colenso, which Cheeseman later demoted to a variety of P. macilenta. Over time, the name P. macilenta has been applied variable, complicating its taxonomic clarity.

Efforts to resolve these taxonomic issues include Braggins’ unpublished work in 1975, which suggested that P. macilenta as described by Richard is more accurately applied to what known as P. saxatilis, proposing P. pendula for the plant previously referred to as P. macilenta. This interpretation, however, has not been universally adopted, leading to continued ambiguity in the species’ nomenclature. The lectotype designation by Brownsey and Perrie in 2020, based on original material collected during the voyage of the Astrolabe, aimed to clarify the identify of P. macilenta. Despite these efforts, the historical application of the name and the existence of closely related taxa make the precise definition of P. macilenta challenging
