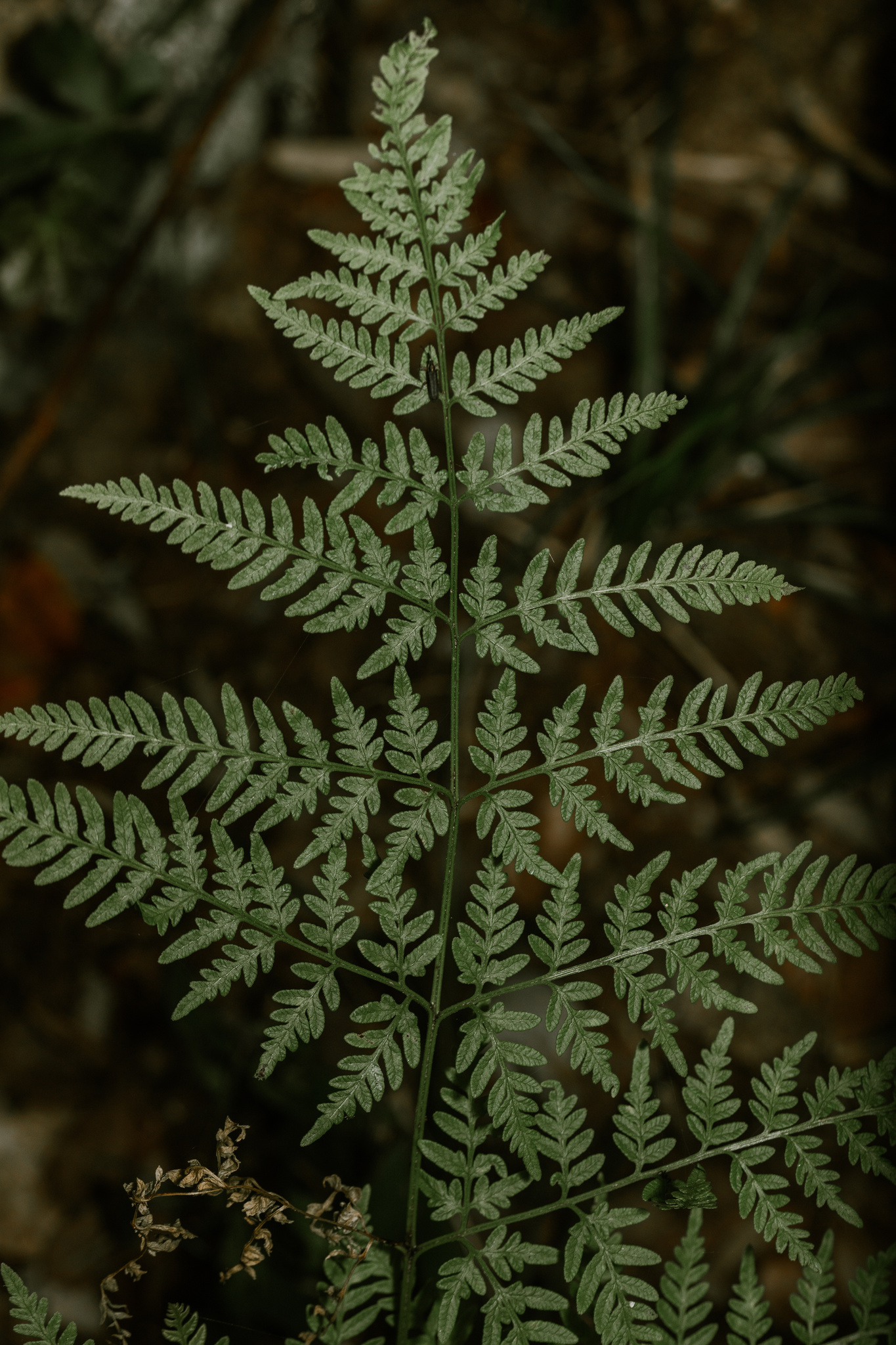

Scientific classification
- Kingdom: Plantae
- Clade: Tracheophytes
- Division: Polypodiophyta
- Class: Polypodiopsida
- Order: Polypodiales
- Family: Pteridaceae
- Genus: Pteris
- Species: P. chilensis

Binomial name
- Pteris chilensis Desv.

= Pteris chilensis =

Species of fern

Pteris chilensis is a species of fern in the family Pteridaceae. It is endemic to Chile, where it is distributed between the Coquimbo and the Los Rios regions, and also in the Juan Fernandez Islands.
