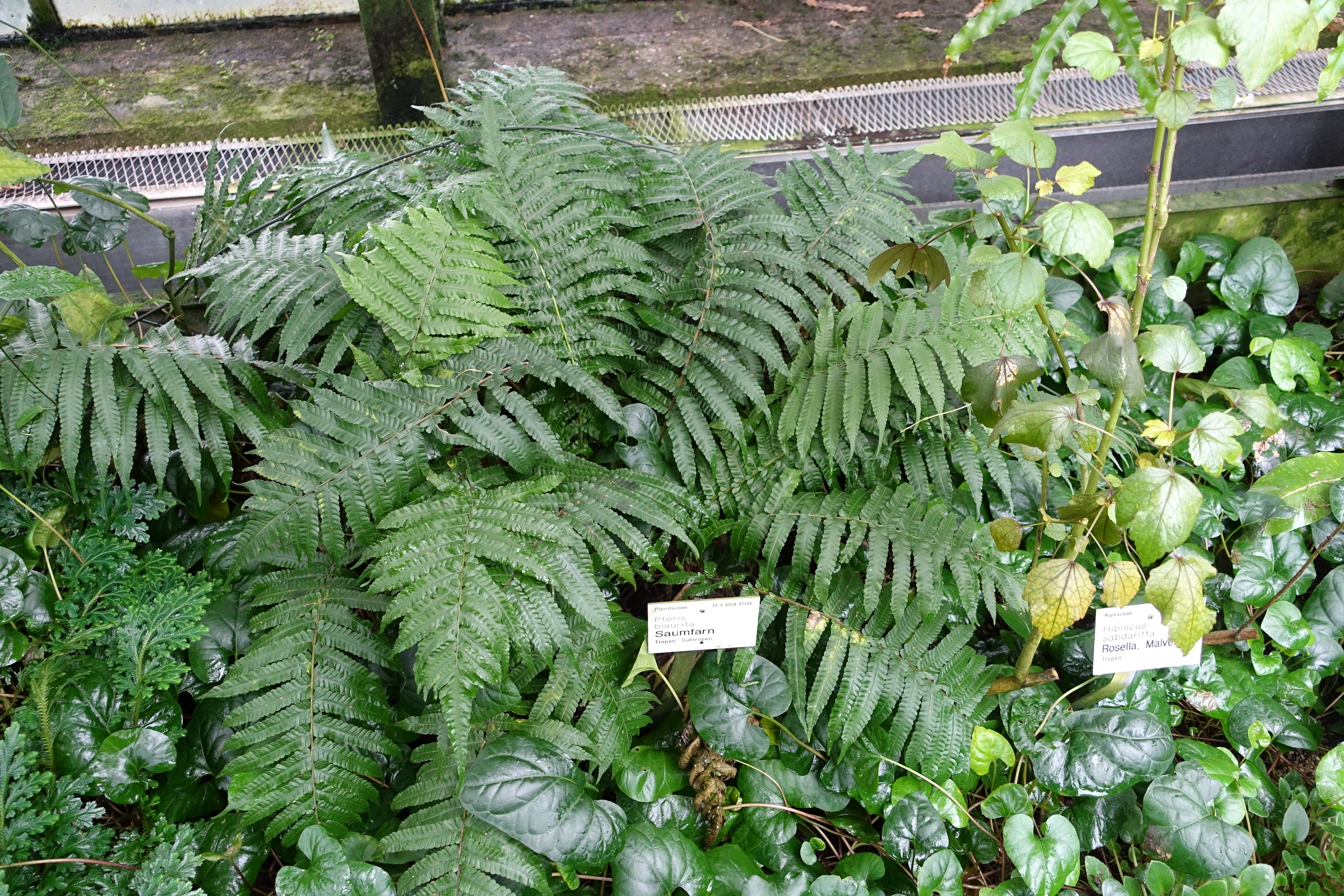

Scientific classification
- Kingdom: Plantae
- Clade: Tracheophytes
- Division: Polypodiophyta
- Class: Polypodiopsida
- Order: Polypodiales
- Family: Pteridaceae
- Genus: Pteris
- Species: P. biaurita

Binomial name
- Pteris biaurita L.

= Pteris biaurita =

Species of fern

Pteris biaurita, the thinleaf brake, is a fern species in the genus Pteris. It is widely distributed around the world, including Africa, the Americas, and Asia. The plants are 70–110 cm in height, with erect, woody rhizomes 2–2.5 cm in diameter, and the apex densely covered with brown scales.

== Synonyms ==
- Campteria biaurita (L.) Hook.
- Campteria galeotti (Fée) T. Moore
- Litobrochia biaurita (L.) J. Sm.
- Litobrochia galeottii Fée
- Pteris flavicaulis Hayata
