= Pteris melanocaulon =

Scientific classification
- Kingdom: Plantae
- Clade: Tracheophytes
- Division: Polypodiophyta
- Class: Polypodiopsida
- Order: Polypodiales
- Family: Pteridaceae
- Genus: Pteris
- Species: P. melanocaulon

Binomial name
- Pteris melanocaulon Fée

Species of fern

Pteris melanocaulon is a fern species in the subfamily Pteridoideae of the family Pteridaceae. It has been described as edible and no subspecies have been found. It has been found to be a metallophyte and probably has copper as an essential macro-nutrient.
