= Pteris lydgatei =

Conservation status
- Critically Imperiled (NatureServe)

Scientific classification
- Kingdom: Plantae
- Clade: Tracheophytes
- Division: Polypodiophyta
- Class: Polypodiopsida
- Order: Polypodiales
- Family: Pteridaceae
- Genus: Pteris
- Species: P. lydgatei

Binomial name
- Pteris lydgatei (Baker) Christ

Synonyms
- Cheilanthes lydgatei Baker

Species of fern

Pteris lydgatei is a rare fern species in the Pteridoideae subfamily of the Pteridaceae. It is known by the common name Lydgate's brake and is endemic to Hawaii, where it is known from the islands of Oʻahu, Molokaʻi, and Maui. It was once thought to be extinct until it was rediscovered in the 1990s. There are fewer than 40 individuals in the wild. This is a federally listed endangered species of the United States.
