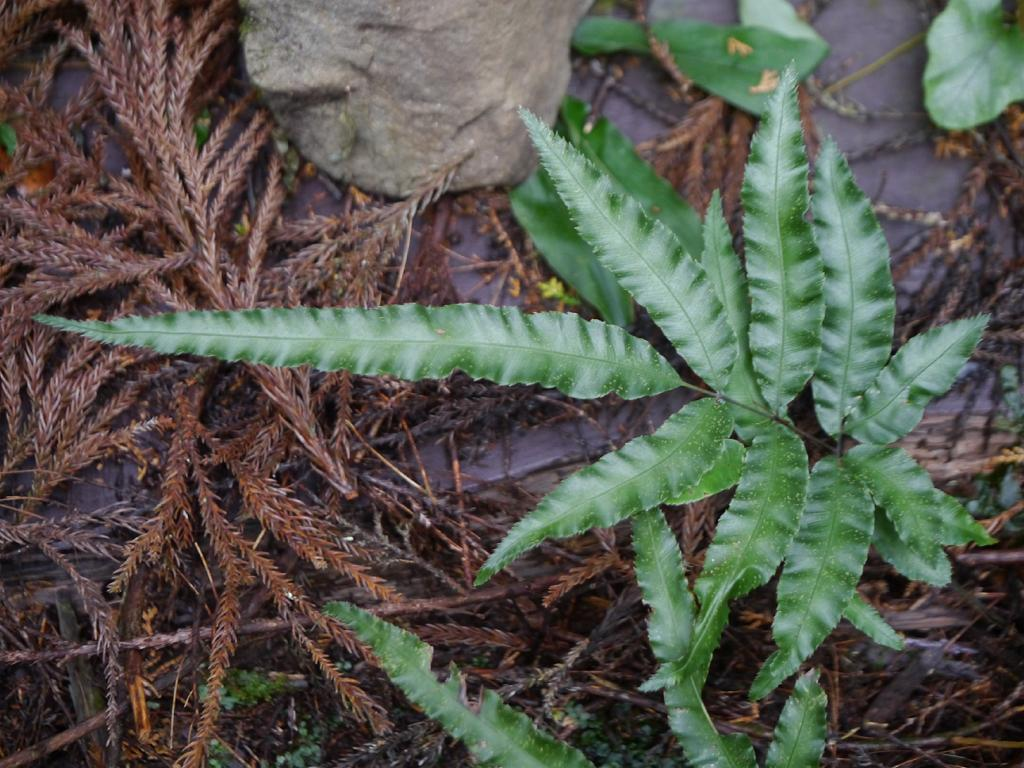

Scientific classification
- Kingdom: Plantae
- Clade: Tracheophytes
- Division: Polypodiophyta
- Class: Polypodiopsida
- Order: Polypodiales
- Family: Pteridaceae
- Genus: Pteris
- Species: P. parkeri

Binomial name
- Pteris parkeri J.J.Parker

Synonyms
- Pteris cretica subsp. nipponica (Shieh) Jotani & Ohba; Pteris cretica var. albolineata auct., non Hooker; Pteris nipponica Shieh

= Pteris parkeri =

Species of fern

Pteris parkeri, the silver ribbon fern, is a species of evergreen fern in the family Pteridaceae, native to Japan, Taiwan and Korea.
