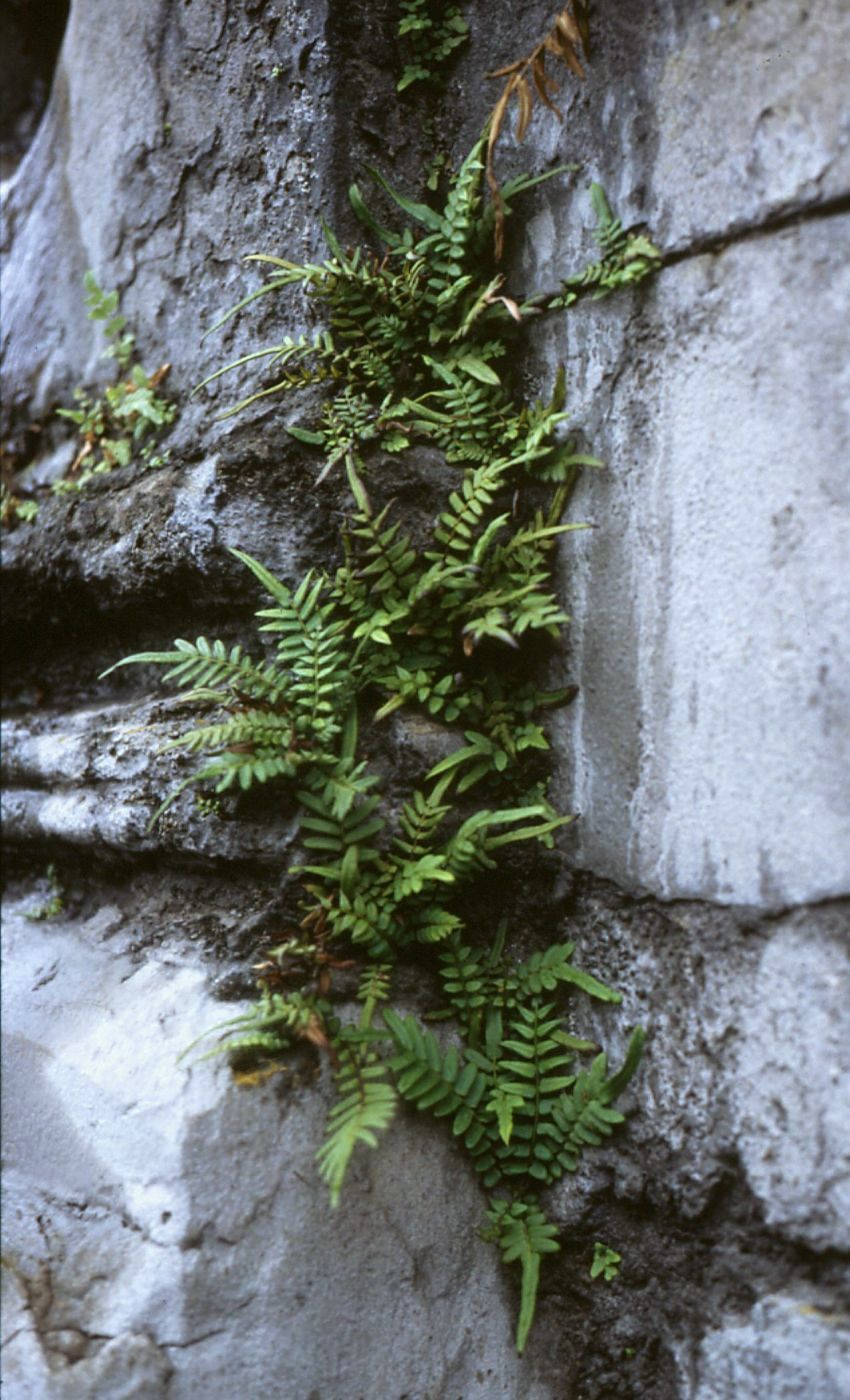

Conservation status
- Least Concern (IUCN 3.1)

Scientific classification
- Kingdom: Plantae
- Clade: Tracheophytes
- Division: Polypodiophyta
- Class: Polypodiopsida
- Order: Polypodiales
- Family: Pteridaceae
- Genus: Pteris
- Species: P. vittata

Binomial name
- Pteris vittata L.

Synonyms
- Pteris costata Bory; P. diversifolia Sw.; P. ensifolia Poir.; P. inaequilateralis Poir.; P. longifolia Wall.; P. microdonata Gaudin; P. vittata fo. cristata Ching in Ching & S.H.Wu; Pycnodoria vittata (L.) Small

= Pteris vittata =

Species of fern

Pteris vittata, the Chinese brake, Chinese ladder brake, or simply ladder brake, is a fern species in the Pteridoideae subfamily of the Pteridaceae. In the Ghanaian Akan dialect, it is called "Ayan". It is indigenous to Asia, southern Europe, tropical Africa (West and South Africa), and Australia. The type specimen was collected in China by Pehr Osbeck.

== Habitat and distribution ==
Pteris vittata is native and widespread in the paleotropics: found from the west(in Ghana; Togo; Cote D'Ivoire; Benin), east, to the south tropical, and southern Africa (in Angola; Kenya; Lesotho; Malawi; Mozambique; Namibia; Tanzania (including the Zanzibar Archipelago); Cape Province, Free State, KwaZulu-Natal, and Transvaal in South Africa; Eswatini; Uganda; Zambia; and Zimbabwe); temperate and tropical Asia (in the provinces of Anhui, Gansu, Guangdong, Guangxi, Guizhou, Hubei, Jiangxi, Sichuan, Xizang, and Yunnan in China; the prefectures of Honshu, Kyushu, Shikoku, and the Ryukyu Islands of Japan; and Thailand); and Australia, in the states of New South Wales, Queensland, Victoria, and Western Australia.

Pteris vittata is often associated with limestone habitats. It may be seen growing on concrete structures and cracks, in buildings in the central business district and suburbs of Sydney. It is an introduced species in California, Texas, and the Southeastern United States.

A remnant population exists in the Italian peninsula, in Sicily, Calabria and Campania.

== Uses ==
Although it grows readily in the wild, Pteris vittata is sometimes cultivated. It is grown in gardens for its attractive appearance, or used in pollution control schemes: it is known to be a hyperaccumulator plant of arsenic used in phytoremediation.

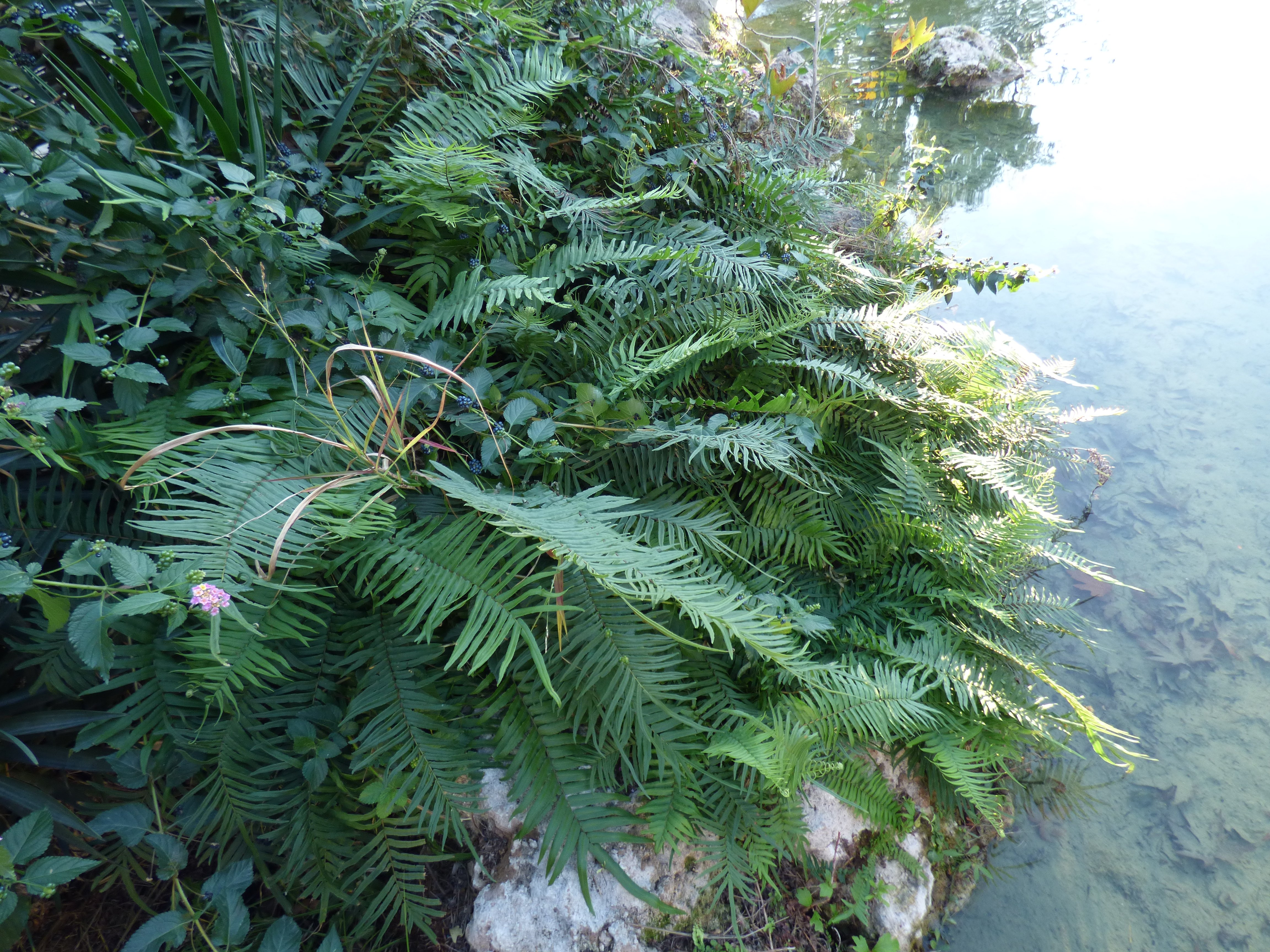
Pteris vittata from Antalya city in Turkey

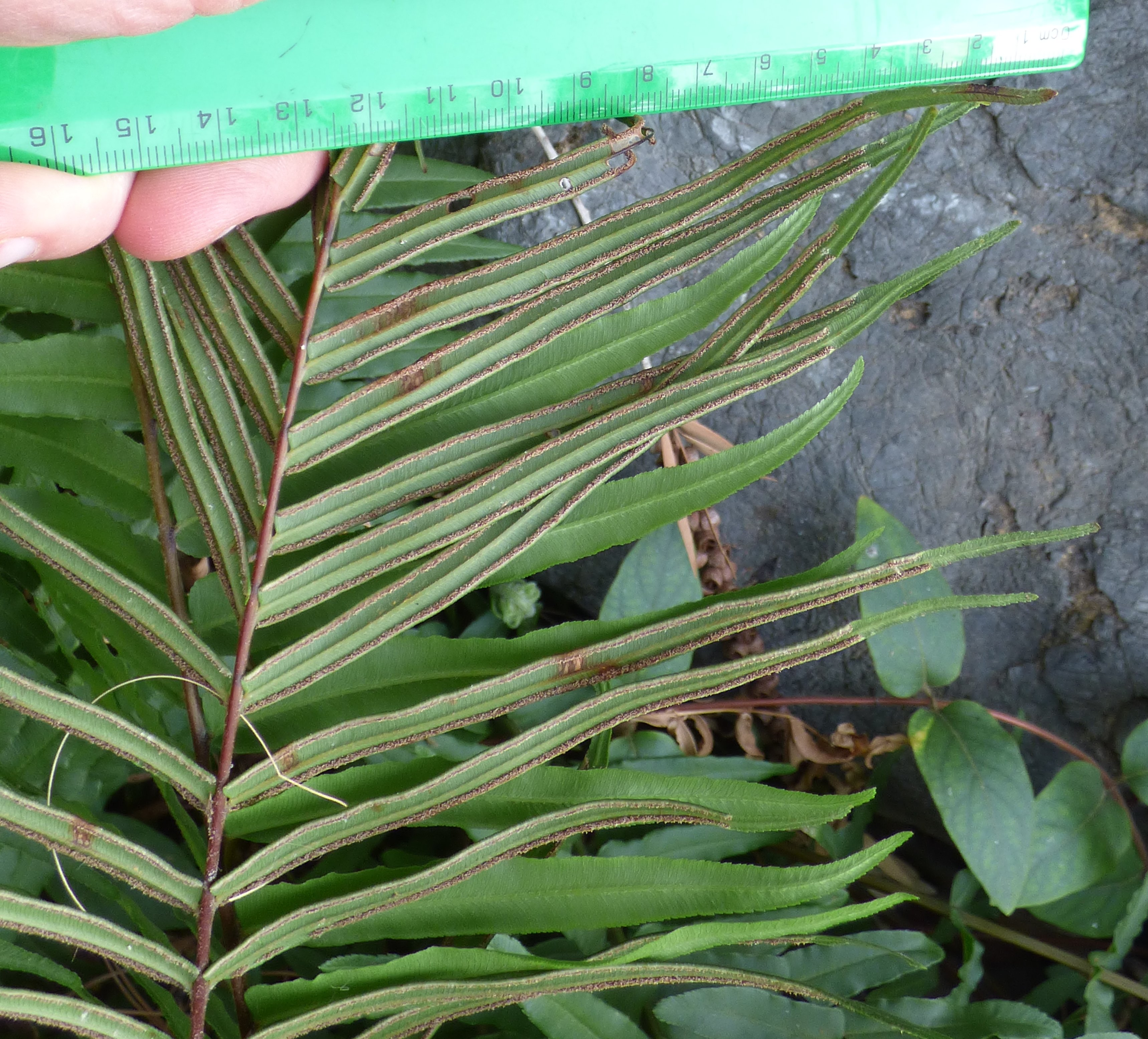
Pinnae undersides of P. vittata from Antalya

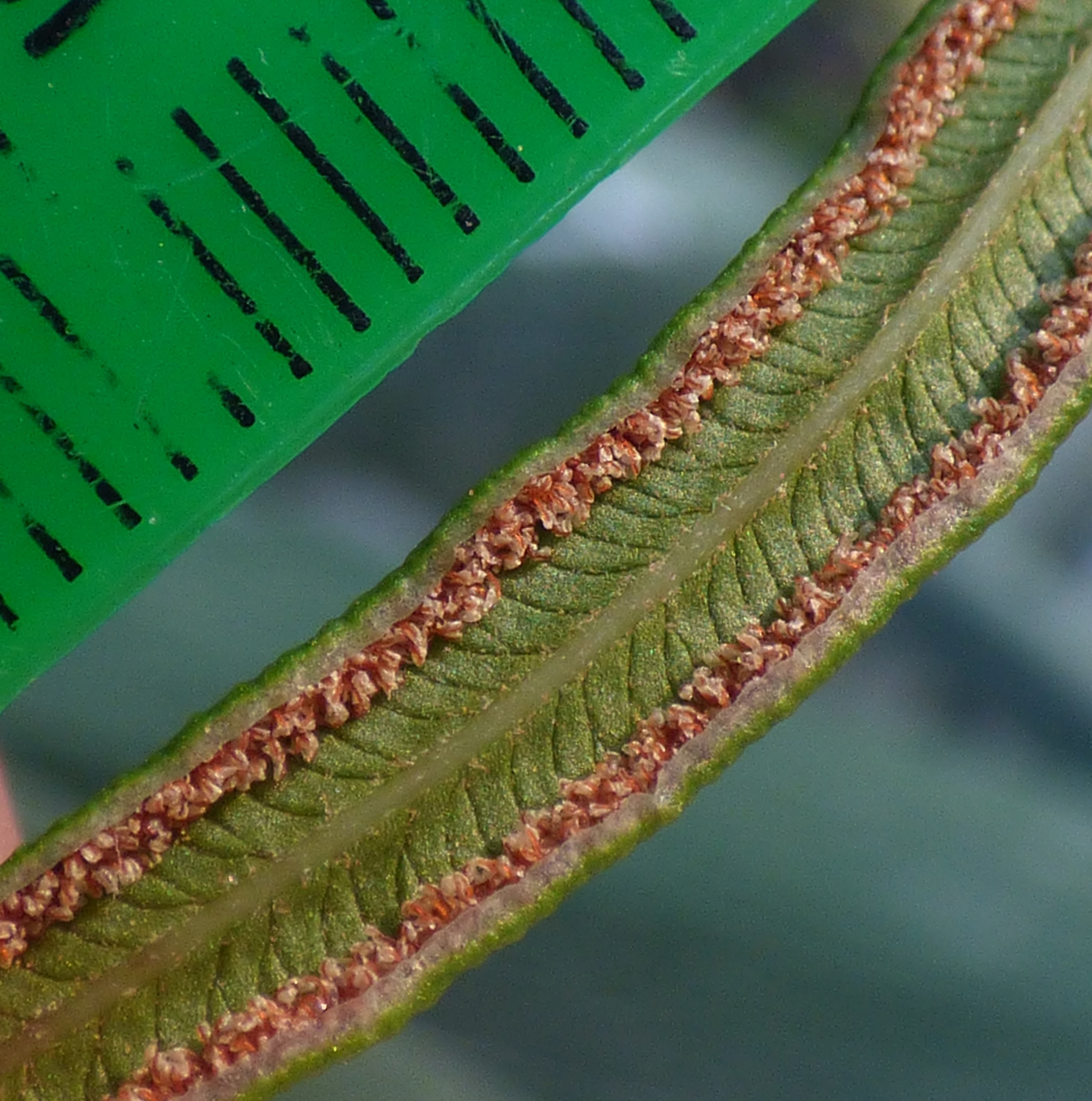
Sori of P. vittata from Antalya

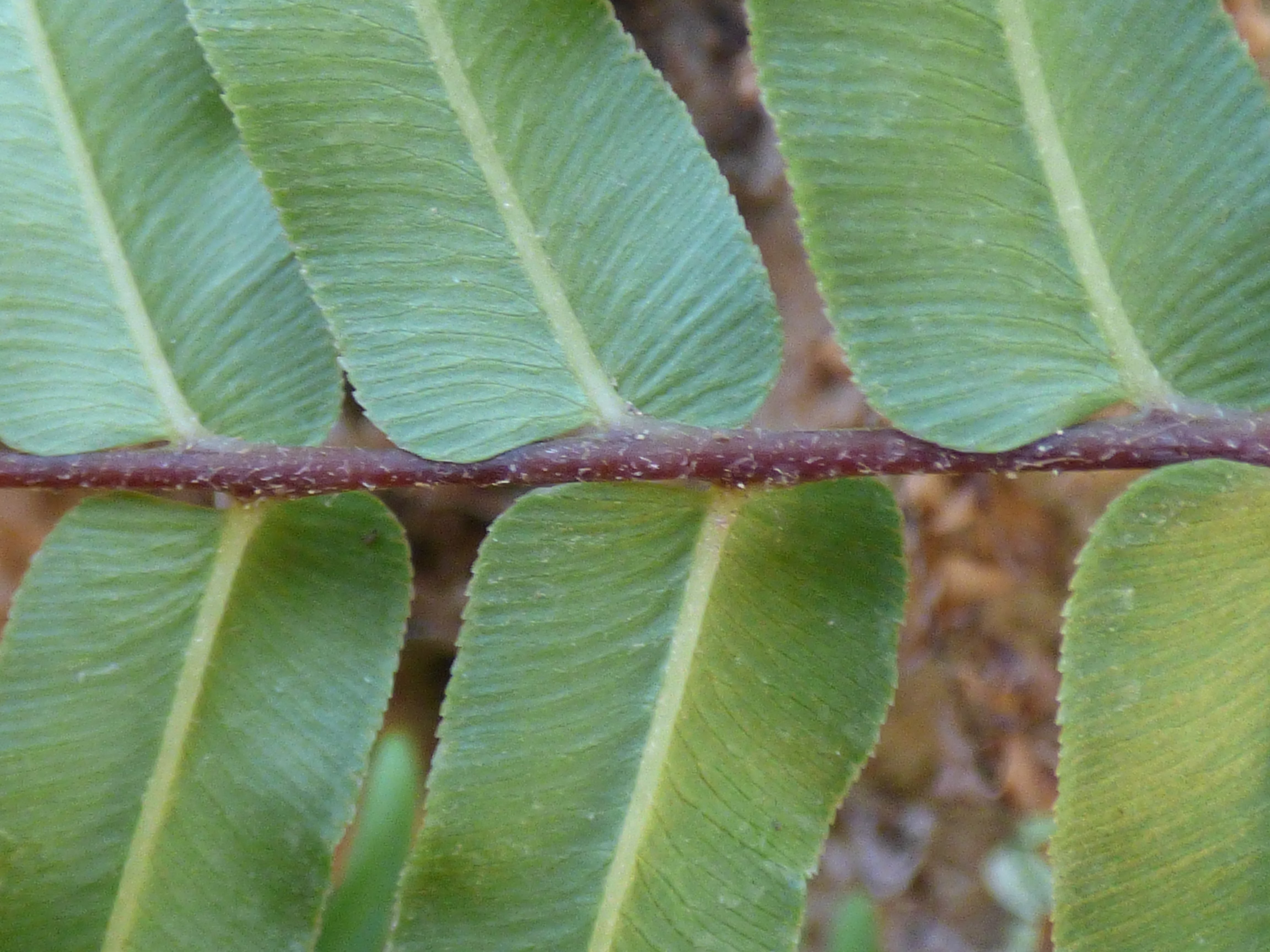
Pinna basal shape (underside) of P. vittata from Antalya

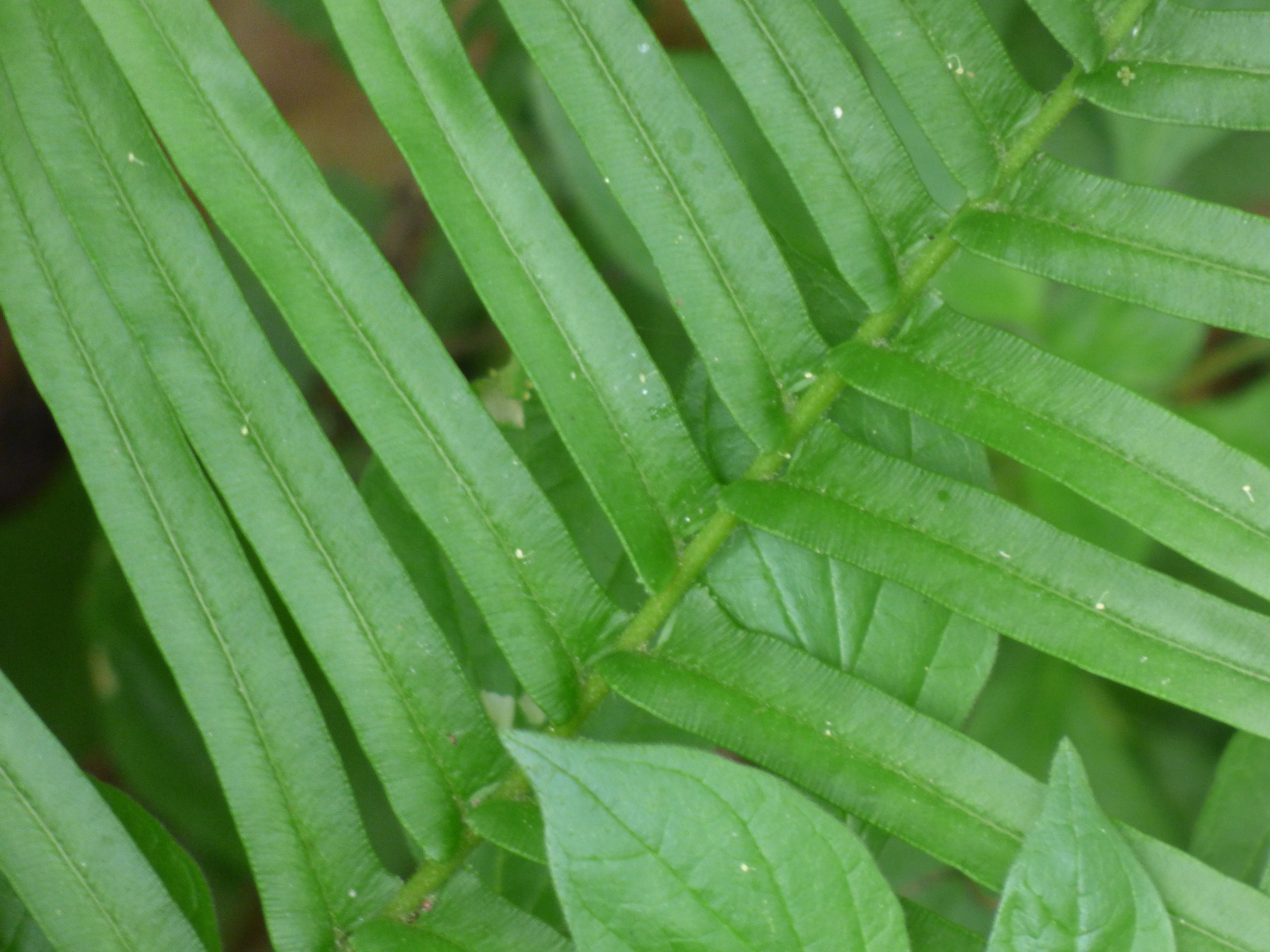
Pinna basal shape (upperside) of P. vittata from Antalya

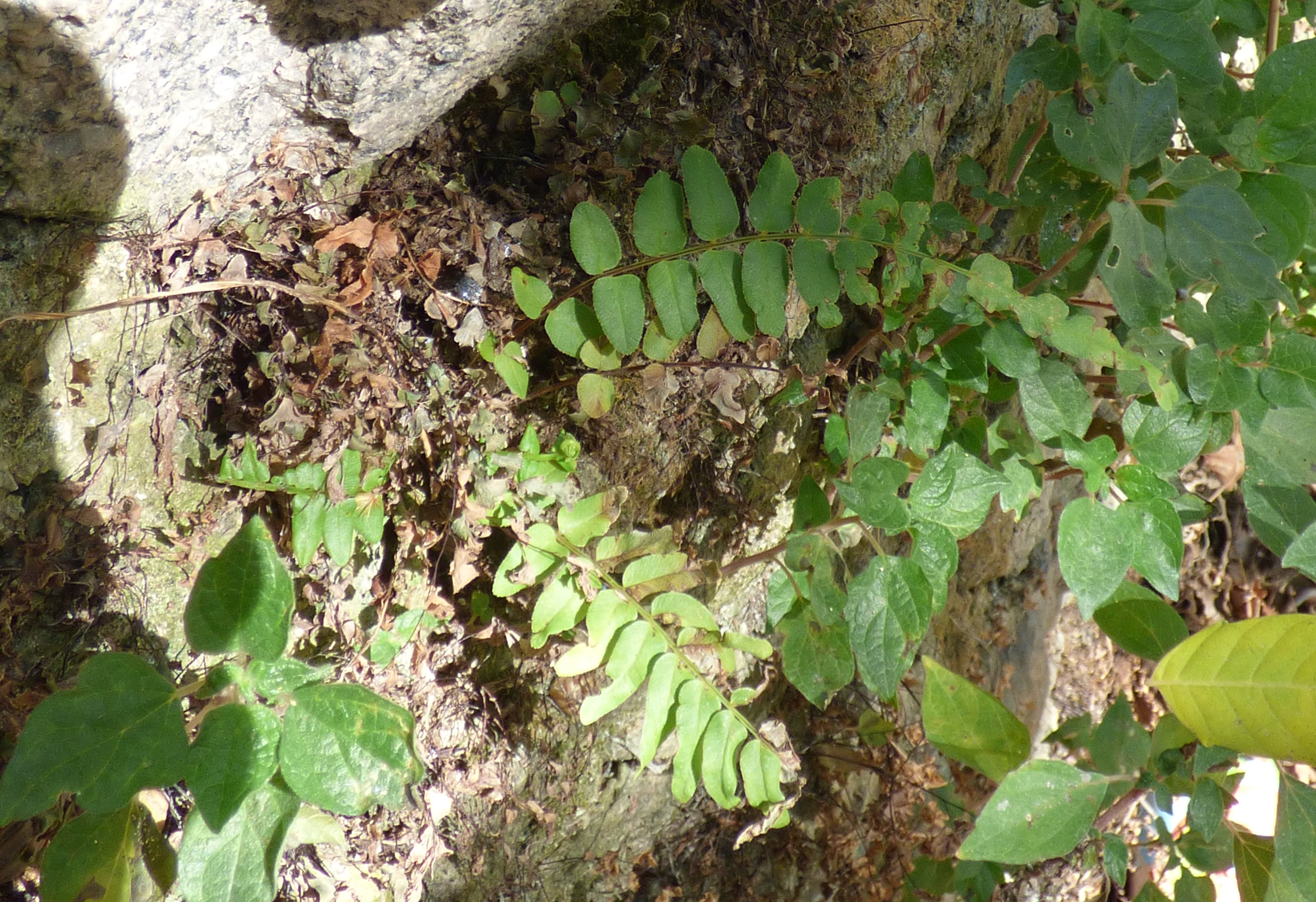
Young P. vittata from Antalya

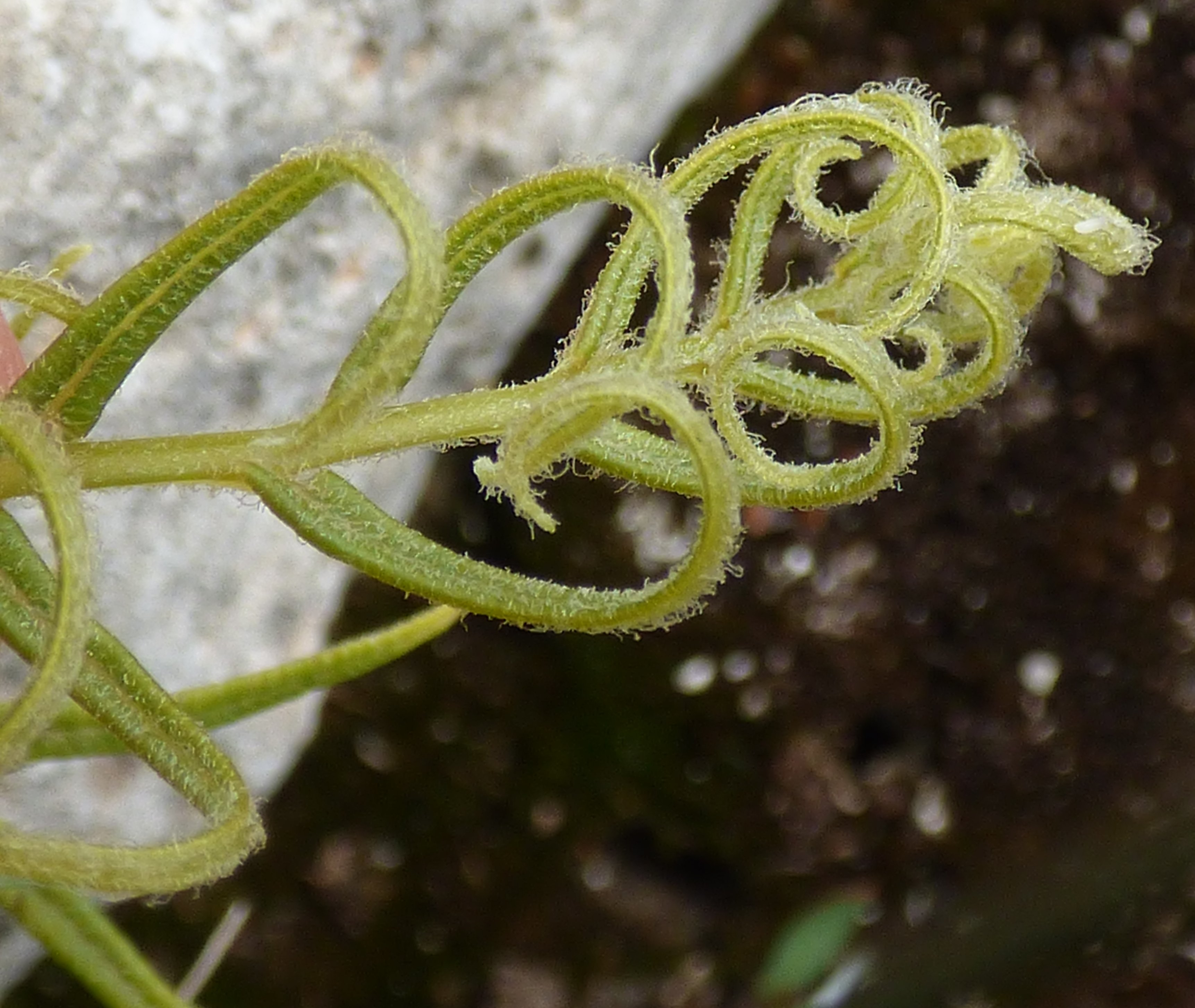
Unfurling frond tip of P. vittata from Antalya

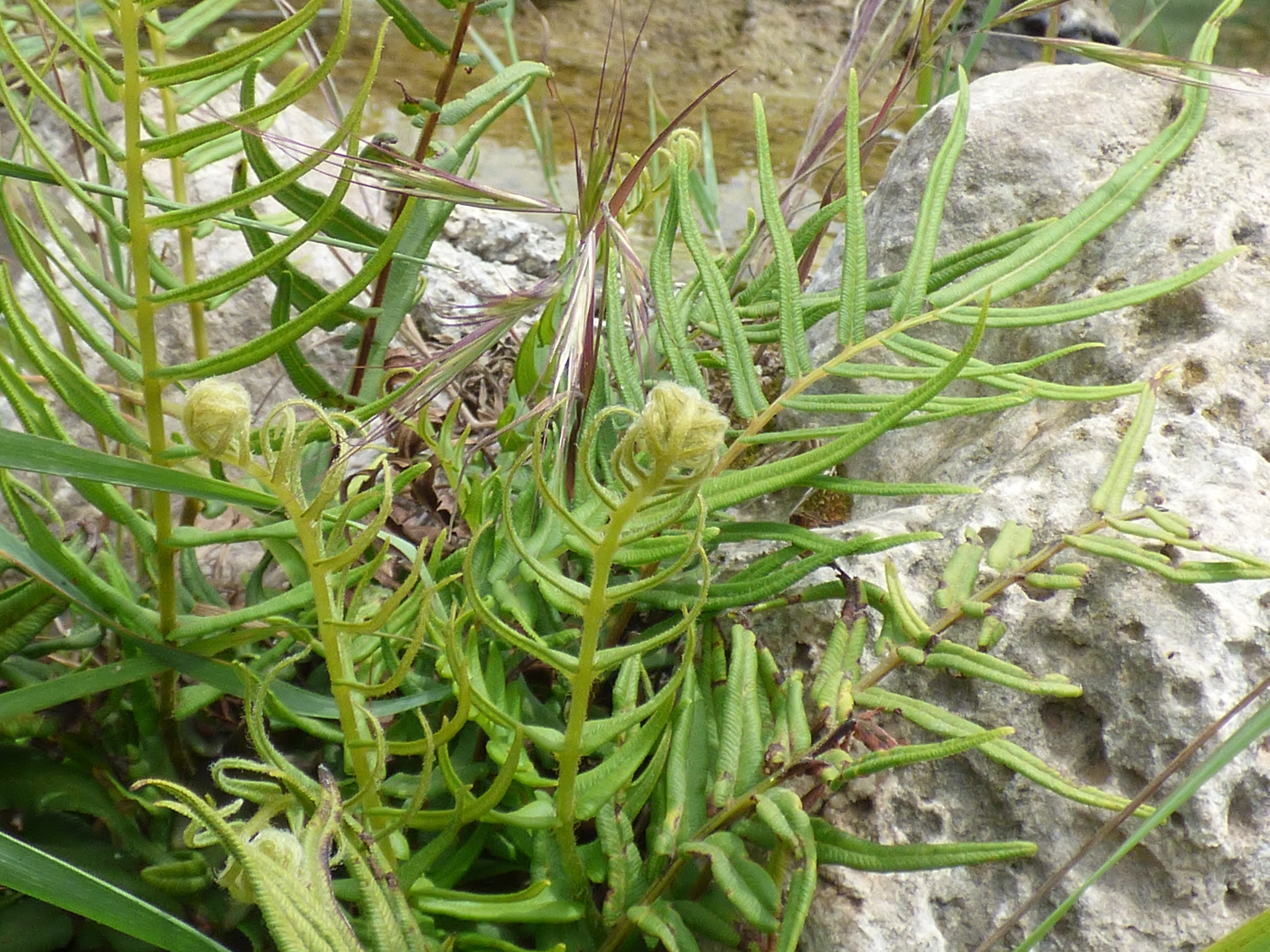
Unfurling fronds of P. vittata from Antalya

== Suggested reading ==
- Cong Tu and Lena Q. Ma; Effects of Arsenic Concentrations and Forms on Arsenic Uptake by the Hyperaccumulator Ladder Brake, Journal of Environmental Quality doi:10.2134/jeq2002.6410 Vol. 31 No. 2, p. 641-647 (résumé)
