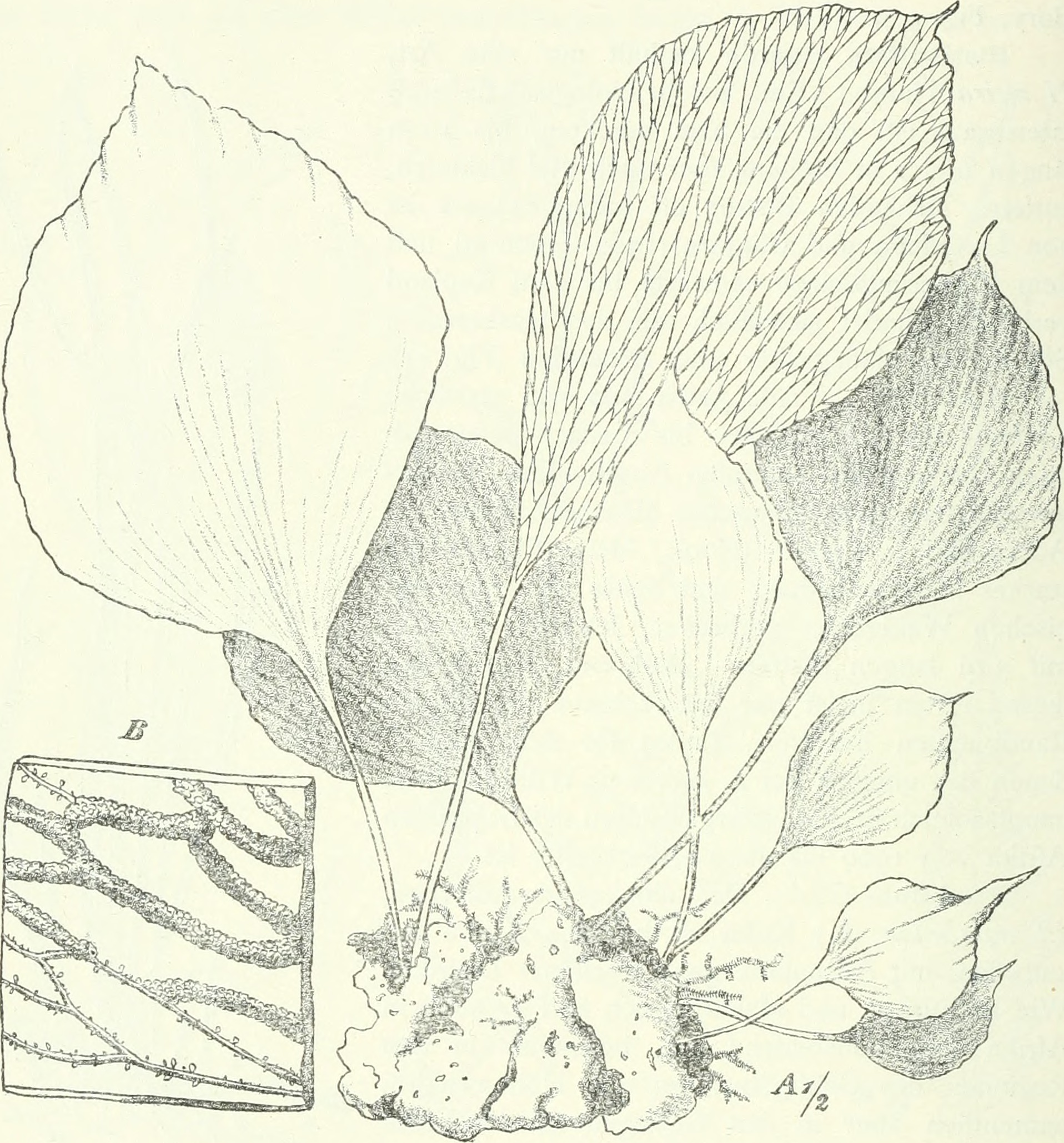
- Drawing of the leaves of Antrophyopsis manniana, with enlargement showing the network of sori beneath

Scientific classification
- Kingdom: Plantae
- Clade: Tracheophytes
- Division: Polypodiophyta
- Class: Polypodiopsida
- Order: Polypodiales
- Family: Pteridaceae
- Genus: Antrophyopsis
- Species: A. manniana

Binomial name
- Antrophyopsis manniana (Hook.) Schuettp.

Synonyms
- Antrophyum mannianum Hook.; Scoliosorus mannianus (Hook.) E.H.Crane

= Antrophyopsis manniana =

Species of fern

Antrophyopsis manniana is a species of the genus Antrophyopsis, a vittarioid fern occurring in the African rain forest and montane forest of East Africa and the Albertine Rift.

== History ==
The type specimen was first collected by Gustav Mann in 1860 on the island of Bioko (Equatorial Guinea), formerly known as Fernando Po, at 3000 ft above sea level. William Jackson Hooker described the species in his book "A second century of ferns" in 1861, placing it in the genus Antrophyum. It was reclassified into the genus Scoliosorus by Edmund H. Crane in 1997, but a molecular phylogeny by Eric Schuettpelz et al. in 2016 found that it belonged to a small group of species sister to the rest of Antrophyum, which was raised to generic level as Antrophyopsis.
