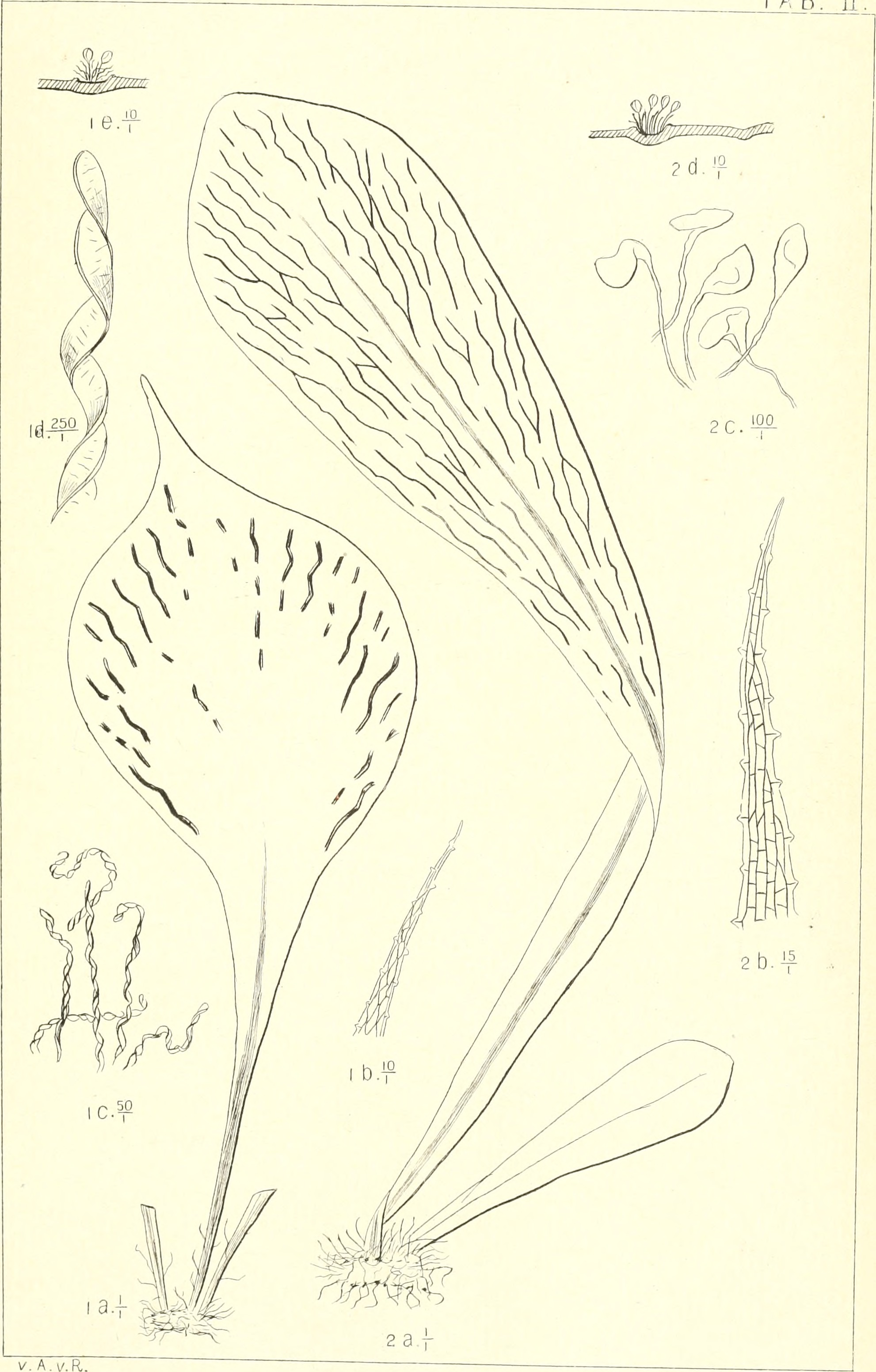

Scientific classification
- Kingdom: Plantae
- Clade: Tracheophytes
- Division: Polypodiophyta
- Class: Polypodiopsida
- Order: Polypodiales
- Family: Pteridaceae
- Subfamily: Vittarioideae
- Genus: Antrophyum; Kaulf. 1824

Type species
- Antrophyum plantagineum (Cav.) Kaulf.

= Antrophyum =

Genus of ferns

Antrophyum is a genus of ferns in the family Pteridaceae. They are commonly known as lineleaf ferns.

== Description ==
Like most other vittarioid ferns, members of the genus have simple, straplike leaves. Most species lack a costa (midrib), although a few have a partial one, and the leaves are generally more than 1 centimetre (0.4 in) wide. The leaves have netlike venation, with three or more rows of areolae ("gaps" in the net of veins) on either side of the midline. Linear sori are borne along the veins throughout the underside of the leaf. Paraphyses (miniature hairs) are present on the sori (separating the genus from Polytaenium); the cells at the tips of the paraphyses may be spherical or slender, and spores are trilete. (By comparison, Scoliosorus and Antrophyopsis always have spherical cells at the tips of their paraphyses, and monolete spores.)

== Taxonomy ==
The genus was first described by Georg Friedrich Kaulfuss in 1824. He included in it several species placed in Hemionitis by Carl Ludwig Willdenow, distinguishing them on the basis of their reticulate, indusiate sori sunken into the leaf tissue. The name means "growing from a cavity", a reference to the growth of the sori from a groove in the leaf. In 1875, John Smith designated Antrophyum plantagineum as the lectotype for the genus. Species include:

Phylogeny of Antrophyum

- - A. novae-caledoniae Hieron.
  - - - - A. parvulum Bl.
        - A. plantagineum (Cav.) Kaulf.
      - - A. crassifolium Chen
        - - - A. brassii S.Linds.
            - - A. megistophyllum Copel.
              - A. strictum Mett.
          - - - A. lancifolium Rosenst.
              - A. subfalcatum Brackenr.
            - - A. ledermannii Hier.
              - - A. smithii C. Chr.
                - - A. tahitense Chen & Nitta 2023
                  - - A. austroqueenslandicum D. L. Jones
                    - A. solomonense Chen & Nitta 2015
    - - - A. pseudolatifolium Chen 2023
        - - A. castaneum H.Itô
          - A. obovatum Bak.
      - - A. semicostatum Bl.
        - - - A. hovenkampii Chen
            - - A. annamense Tardieu & C.Chr.
              - - A. henryi Hieron.
                - A. nambanense Chen 2020
          - - A. formosanum Hieron.
            - - A. sessilifolium (Cav.) Spreng.
              - - A. malgassicum C. Chr.
                - - A. vittarioides Bak.
                  - - A. callifolium Blume (Ox-tongue Fern)
                    - A. reticulatum (Forst.) Kaulf.

Other species include:

- A. annetii (Jeanp.) Tardieu
- A. brookei Hook.
- A. costatum Alderw.
- A. jagoanum D.L.Jones & Bostock
- A. kinabaluense Chen 2023
- A. lancifolium Blume
- A. obovatum Baker
- A. ovatum Alderw.
- A. simulans Alderw.
- A. trivittatum C. Chr.
- A. williamsii Benedict

The subgenus Antrophyopsis, containing the species A. bivittatum C. Chr., A. boryanum Willd., and A. mannianum Hook. (later treated in Scoliosorus), was elevated to a genus in 2016.

== Distribution ==
Most species occur in tropical Asia and the Pacific, but A. immersum and A. malgassicum are known from Africa and the Indian Ocean.
