= Swamp =

Forested wetland

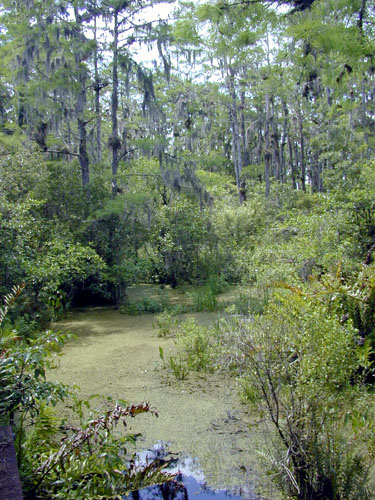
A freshwater swamp in Florida, United States

A swamp is a forested wetland. Swamps are considered to be transition zones because both land and water play a role in creating this environment. Swamps vary in size and are located all around the world. The water of a swamp may be fresh water, brackish water, or seawater. Freshwater swamps form along large rivers or lakes where they are critically dependent upon rainwater and seasonal flooding to maintain natural water level fluctuations. Saltwater swamps are found along tropical and subtropical coastlines. Some swamps have hammocks, or dry-land protrusions, covered by aquatic vegetation, or vegetation that tolerates periodic inundation or soil saturation. The two main types of swamp are "true" or swamp forests and "transitional" or shrub swamps. In the boreal regions of Canada, the word swamp is colloquially used for what is more formally termed a bog, fen, or muskeg. Some of the world's largest swamps are found along major rivers such as the Amazon, the Mississippi, and the Congo.

== Differences between marshes and swamps ==
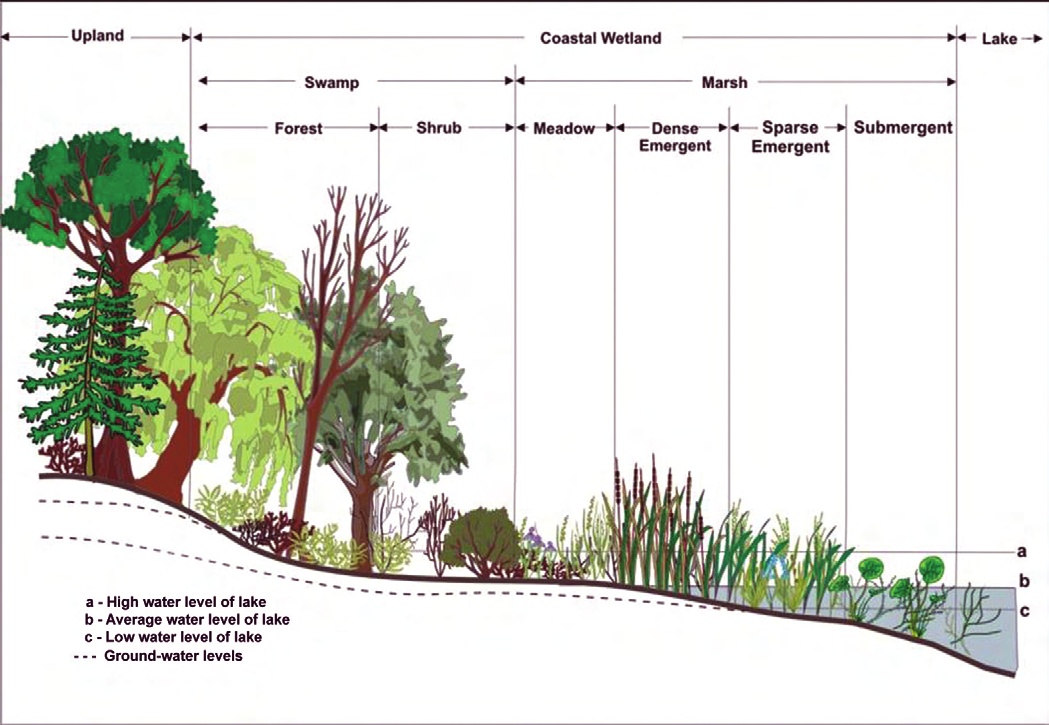
Infographic demonstrating transition between swamp and marsh, among the nomenclature of other portions of a costal wetland environment

Swamps and marshes are specific types of wetlands that form along waterbodies containing rich, hydric soils. Marshes are wetlands, continually or frequently flooded by nearby running bodies of water, that are dominated by emergent soft-stem vegetation and herbaceous plants. Swamps are wetlands consisting of saturated soils or standing water and are dominated by water-tolerant woody vegetation such as shrubs, bushes, and trees.

== Hydrology ==
Swamps are characterized by their saturated soils and slow-moving waters. The water that accumulates in swamps comes from a variety of sources including precipitation, groundwater, tides and freshwater flooding. These hydrologic pathways all contribute to how energy and nutrients flow in and out of the ecosystem. As water flows through the swamp, nutrients, sediment and pollutants are naturally filtered out. Chemicals like phosphorus and nitrogen that end up in waterways get absorbed and used by the aquatic plants within the swamp, purifying the water. Any remaining or excess chemicals present will accumulate at the bottom of the swamp, being removed from the water and buried within the sediment. The hydrology of a swamp is a key factor in its biogeochemical environment, which includes the levels and availability of resources like oxygen, nutrients, pH, and toxicity.

== Values and ecosystem services ==
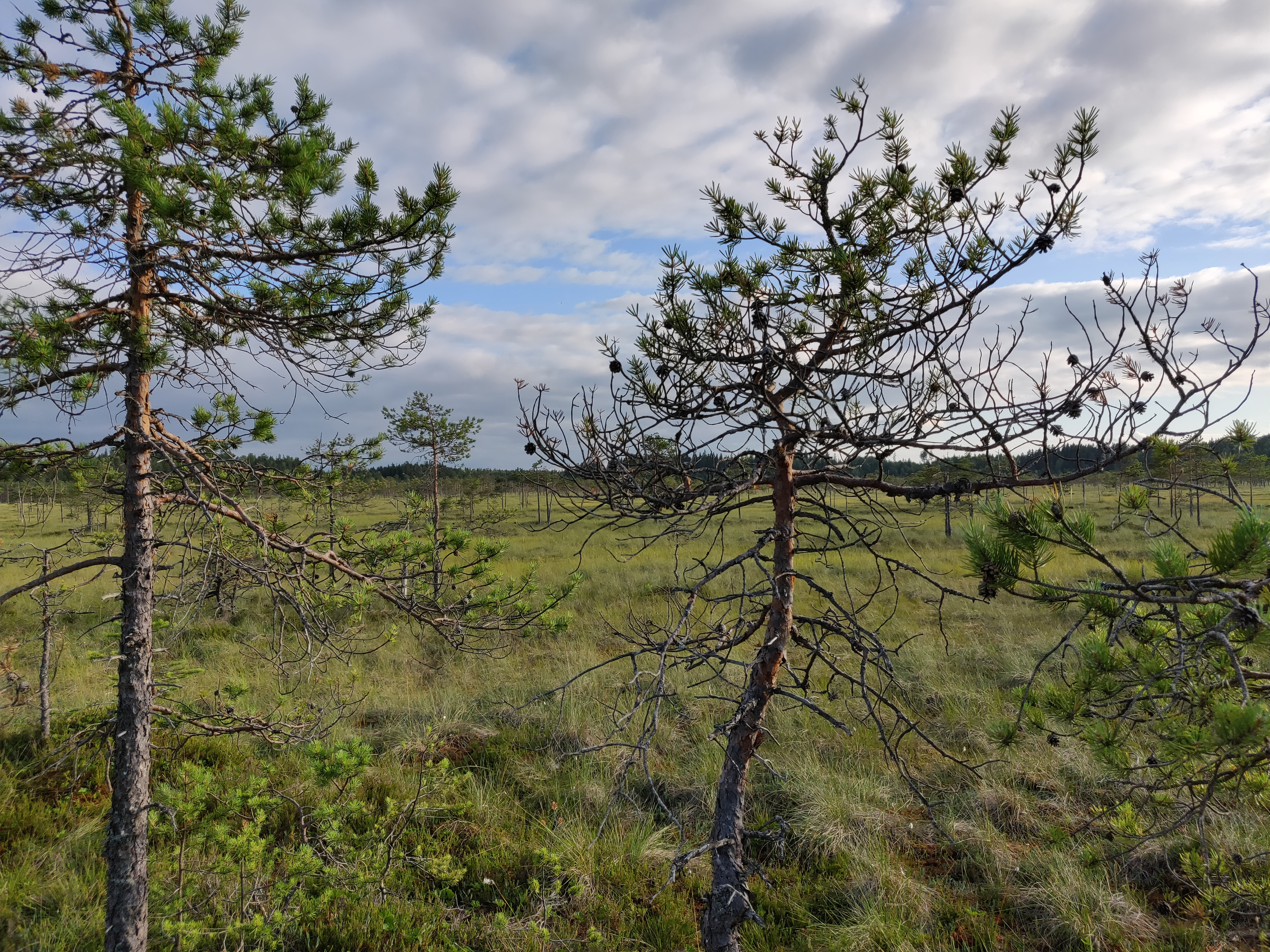
The Linnaistensuo Mire, a nature reserve swamp in Lahti, Finland.

Swamps play a beneficial ecological role in the overall functions of the natural environment and provide a variety of resources that many species depend on. Swamps and other wetlands have shown to be a natural form of flood management and defense against flooding. In such circumstances where flooding does occur, swamps absorb and use the excess water within the wetland, preventing it from traveling and flooding surrounding areas. Dense vegetation within the swamp also provides soil stability to the land, holding soils and sediment in place whilst preventing erosion and land loss. Swamps are an abundant and valuable source of fresh water and oxygen for all life, and they are often breeding grounds for a wide variety of species.

=== Human uses ===
Swamps and other wetlands have traditionally held a very low property value compared to fields, prairies, or woodlands. They have a reputation for being unproductive land that cannot easily be used for human activities, other than hunting, trapping, or fishing. Farmers, for example, typically drained swamps next to their fields so as to gain more land usable for planting crops, both historically, and to a lesser extent, recently.

On the other hand, floodplain swamps are an important resource in the production and distribution of fish. Two thirds of global fish and shellfish are commercially harvested and dependent on wetlands.

== Impacts and conservation ==
Historically, humans have been known to drain or fill swamps and other wetlands in order to create more space for human development and to reduce the threat of diseases borne by swamp insects. Wetlands are removed and replaced with land that is then used for things like agriculture, real estate, and recreational uses. Many swamps have also undergone intensive logging and farming, requiring the construction of drainage ditches and canals. These ditches and canals contributed to drainage and, along the coast, allowed salt water to intrude, converting swamps to marsh or even to open water. Large areas of swamp were therefore lost or degraded. Louisiana provides a classic example of wetland loss from these combined factors. Europe has likely lost nearly half its wetlands. New Zealand lost 90 percent of its wetlands over a period of 150 years. Ecologists recognize that swamps provide ecological services including flood control, fish production, water purification, carbon storage, and wildlife habitats. In many parts of the world authorities protect swamps. In parts of Europe and North America, swamp restoration projects are becoming widespread. The United States government began enforcing stricter laws and management programs in the 1970s in efforts to protect and restore these ecosystems. Often the simplest steps to restoring swamps involve plugging drainage ditches and removing levees.

Conservationists work to preserve swamps such as those in northwest Indiana in the United States Midwest that were preserved as part of the Indiana Dunes.

== Notable examples ==
Swamps can be found on all continents except Antarctica.

The largest swamp in the world is the Amazon River floodplain, which is particularly significant for its large number of fish and tree species.

=== Africa ===
The Sudd and the Okavango Delta are Africa's best known marshland areas. The Bangweulu Floodplains make up Africa's largest swamp.

=== Asia ===
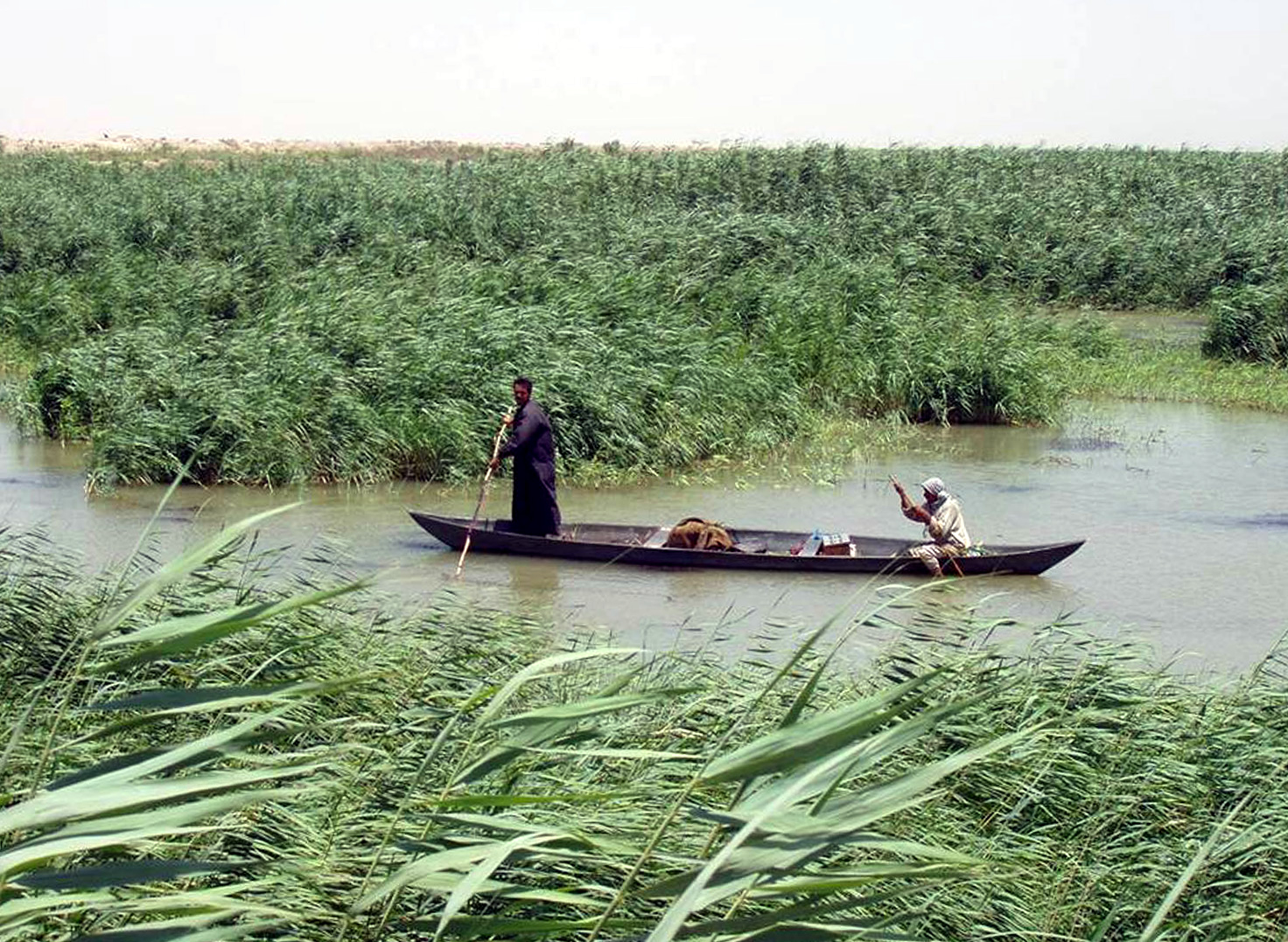
Marsh Arabs poling a mashoof

The Mesopotamian Marshes is a large swamp and river system in southern Iraq, traditionally inhabited in part by the Marsh Arabs.

In Asia, tropical peat swamps are located in mainland East Asia and Southeast Asia. In Southeast Asia, peatlands are mainly found in low altitude coastal and sub-coastal areas and extend inland for distance more than 100 km (60 mi) along river valleys and across watersheds. They are mostly to be found on the coasts of East Sumatra, Kalimantan (Central, East, South and West Kalimantan provinces), West Papua, Papua New Guinea, Brunei, Peninsular Malaya, Sabah, Sarawak, Southeast Thailand, and the Philippines (Riley et al.,1996). Indonesia has the largest area of tropical peatland. Of the total 440,000 km^{2} (170,000 sq mi) tropical peat swamp, about 210,000 km^{2} (81,000 sq mi) are located in Indonesia (Page, 2001; Wahyunto, 2006).

The Vasyugan Swamp is a large swamp in the western Siberia area of the Russian Federation, which is one of the largest swamps in the world, covering an area larger than Switzerland.

=== North America ===
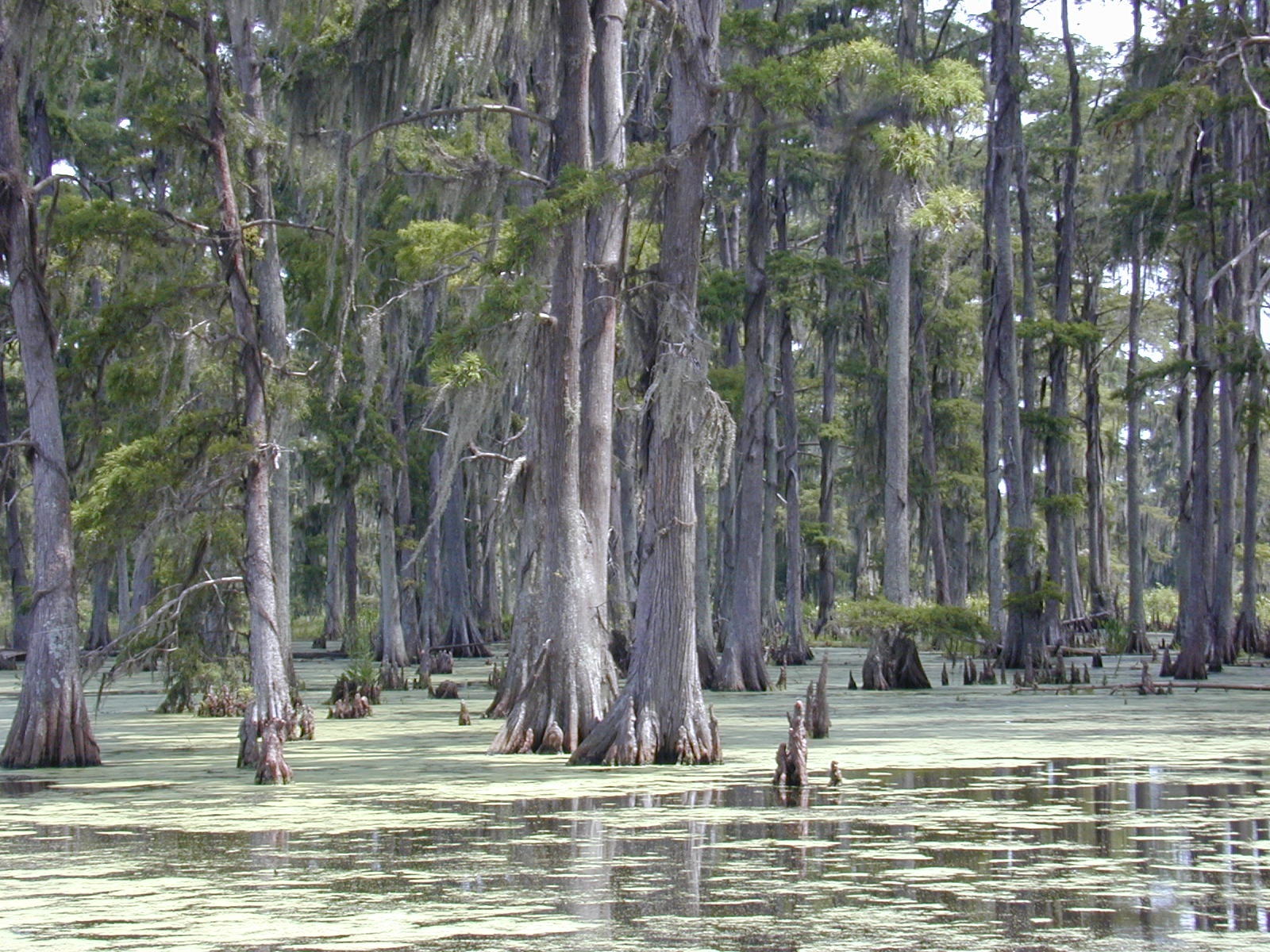
Swamp in southern Louisiana with bald cypress trees

The Atchafalaya Swamp at the lower end of the Mississippi River is the largest swamp in the United States. It is an important example of the southern cypress swamp but it has been greatly altered by logging, drainage, and levee construction. Other famous swamps in the United States are the forested portions of the Everglades, Okefenokee Swamp, Barley Barber Swamp, Great Cypress Swamp and the Great Dismal Swamp. The Okefenokee is located in extreme southeastern Georgia and extends slightly into northeastern Florida. The Great Cypress Swamp is mostly in Delaware, but extends into Maryland on the Delmarva Peninsula. Point Lookout State Park on the southern tip of Maryland contains many swamps and marshes. The Great Dismal Swamp lies in extreme southeastern Virginia and extreme northeastern North Carolina. Both are National Wildlife Refuges. Another swamp area, Reelfoot Lake of extreme western Tennessee and Kentucky, was created by the 1811–12 New Madrid earthquakes. Caddo Lake, the Great Dismal and Reelfoot are swamps centered at large lakes. Swamps are often associated with bayous in the southeastern United States, especially in the Gulf Coast region. A baygall is a type of swamp found in the forest of the Gulf Coast states in the US.

== List of major swamps ==
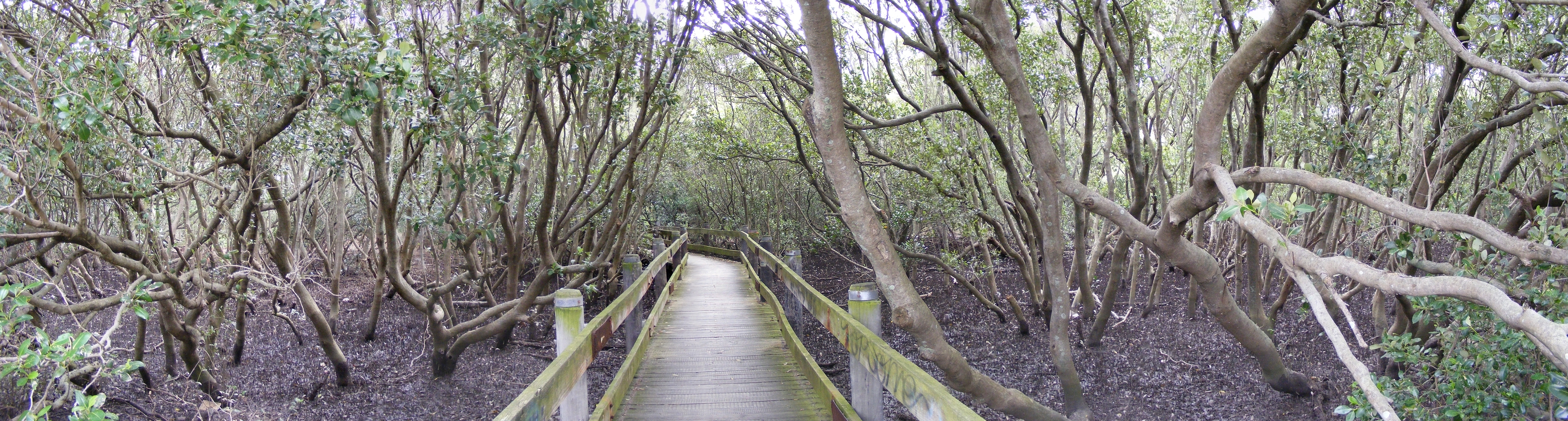
A small swamp in Padstow, New South Wales, Australia, with a wooden boardwalk to allow access for walking and hiking

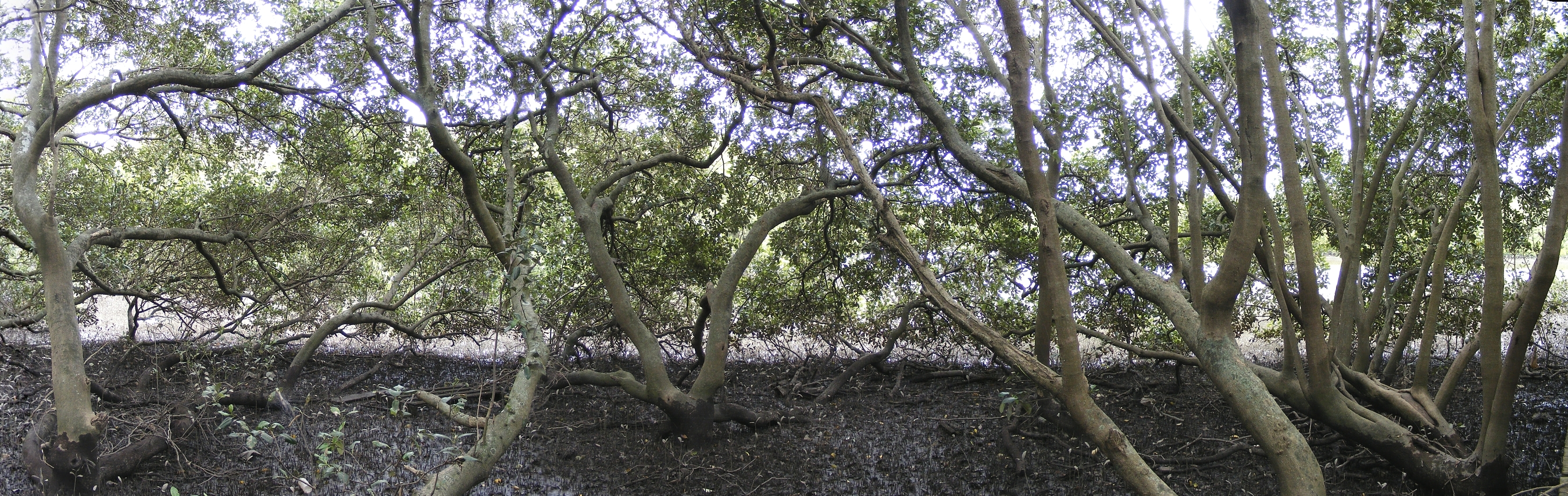
Inside a mangrove canopy, Salt Pan Creek, New South Wales

The world's largest wetlands include significant areas of swamp, such as in the Amazon and Congo River basins. Further north, however, the largest wetlands are bogs.

=== Africa ===
- Bangweulu Swamps, Zambia
- Mare aux Songes, Mauritius*
- Niger Delta, Nigeria
- Okavango Swamp, Botswana
- Sudd, South Sudan

=== Asia ===
- Asmat Swamp, Indonesia
- Candaba Swamp in Apalit and Candaba, Pampanga and Pulilan, Bulacan, Philippines
- Mangrove Swamp in Karachi, Pakistan
- Myristica Swamp in Western Ghats, India
- Ratargul Swamp Forest in Sylhet, Bangladesh
- Sundarbans in India and Bangladesh
- Vasyugan Swamp, Russia
- Negombo Swamp, Sri Lanka

=== Australia ===
- Banksia Swamp, Victoria, Australia
- Becher Point Wetlands, Western Australia
- Burraga Swamp, New South Wales, Australia
- Coomonderry Swamp
- Coastal Swamp Oak Forest, Queensland/New South Wales, Australia
- Coastal Upland Swamps, New South Wales, Australia
- Cumbung Swamp, New South Wales, Australia
- Fivebough and Tuckerbil Swamps, New South Wales, Australia
- Koo-Wee-Rup Swamp, Victoria, Australia
- Noosa Everglades, Queensland, Australia
- Toolibin Lake, Western Australia
- West Melbourne Swamp, Victoria, Australia

=== Europe ===
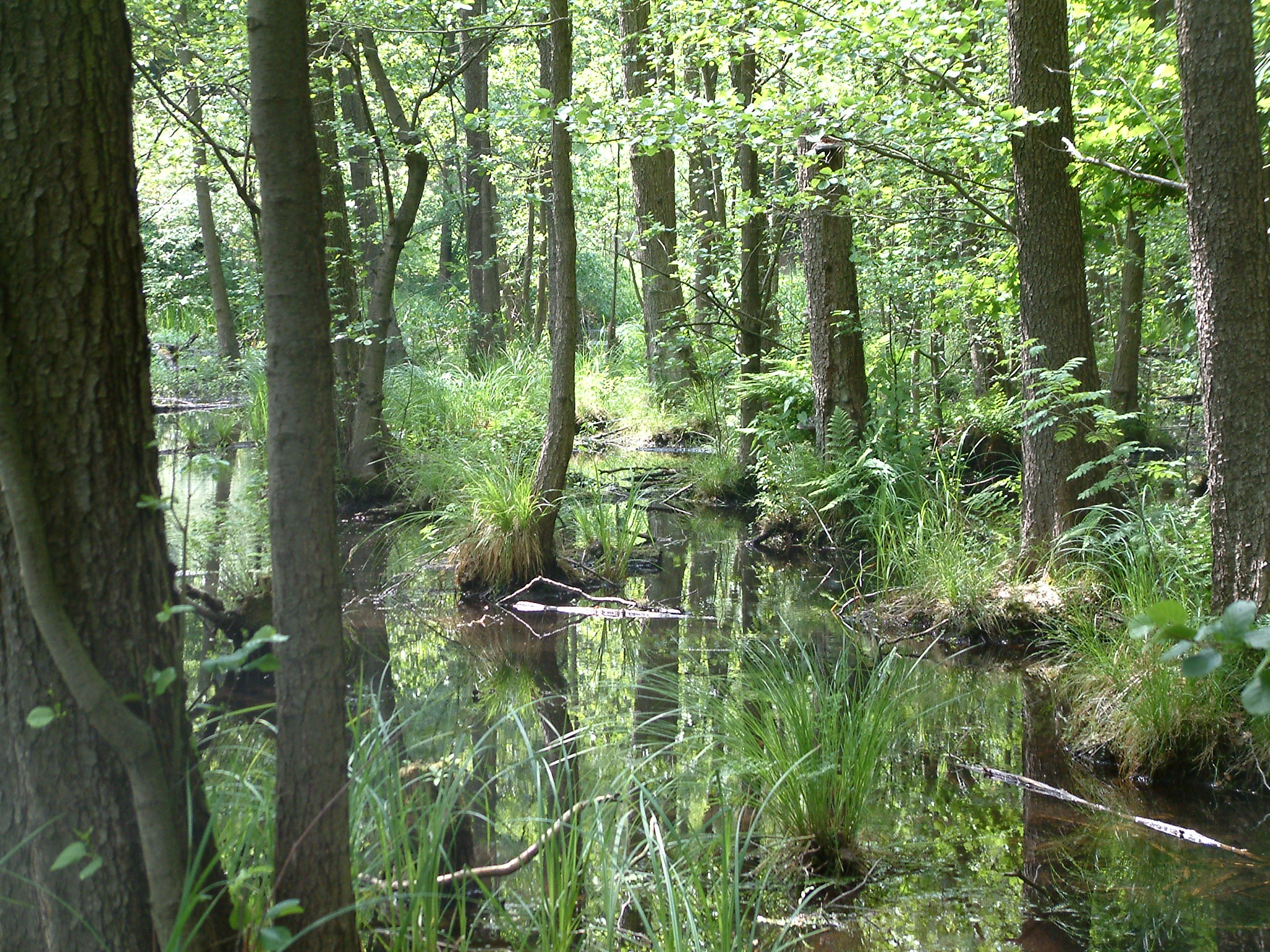
A black alder swamp in Germany

- Pripyat Marshes, Belarus
- Šúr, Slovakia
- Kopački rit, Croatia

=== North America ===
- Atchafalaya National Wildlife Refuge, Louisiana, United States
- Big Cypress National Preserve, Florida, United States
- Barley Barber Swamp, Florida, United States
- Cache River, Illinois, United States
- Caddo Lake, Texas/Louisiana, United States
- Cibuco Swamp, Puerto Rico
- Congaree Swamp, South Carolina, United States
- Everglades, Florida, United States
- First Landing State Park, Virginia, United States
- Grand Kankakee Marsh, Indiana, United States
- Great Black Swamp, Indiana/Ohio, United States
- Great Cypress Swamp, Delaware and Maryland, United States, also known as Great Pocomoke Swamp
- Great Dismal Swamp, North Carolina/Virginia, United States
- Great Swamp National Wildlife Refuge, New Jersey, United States
- Green Swamp, Florida, United States
- Green Swamp, North Carolina, United States
- Honey Island Swamp, Louisiana, United States
- Hudson Bay Lowlands, Ontario, Canada
- Limberlost, Indiana, United States
- Louisiana swamplands, Louisiana, United States
- Mingo National Wildlife Refuge, Puxico, Missouri, United States
- Mobile-Tensaw River Delta, Alabama, United States
- Okefenokee Swamp, Georgia/Florida, United States
- Pantanos de Centla, Tabasco/Campeche, Mexico
- Reelfoot Lake, Tennessee, United States
- Texas Swamplands, Texas, United States
- Tortuguero National Park, Limón, Costa Rica

=== South America ===
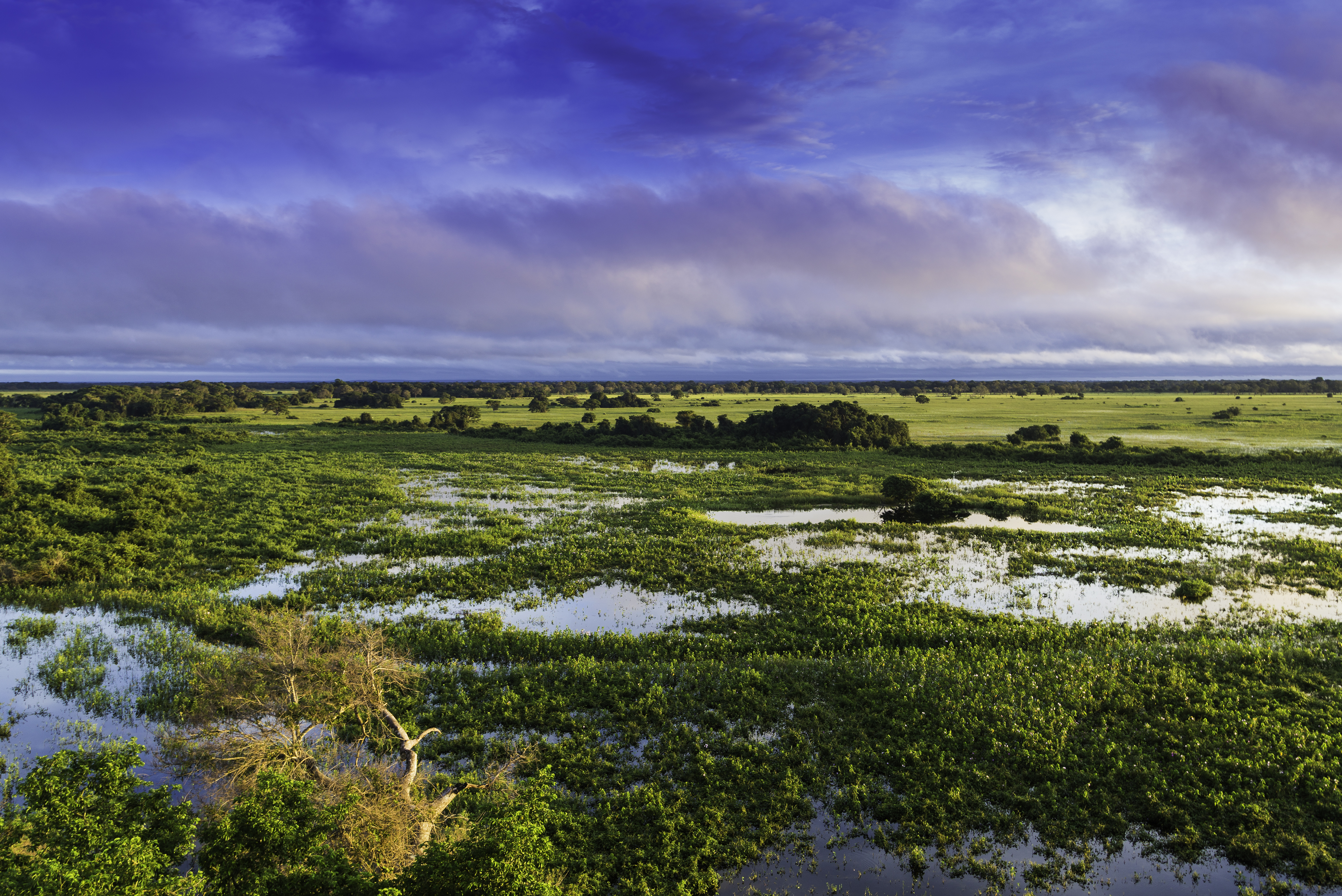
Pantanal in Brazil

- Caribbean Lowlands, Colombia
- Esteros del Iberá, Argentina
- Lahuen Ñadi, Chile
- Pantanal, Brazil, Bolivia and Paraguay
- Paraná Delta, Argentina

== See also ==
- Aquatic plant – Plant that has adapted to living in an aquatic environment
- Bayou – Body of water in flat, low-lying areas
- Bog – Type of wetland with peat-rich soil
- Coniferous swamp – Forested wetlands dominated by conifers
- Fen – Type of wetland fed by mineral-rich ground or surface water
- Freshwater swamp forest – Forest growing on an alluvial zone
- Hydrogen sulfide – Poisonous and flammable gas
- Marsh – Low-lying and seasonally waterlogged land
- Marsh gas – Gas produced naturally within marshes, swamps and bogs
- Muck – Soil type
- Peat – Accumulation of partially decayed vegetation
- Peat swamp forest – Forests with waterlogged soil preventing decomposition
- Salt marsh – Coastal ecosystem between land and open saltwater that is regularly flooded
- Shrub swamp – Type of wetland ecosystem
- Slough (hydrology) – Type of wetland
- Wetland – Ecosystem that is flooded or saturated with water
- Will-o'-the-wisp – Atmospheric ghost lights
