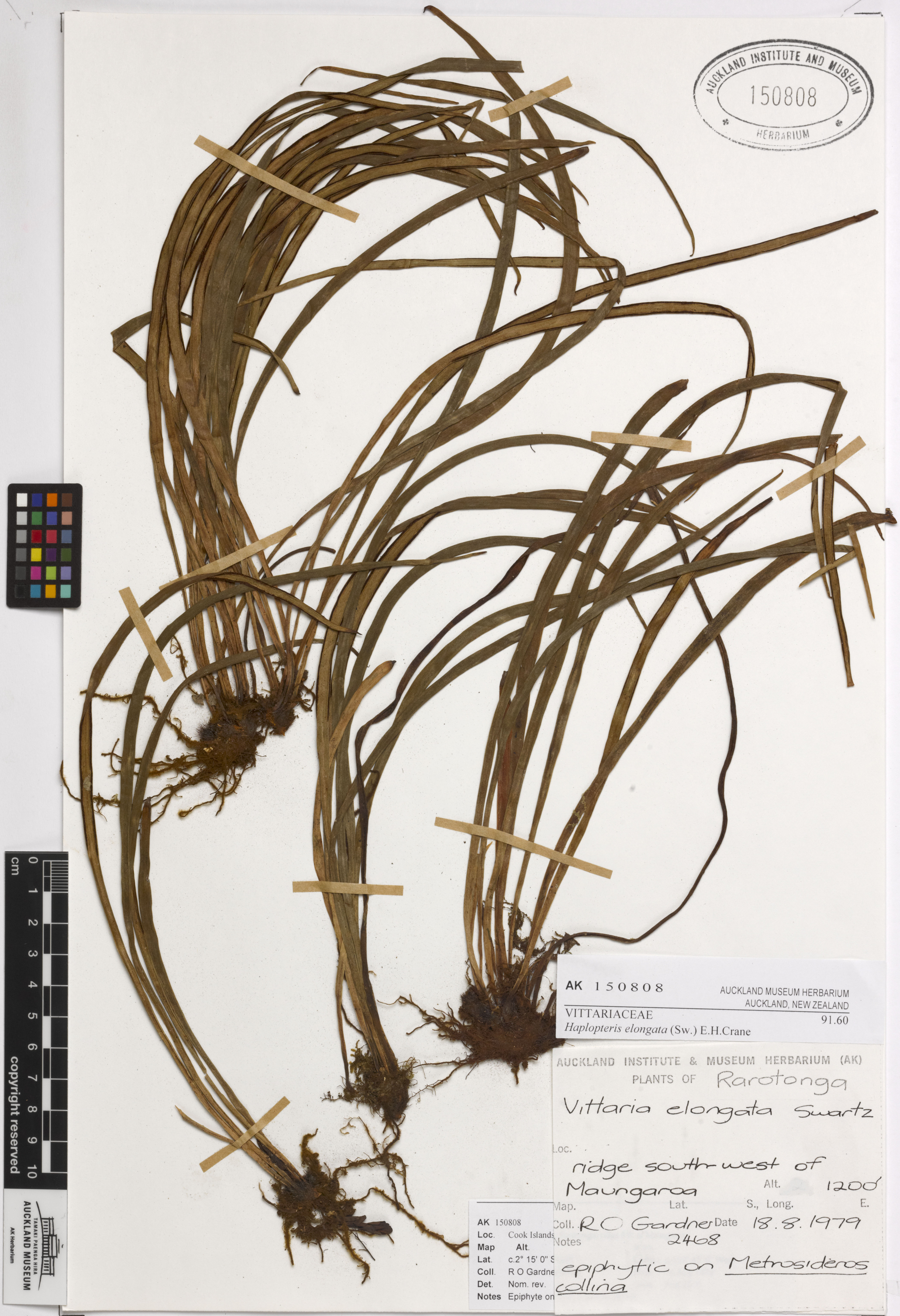
- Haplopteris elongata

Scientific classification
- Kingdom: Plantae
- Clade: Tracheophytes
- Division: Polypodiophyta
- Class: Polypodiopsida
- Order: Polypodiales
- Family: Pteridaceae
- Subfamily: Vittarioideae
- Genus: Haplopteris; C.Presl

Type species
- Haplopteris scolopendrina (Bory) C.Presl

Species
- See text

Synonyms
- Monogramma Comm. ex Schkuhr; Pleurofossa Nakai ex H.Ito; Pleurogramme Brown 1838 non (Blume 1828) Presl 1836; Taeniopteris Hooker 1842 non Brongniart 1829

= Haplopteris =

Genus of ferns

Haplopteris is a genus of vittarioid ferns, a member of subfamily Vittarioideae and family Pteridaceae.

== Description ==
Like other vittarioids, the members of Haplopteris are epiphytes. The rhizome has a distinct upper and lower side, lacking radial symmetry, a characteristic that separates it from Radiovittaria. Leaves are borne in two ranks in a single plane, and are usually simple, occasionally forked. The leaves have a distinct costa (midrib). Most species have netlike leaf veins which form two rows of areolae (the "gaps" in the net) on either side of the midline; two species bear a single leaf vein only. The linear sori, in most species, are confined to a commissural vein (paralleling the edge of the leaf margin and set just back from it, joining the ends of the netted veins); in the two species with a single vein, the sori follow that vein. The sori bear paraphyses (minute hairs) with a cell at the tip shaped like an inverted cone, separating it from Vittaria sensu stricto, with slender paraphyses.

== Taxonomy ==
The genus was first described by Carl Borivoj Presl in 1836, separating it from Pteris sensu Bory. He named it Haplopteris, from the Greek words for "simple" and "fern", in token of the simple fronds typical of the genus. He placed it in tribe Adiantaceae rather than Vittariaceae, although he recognized the similarity of the venation to Vittaria. Presl transferred Bory's Pteris scolopendrina to the genus as the type species.

Molecular phylogenetic studies have shown that the type species of Monogramma is embedded in Haplopteris. Since the name Monogramma has taxonomic priority over Haplopteris, a proposal to reject Monogramma in favor of Haplopteris has been put forth to conserve the name and comparatively stable circumscription of Haplopteris. Thus far, the conservation of Haplopteris has been recommended by the Nomenclature Committee for Vascular Plants.

== Phylogeny ==
Schuettpelz et al. estimated the genus to contain about 40 species. The bulk of them were transferred out of Vittaria by Edmund H. Crane in 1998. 38 have currently been named.

Phylogeny of Haplopteris

- Haplopteris
  - - H. graminea agg.
      - H. graminea Chen, S.Linds. & Schuettpelz 2021
      - - H. volkensii (Hieronymus) Crane
        - - H. humblotii (Hieronymus) S.Linds. & Chen
          - - H. guineensis (Desvaux) Crane
            - H. schliebenii (Reimers) Schuettp.
  - - H. taeniophylla agg.
      - - H. ensata (Christ) C.W.Chen & S.Linds.
        - - H. heterophylla C.W.Chen, Y.H.Chang & Yea C.Liu
          - H. yakushimensis C.W.Chen & Ebihara
      - - - H. amboinensis (Fée) X.C.Zhang
          - - H. pluridichotoma (Bonaparte) Chen, S.Linds. & Cicuzza 2021
            - H. scolopendrina C.Presl
        - - - H. malayensis (Holttum) E.H.Crane
            - H. mediosora (Hayata) X.C.Zhang
          - - H. flexuosa (Fée) E.H.Crane
            - - H. linearifolia (Ching) X.C.Zhang
              - - H. plurisulcata (Ching) X.C.Zhang
                - - H. taeniophylla (Copel.) E.H.Crane
                  - - H. centrochinensis (Ching ex Cheng) Yan, Wei & Zhang 2021
                    - H. fudzinoi (Makino) E.H.Crane
    - H. ensiformis agg.
      - H. longicoma (Christ) Crane
      - - - H. dareicarpa (Hook.) S.Linds. & Chen
          - H. mindanaoensis S.Linds. & Chen
        - - - H. elongata (Sw.) Crane
            - H. zosterifolia (Willd.) Crane
          - - H. angustifolia (Blume) Crane
            - - - H. capillaris (Copel.) C.W.Chen, S.Linds. & K.T.Yong
                - H. sikkimensis (Kuhn) E.H.Crane
              - - H. angustissima (Holttum) S.Linds.
                - - H. sessilifrons (Miyam. & H.Ohba) S.Linds.
                  - - H. ensiformis (Sw.) E.H.Crane
                    - - H. alternans (Copel.) S.Linds. & C.W.Chen
                      - H. anguste-elongata (Hayata) E.H.Crane

Other species include:
- H. exigua (Hieronymus)
- H. hirta (Fée) S.Linds.
- H. microlepis (Hieron.) Mazumdar
- H. owariensis (Fée) E.H.Crane
- H. reekmansii (Pichi Sermolli) Chen & S.Linds. 2021
- H. schaeferi (Hieronymus) Chen & S.Linds. 2021
- H. stenophylla (Copeland) Chen & S.Linds. 2021
- H. vittarioides (Thouars) (Bootlace Fern)
- H. winitii (Tagawa & K.Iwats.) S.Linds.

If the proposal to conserve Haplopteris against Monogramma is accepted, M. graminea will have to be transferred to Haplopteris to maintain the monophyly of the genus.

== Distribution ==
About ten species are native to tropical Africa and the Indian Ocean, while the rest are found in tropical Asia and the Pacific.
