= Monogramma =

Monogramma may refer to:

- Monogramma (alga), a genus of algae in the class Bacillariophyceae, order unknown
- Monogramma (plant), a genus of plants in the family Pteridaceae
