= Vittaria longipes =

Conservation status
- Data Deficient (IUCN 3.1)

Scientific classification
- Kingdom: Plantae
- Clade: Tracheophytes
- Division: Polypodiophyta
- Class: Polypodiopsida
- Order: Polypodiales
- Family: Pteridaceae
- Genus: Vittaria
- Species: V. longipes

Binomial name
- Vittaria longipes Sodiro

Species of fern

Vittaria longipes is a fern species in the subfamily Vittarioideae of the family Pteridaceae. It is endemic to Ecuador. Its natural habitat is subtropical or tropical moist lowland forests. It is threatened by habitat loss.
