= Antrophyopsis =

Scientific classification
- Kingdom: Plantae
- Clade: Tracheophytes
- Division: Polypodiophyta
- Class: Polypodiopsida
- Order: Polypodiales
- Family: Pteridaceae
- Subfamily: Vittarioideae
- Genus: Antrophyopsis (Benedict) Schuett.

Type species
- Antrophyopsis boryana (Willd.) Schuett.

Synonyms
- Antrophyum (Antrophyopsis) Benedict 1907; Antrophyum (Bathia) Christensen 1925

Genus of ferns

Antrophyopsis is a genus of vittarioid ferns, a member of subfamily Vittarioideae and family Pteridaceae. Like other vittarioids, ferns in the genus are epiphytes with simple, straplike leaves. They are native to tropical Africa and islands of the Indian Ocean. The presence of a midrib in their leaves, the shape of their spores, and the shape of cells at the tip of their paraphyses (minute hairs on the spore-bearing structures) help to distinguish members of the genus from other vittarioids. The group was raised to the level of genus in 2016.

== Description ==
Like most other vittarioid ferns, members of the genus have simple, straplike leaves. The rhizome has a distinct upper and lower side, lacking radial symmetry. Leaves are borne in two ranks in a single plane and lack a costa (midrib), unlike Scoliosorus. The leaves have netlike venation, with three or more rows of areolae ("gaps" in the net of veins) on either side of the midline, with the exception of A. bivittata, which has two to three freely branching veins. Sori follow the veins, forming a network in those species with netlike venation. The sori bear paraphyses (minute hairs) with spherical cells at the tip. Spores are monolete, unlike Antrophyum sensu stricto, which has trilete spores.

== Taxonomy ==
Phylogeny of Antrophyopsis

- - A. manniana (Hook.) Schuett.
  - - A. bivittata (C. Chr.) Schuett.
    - - A. boryana (Willd.) Schuett.
      - A. gigantea (Bory) Rouhan, Boullet & Schuettpelz

The genus was originally defined in 1907 by Ralph C. Benedict as a subgenus of a (broadly defined) Antrophyum, typified by Antrophyum boryanum and including three other species (since reduced to two varieties of Antrophyopsis boryana and the species A. manniana). Benedict noted that the subgenus was distinguished by sori not sunken into the leaf, forming a complete reticulate network, monolete ("diplanate") spores, bulging tips on the paraphyses on the sori, and bumpy cell walls on the scales of the stipe.

The first molecular phylogenetic study of the vittarioids, by Edmund H. Crane, found Antrophyum boryanum to be sister to Scoliosorus ensiformis. As both species share monolete spores, Crane transferred A. boryanum and A. mannianum to Scoliosorus. A more extensive phylogeny using multiple chloroplast markers, published in 2016 by Eric Schuettpelz et al., placed these species together with A. bivittatum in a clade sister to the rest of Antrophyum and distant from Scoliosorus. In light of their distinctive spore morphology and geographic distribution when compared to the remainder of Antrophyum, Schuettpelz raised the subgenus to genus level, incorporating the three aforementioned species.

== Distribution ==
Members of the genus are found in tropical Africa and islands of the Indian Ocean.
