= Hecistopteris pinnatifida =

Conservation status
- Vulnerable (IUCN 3.1)

Scientific classification
- Kingdom: Plantae
- Clade: Tracheophytes
- Division: Polypodiophyta
- Class: Polypodiopsida
- Order: Polypodiales
- Family: Pteridaceae
- Genus: Hecistopteris
- Species: H. pinnatifida

Binomial name
- Hecistopteris pinnatifida R.C.Moran & B.Øllg.

Species of fern

Hecistopteris pinnatifida is a fern species in the Vittarioideae subfamily of the Pteridaceae. It is endemic to Ecuador. Its natural habitat is subtropical or tropical moist lowland forests. It is threatened by habitat loss.
