= Barley Barber Swamp =

Coordinates: 27°02′47″N 80°35′14″W

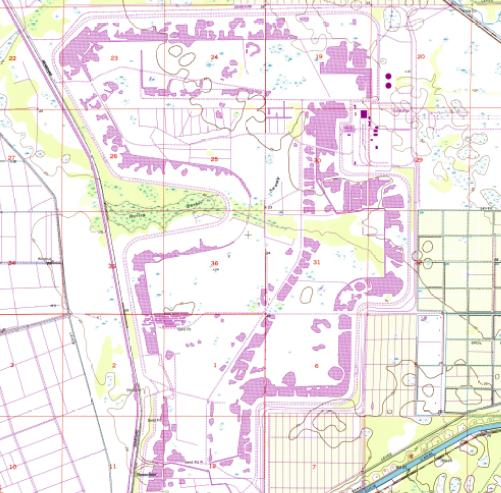
Topographical map from the Department of the Interior showing the Barley Barber Swamp. The green regions include the Barley Barber cypress forest, wetlands, and a navigable waterway that connects to Lake Okeechobee. The squared feature that surrounds the swamp is the 17 mi (27 km) cooling pond of Florida Power & Light's Martin County power plant.

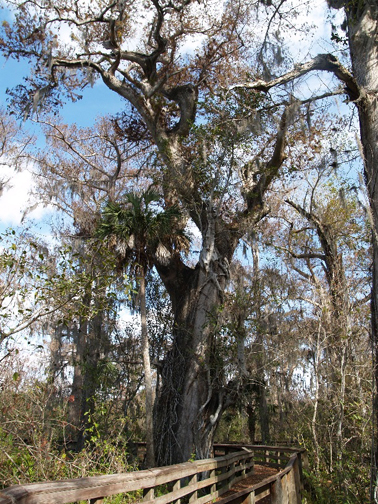
The primary feature of the Barley Barber Swamp is its ancient bald cypress trees. This one is estimated at over 1,000 years old.

The Barley Barber Swamp, once a vast bald cypress forest and waterway in the Greater Everglades watershed, is a 450-acre (180 ha) parcel of land surrounded by Florida Power & Light's (FPL) Martin County power plant. The swamp is located just over a mile east of Lake Okeechobee and due west of Indiantown, Florida. The old-growth cypress swamp is named after Barley Barber, a man who lived in the area at the turn of the 20th century. Little is known of the man Barley Barber except that he left the region after he had "trouble with the law."

== Location and history ==
Historically, Barley Barber Swamp connected regional wetlands, including the Allapatah Marsh, to Lake Okeechobee, ultimately feeding the Everglades ecosystem further south.

The region was once a center of trading for the indigenous people of the Lake Okeechobee area. A 16 ft (4.9 m) tall sand mound with ramp extensions sits in what remains today of the Barley Barber Swamp. Anthropologists contend that the indigenous culture of the area converged on the mound to trade in pottery. Pottery shards and human remains found on the mound are 300 to 900 years old.

Significant hydrological changes occurred in Barley Barber starting in the late 19th century with the construction of Henry Flagler's Florida East Coast Railway. Regional drainage projects, highways, and the construction of the Herbert Hoover Dike around Lake Okeechobee altered and disrupted the natural flow. Today the Barley Barber waterway is diverted through the L-65 canal into the St. Lucie canal before it reaches Lake Okeechobee. Nevertheless it remains navigable and interconnected.

== Flora and fauna ==
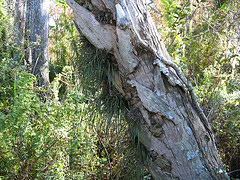
Shoestring fern In Barley Barber

One of the oldest bald cypress (Taxodium distichum) trees in the entire Southeastern U.S. sits in Barley Barber Swamp. It is estimated at over 1,000 years old, stands 88 ft (27 m) tall, and has a circumference of 33 ft (10 m). There are also Florida strangler figs (Ficus aurea), swamp maples (Acer rubrum), and pond apples (Annona glabra). Barley Barber is home to a pair of nesting bald eagles, American alligators, North American river otters, bobcats, white-tailed deer and numerous unique plant species, including giant leather ferns (Acrostichum danaeifolium), shoestring ferns (Vittaria lineata) and whisk ferns (Psilotum species), which are fern-like vascular plants. Many species of migratory and wading birds, such as egrets, ibises, limpkin, and the endangered wood stork, can be seen in the swamp.

== Tourism ==
Florida Power & Light acquired the land surrounding the Barley Barber Swamp in 1972 in order to construct the Martin County power plant. In the 1973 Environmental Impact Statement (EIS) Florida Power & Light states that "FPL has designated the facilities of this project so that the swamp, containing several of Florida's endangered species, will not only be saved but will be preserved and enhanced." After the plant's opening, the company constructed and opened a 1.9 mi (3.1 km) boardwalk for tours in Barley Barber Swamp. Local businesses in Indiantown, such as the historic Seminole Inn, coordinated tourism for the swamp. Barley Barber served as an environmental and economic asset to the small, rural community.

Following the September 11, 2001 attacks, FPL closed off all access to the Barley Barber Swamp citing security concerns.

== Controversy ==
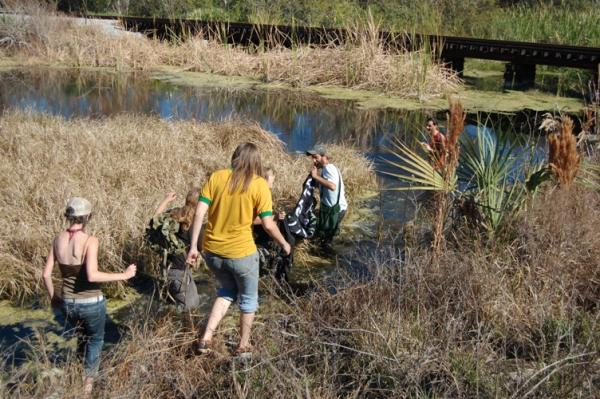
Barley Barber Swamp protesters entering swamp through waterway

Martin County sheriff's officer climbs tree to bring out tree sitter Stevie Lowe in Barley Barber Swamp

Beginning on 5 January 2009, 30 environmental activists staged a five-day vigil along the Barley Barber Swamp to draw attention to what they claimed were damages being wrought by the power company's 3,705 megawatt Martin County plant. They also claimed that the swamp and its waterway is not a part of Florida Power & Light property but rather Waters of the State and Waters of the U.S., held for use by the public. The activists claim that the Martin County power plant is drawing water from the aquifer below the swamp causing the soil to subside below the root systems of the trees, resulting in declining forest health. On January 10, seventeen of the activists were arrested for trespassing. Florida Power & Light has since stated that the company will reopen the Barley Barber Swamp by 2010.

Much of the evidence behind claims of the Martin Plant's detrimental impacts on the Barley Barber Swamp come from research conducted by hydro-ecologist Dr. Sydney Bacchus. Bacchus has stated that the power plant's cooling pond and water use have caused "surficial aquifer draw down." Through the lowering of the water table, Bacchus argues, the ecosystem, including wildlife and the ancient cypress trees, is dying.

On 23 July 2009, Stevie Lowe, one of the seventeen activists arrested at the Barley Barber protest, stood trial for trespassing into Barley Barber Swamp where she chained herself to a swamp maple. The jury found Stevie "not guilty" of trespassing. She was however convicted of "resisting arrest without violence." That the State Attorney's office of Martin County did not prove FPL's ownership of Barley Barber Swamp has led the activists to further their claim that the Barley Barber Swamp is Waters of the United States held for the use of the public rather than FPL's private property.
