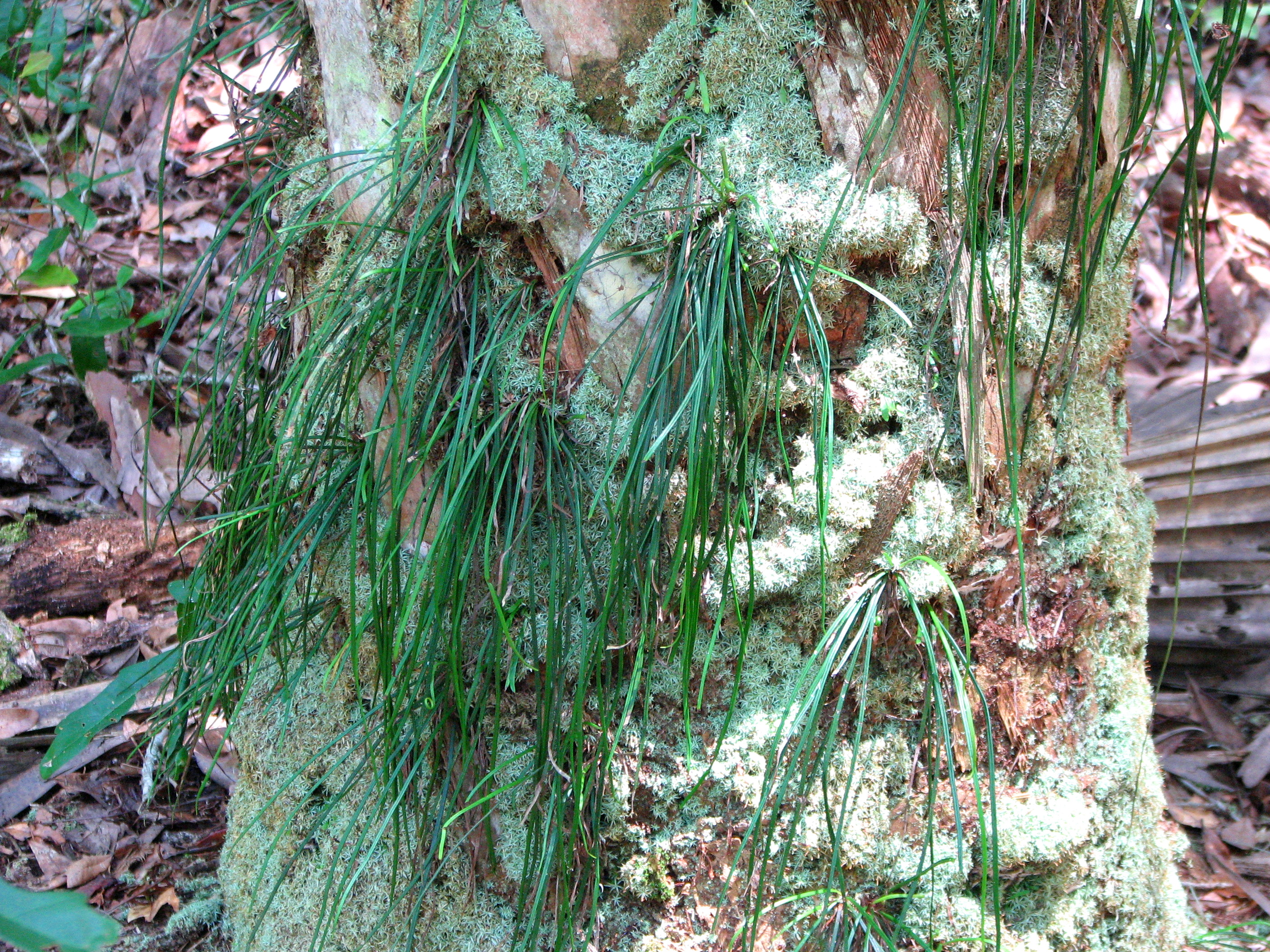
- Vittaria lineata

Scientific classification
- Kingdom: Plantae
- Clade: Tracheophytes
- Division: Polypodiophyta
- Class: Polypodiopsida
- Order: Polypodiales
- Family: Pteridaceae
- Subfamily: Vittarioideae
- Genus: Vittaria; Sm.

Type species
- Vittaria lineata (L.) Sm.

Synonyms
- Oetosis de Necker ex Greene 1900 non de Necker ex Kuntze 1891; Taeniopsis Smith 1841

= Vittaria =

Genus of ferns

Vittaria, the shoestring ferns, is a genus of ferns in the Vittarioideae subfamily of the family Pteridaceae. It had previously been placed in the family Vittariaceae, but that family is no longer recognized.

Vittaria consists of epiphytes, with simple, entire, narrowly linear fronds. It comprises six species, five of which are native to the neotropics. Vittaria isoetifolia is native to tropical Africa and islands of the southwestern Indian Ocean. Vittaria isoetifolia and Vittaria lineata are known, albeit rarely, in cultivation.

Vittaria was named by James Edward Smith in 1793 in Mémoires de l'Académie Royale des Sciences (Turin). The generic name is derived from the Latin, vitta, meaning "a band or ribbon".

In 1990, Vittaria was defined broadly and estimated to have between 50 and 80 species. The genus is difficult to divide into species, and many of the species are only doubtfully distinct. In a 1997 revision of the vittarioid ferns, only 34 species were recognized in Vittaria sensu lato. Twenty of these were transferred to Haplopteris and eight to Radiovittaria, leaving only six in Vittaria.

== Phylogeny ==
Phylogeny of Vittaria

- - - V. isoetifolia Bory 1804
    - V. lineata L. Sm. 1793 (Shoestring fern)
  - - V. appalachiana Farrar & Mickel 1991 (Appalachian shoestring remote)
    - - V. graminifolia Kaulf. 1824 (Grass fern)
      - V. scabrida Klotzsch ex Fée 1851 (doubtfully distinct from V. graminifolia)

Other species include:

- V. flavicosta Mickel & Beitel 1988
- V. longipes Sodiro 1893
