= Antrophyum austroqueenslandicum =

Conservation status
- Critically endangered (EPBC Act)

Scientific classification
- Kingdom: Plantae
- Clade: Tracheophytes
- Division: Polypodiophyta
- Class: Polypodiopsida
- Order: Polypodiales
- Family: Pteridaceae
- Genus: Antrophyum
- Species: A. austroqueenslandicum

Binomial name
- Antrophyum austroqueenslandicum D.L.Jones, 1998

Extinct species of fern

Antrophyum austroqueenslandicum (previously A. sp. Blue Pool) was a species of epiphytic or lithophytic fern known from subtropical rainforest in Lamington National Park in the state of Queensland, Australia. Only one plant was known in the wild and when this plant died the specimen was preserved and used to describe the species. Further searching in nearby habitat has not located any more specimens of this fern.

It is listed was Presumed Extinct under the Queensland Nature Conservation Act. The habitat of this species is protected and has not suffered significant disturbance and other populations of this fern may still exist in unexplored areas of the McPherson Range. The scientifically unexplored nature of these mountains is shown by the recent discovery of two large tree species Eucryphia jinksii in 1995 and Eidothea hardeniana in 2000.

== Conservation Status ==
Antrophyum austroqueenslandicum was reclassified from "Extinct" to "Critically Endangered" under the Australian Environment Protection and Biodiversity Conservation Act 1999 in 2020. It is currently listed as "critically endangered" under the Queensland Nature Conservation Act 1992 and the New South Wales Biodiversity Conservation Act 2016.
