= Hecistopteris =

Scientific classification
- Kingdom: Plantae
- Clade: Tracheophytes
- Division: Polypodiophyta
- Class: Polypodiopsida
- Order: Polypodiales
- Family: Pteridaceae
- Subfamily: Vittarioideae
- Genus: Hecistopteris; J.Sm.

Type species
- Hecistopteris pumila (Sprengel) J.Sm.

Species
- H. pumila (Sprengel) J.Sm.

Genus of ferns

Hecistopteris is a fern genus in the Vittarioideae subfamily of the Pteridaceae.

== Species ==
The genus Hecistopteris contains the following species:

- Hecistopteris kaieteurensis Kelloff & G.S.McKee
- Hecistopteris pinnatifida R.C.Moran & B.Øllg.
- Hecistopteris pumila (Spreng.) J.Sm. – moss fern
