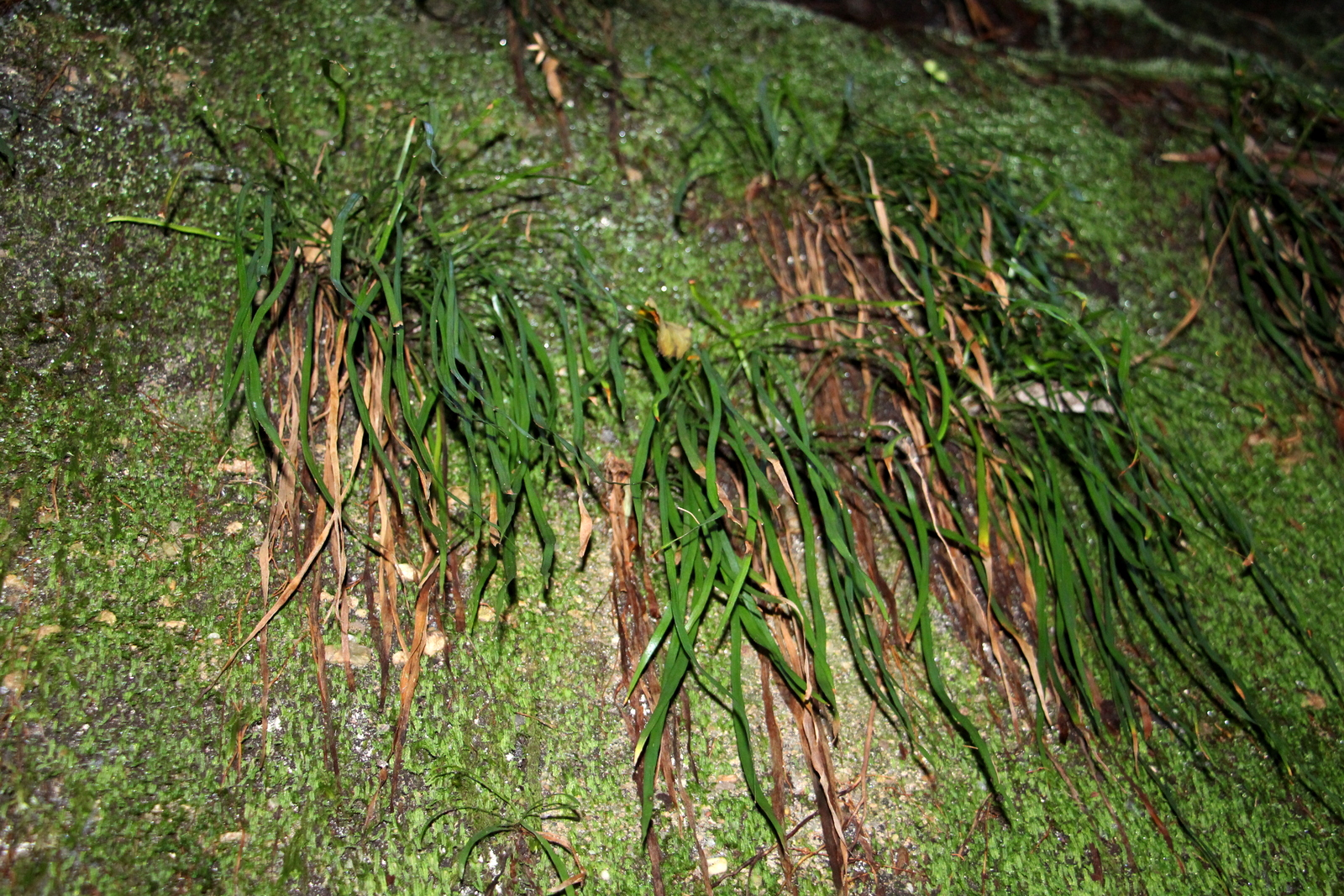

Scientific classification
- Kingdom: Plantae
- Clade: Tracheophytes
- Division: Polypodiophyta
- Class: Polypodiopsida
- Order: Polypodiales
- Family: Pteridaceae
- Genus: Haplopteris
- Species: H. ensiformis

Binomial name
- Haplopteris ensiformis (Sw.) E.H.Crane

Synonyms
- 11 synonyms: Oetosis ensiformis (Sw.) Greene; Vittaria elongata var. ensiformis (Sw.) C.Chr.; Vittaria ensiformis Sw.; Haplopteris hainanensis (C.Chr. ex Ching) E.H.Crane; Vittaria bensei Alderw.; Vittaria bonincola H.Itô; Vittaria ensifolia Blume; Vittaria hainanensis C.Chr. ex Ching; Vittaria incurvata Cav.; Vittaria montana Manickam; Vittaria plantaginea Bory; Vittaria sessilis Copel.

= Haplopteris ensiformis =

Species of fern

Haplopteris ensiformis, commonly known as the tape fern or shoestring fern, is a species of small fern native to tropical areas from eastern Africa and Madagascar, through south and southeast Asia, to Australia and islands of the Pacific. It grows on rocks and tree trunks in rainforest.

== Description ==
Haplopteris ensiformis is a small epiphytic or lithophytic that has short-creeping, rhizomes densely covered in scales and ginger hairs. The dark green fronds are clustered, linear and pendant, about 6 mm (0.24 in) wide and up to 50 cm (20 in) long. Newly emerging fronds are pale pink or red. Sori are produced in continuous lines just inside the margins on the underside of the fronds.

== Distribution ==
The species is native to the following regions as defined in the World Geographical Scheme for Recording Plant Distributions:

- East Tropical Africa: Tanzania
- South Tropical Africa: Zimbabwe
- Western Indian Ocean: Madagascar, Mauritius, Réunion, Seychelles
- China: China South-Central, Hainan
- Eastern Asia: Kazan-retto, Ogasawara-shoto, Taiwan
- Indian Subcontinent: India
- Indo-China: Cambodia, Laos, Thailand, Vietnam
- Malesia: Borneo, Java, Lesser Sunda Islands, Malaya, Maluku, Philippines, Sulawesi, Sumatra
- Papuasia: Bismarck Archipelago, New Guinea, Solomon Islands
- Australia: New South Wales, Northern Territory, Queensland
- Southwestern Pacific: Samoa, Tonga, Vanuatu
- South-Central Pacific: Easter Islands, Marquesas, Tubuai Islands
- Northwestern Pacific: Caroline Islands, Marianas, Marshall Islands

== Habit and habitat ==
It grows on tree trunks, logs, rock faces and boulders in rainforest. It also occurs in other wet forest types such as the wet sclerophyll forests of eastern Australia.

== Conservation ==
The conservation status of this plant varies across its distribution. In Zimbabwe it is considered to be endangered, and in the Northern Territory it is listed as near threatened, while in Queensland and Singapore it has least concern status. As of January 2026, it has not been assessed by the IUCN.

== Gallery ==
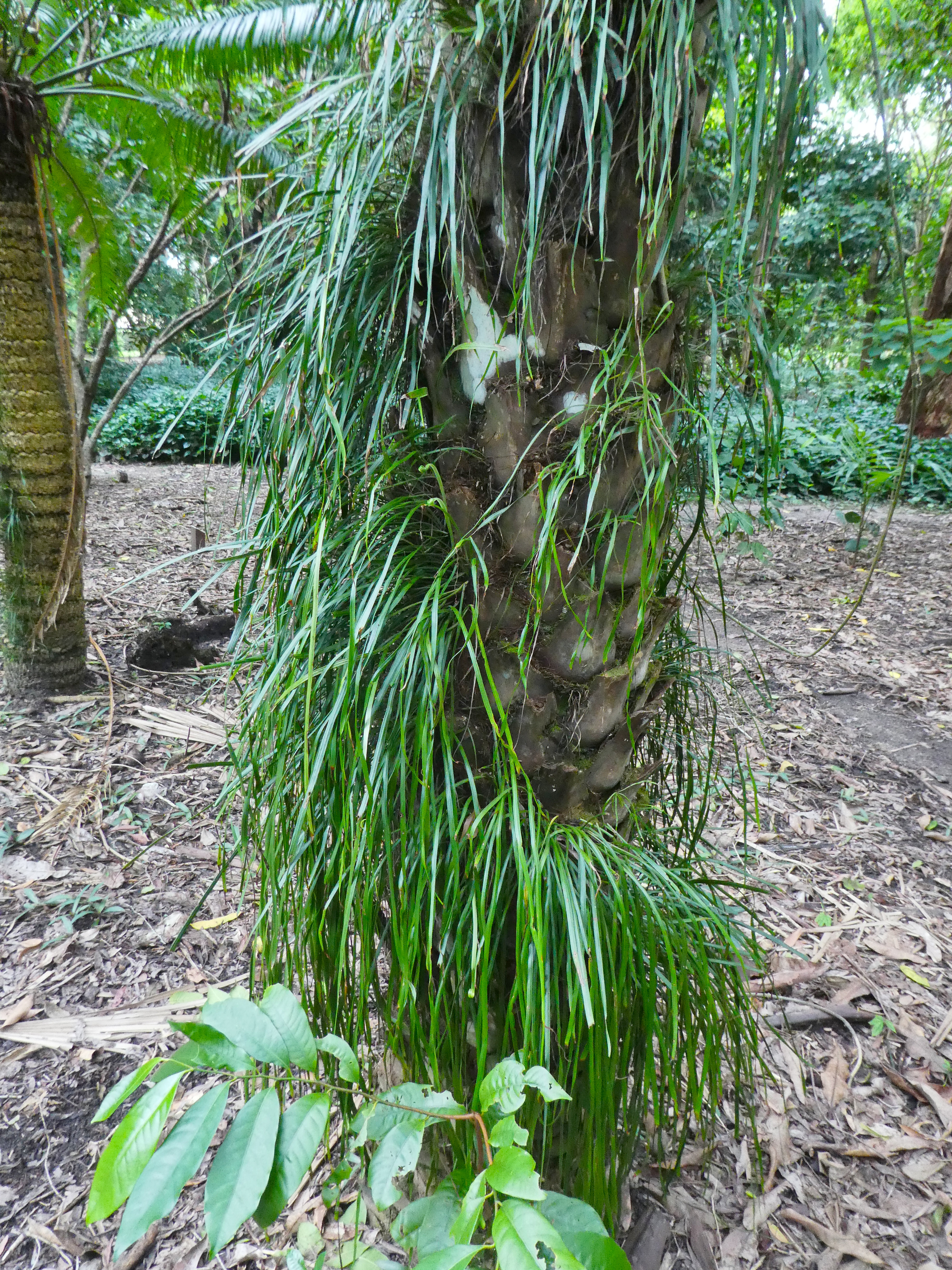
Growing on a palm trunk

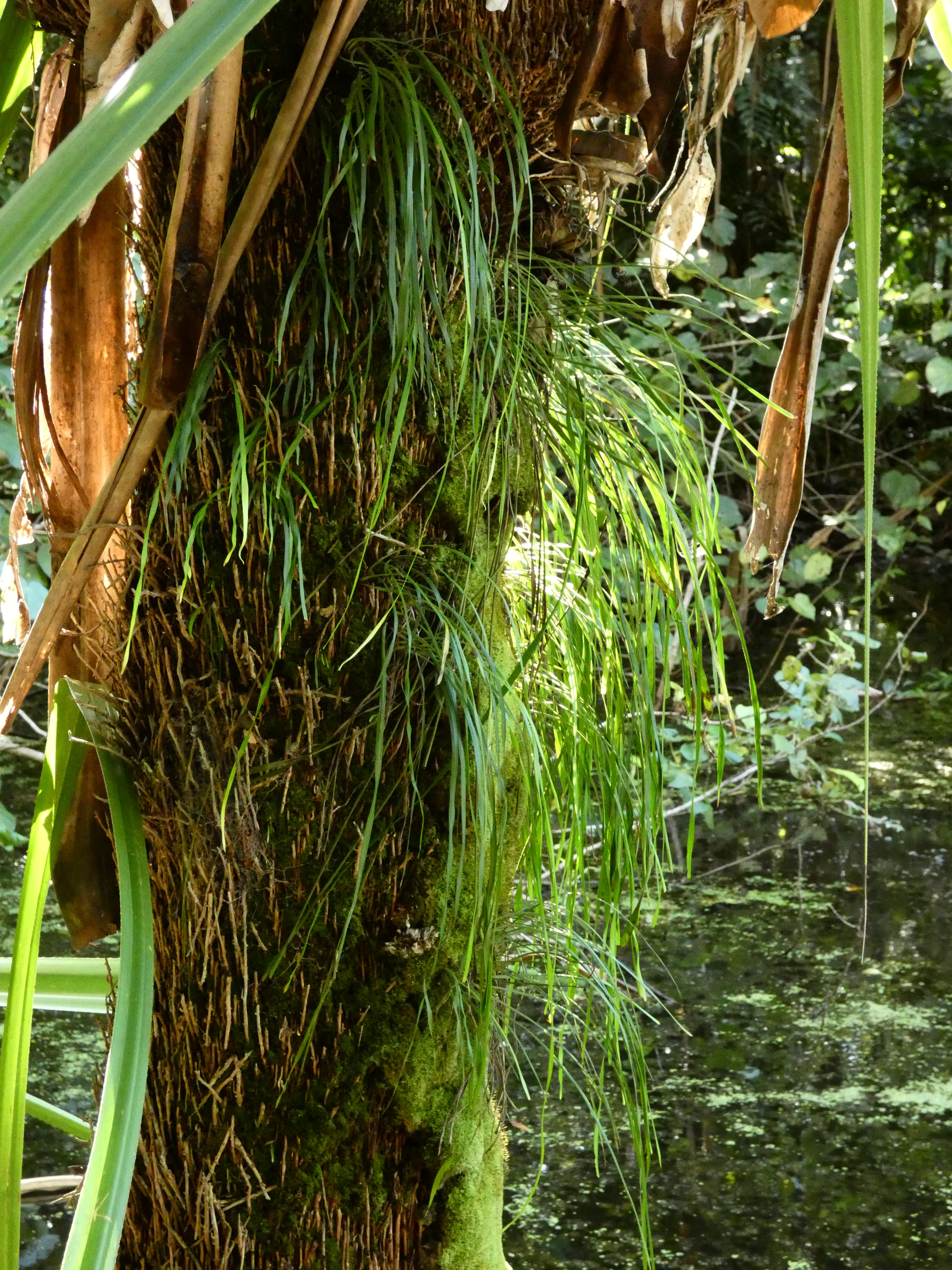
Growing on a Pandanus trunk in swamp forest

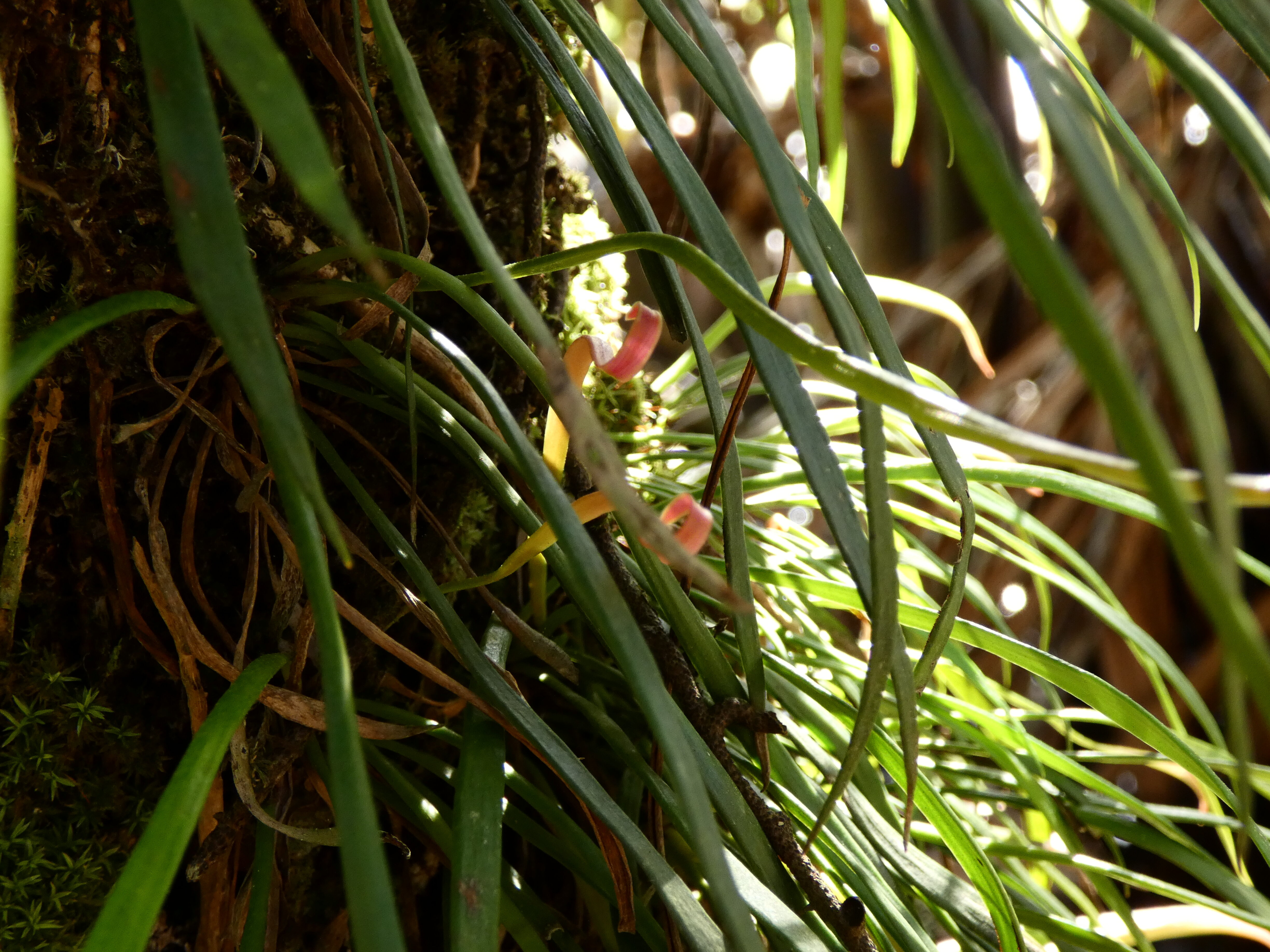
Rosy coloured new croziers

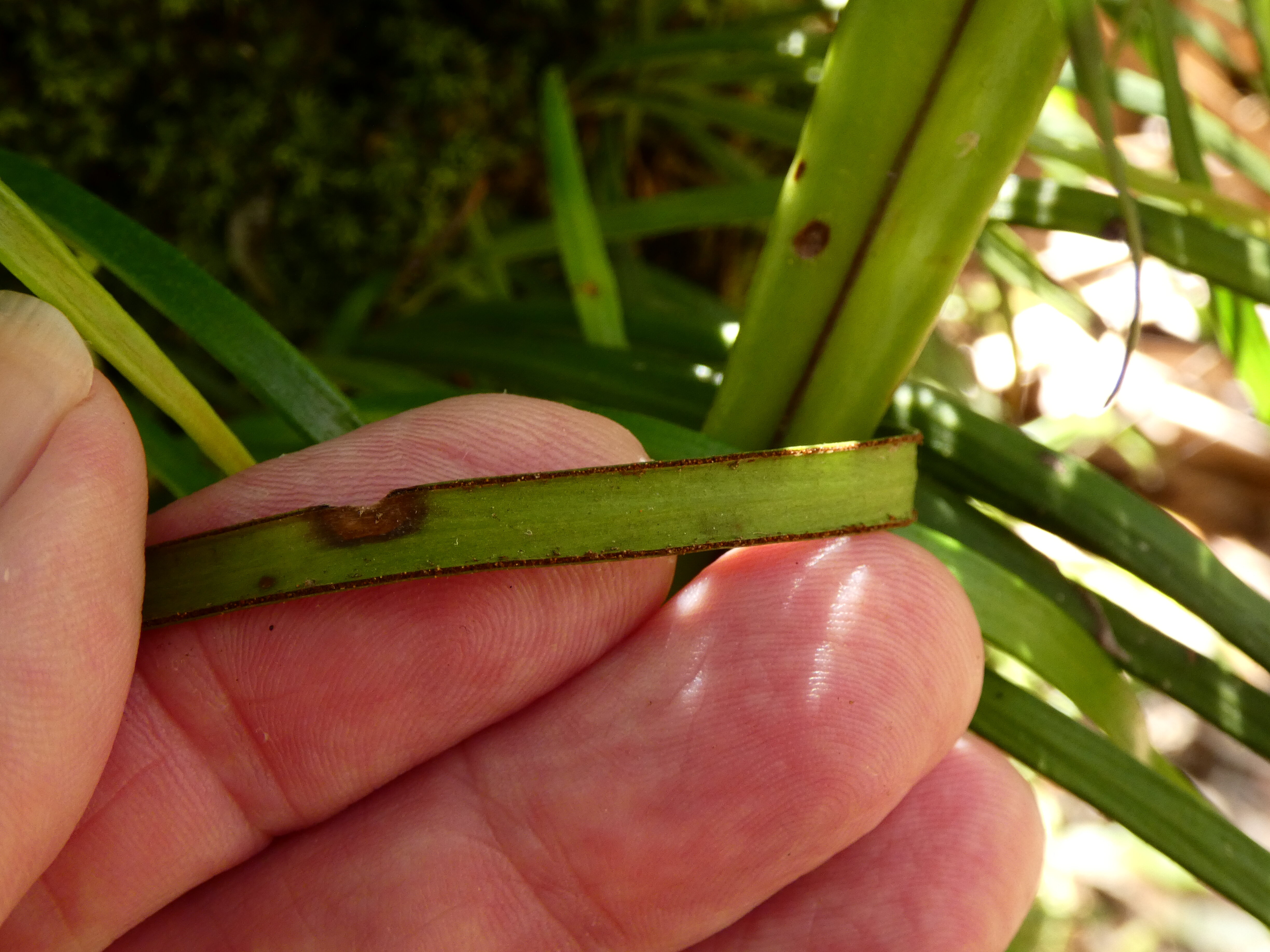
Sori
