= Rheopteris =

Scientific classification
- Kingdom: Plantae
- Clade: Tracheophytes
- Division: Polypodiophyta
- Class: Polypodiopsida
- Order: Polypodiales
- Family: Pteridaceae
- Subfamily: Vittarioideae
- Genus: Rheopteris; Alston
- Species: R. cheesmaniae

Binomial name
- Rheopteris cheesmaniae Alston

Genus of ferns

Rheopteris is a genus of ferns in the subfamily Vittarioideae of the family Pteridaceae with a single species, Rheopteris cheesmaniae, in the Pteridophyte Phylogeny Group classification of 2016 (PPG I). Other sources sink the genus into Monogramma, a genus not recognized in PPG I. The species is native to New Guinea.
