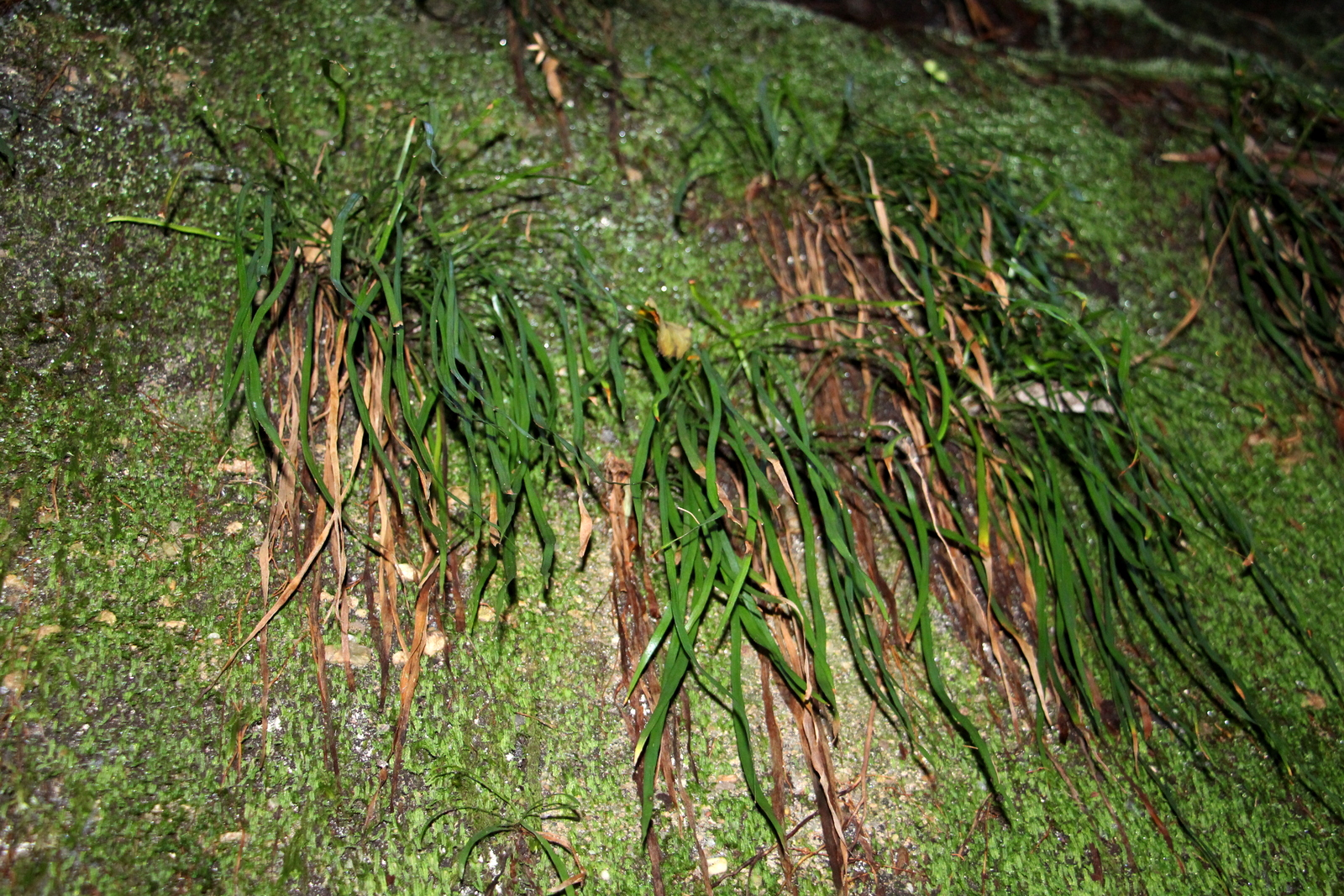

Scientific classification
- Kingdom: Plantae
- Clade: Tracheophytes
- Division: Polypodiophyta
- Class: Polypodiopsida
- Order: Polypodiales
- Family: Pteridaceae
- Genus: Haplopteris
- Species: H. elongata

Binomial name
- Haplopteris elongata (Sw.) E.H.Crane

Synonyms
- Vittaria elongata Sw.

= Haplopteris elongata =

Tape fern

Species of fern

Haplopteris elongata, commonly known as the tape fern, is a species of epiphytic fern. In eastern Australia, it grows in rainforests north from the Richmond River in the south, to tropical Queensland in the north.
