= Vaginularia =

Scientific classification
- Kingdom: Plantae
- Clade: Tracheophytes
- Division: Polypodiophyta
- Class: Polypodiopsida
- Order: Polypodiales
- Family: Pteridaceae
- Subfamily: Vittarioideae
- Genus: Vaginularia; Fée

Type species
- Vaginularia trichoidea Fée

Species
- See text

Synonyms
- Diclidopteris Brack.

Genus of ferns

Vaginularia is a genus of ferns in the subfamily Vittarioideae of the family Pteridaceae in the Pteridophyte Phylogeny Group classification of 2016 (PPG I). Other sources sink the genus into Monogramma, a genus not recognized in PPG I.

== Phylogeny ==
As of December 2019, the Checklist of Ferns and Lycophytes of the World recognized the following species:

Phylogeny of Vaginularia

- Vaginularia
  - V. acrocarpa Holttum
  - - V. junghuhnii Mett.
    - - V. paradoxa (Fée) Mett.
      - V. trichoidea Fée

Other species include:
- V. emarginata (Brause) Goebel
- V. subfalcata (Hook.) C.Chr.
