= Hecistopteris kaieteurensis =

Scientific classification
- Kingdom: Plantae
- Clade: Tracheophytes
- Division: Polypodiophyta
- Class: Polypodiopsida
- Order: Polypodiales
- Family: Pteridaceae
- Genus: Hecistopteris
- Species: H. kaieteurensis

Binomial name
- Hecistopteris kaieteurensis Kelloff & McKee

Species of fern

Hecistopteris kaieteurensis is a tiny fern in the family Pteridaceae and endemic to the drift zone of Kaieteur Falls on the Kaieteur Plateau (a tepui) in Guyana. It does not exceed 2 cm (0.79 in) length and is very lightly constructed. It was discovered in 1997 by Gregory S. McKey of the Smithsonian Institution.
