= Ananthacorus =

Scientific classification
- Kingdom: Plantae
- Clade: Tracheophytes
- Division: Polypodiophyta
- Class: Polypodiopsida
- Order: Polypodiales
- Family: Pteridaceae
- Subfamily: Vittarioideae
- Genus: Ananthacorus; Underw. & Maxon
- Species: A. angustifolius

Binomial name
- Ananthacorus angustifolius (Swartz 1788) Underwood & Maxon 1908

Synonyms
- Pteris angustifolia Swartz 1788; Pteropsis angustifolia (Swartz 1788) Desvaux 1827; Taenitis angustifolia (Swartz 1788) Sprengel 1827; Vittaria angustifolia (Swartz 1788) Baker 1870; Oetosis angustifolia (Swartz) Kuntze 1891; Vittaria costata Kunze 1834; Vittaria onusta Trevis. 1851

Genus of ferns

Ananthacorus is a genus of ferns in the subfamily Vittarioideae of the family Pteridaceae with a single species Ananthacorus angustifolius. Its native distribution ranges from Mexico through Central America to northern South America. It has been introduced into parts of Malesia.
