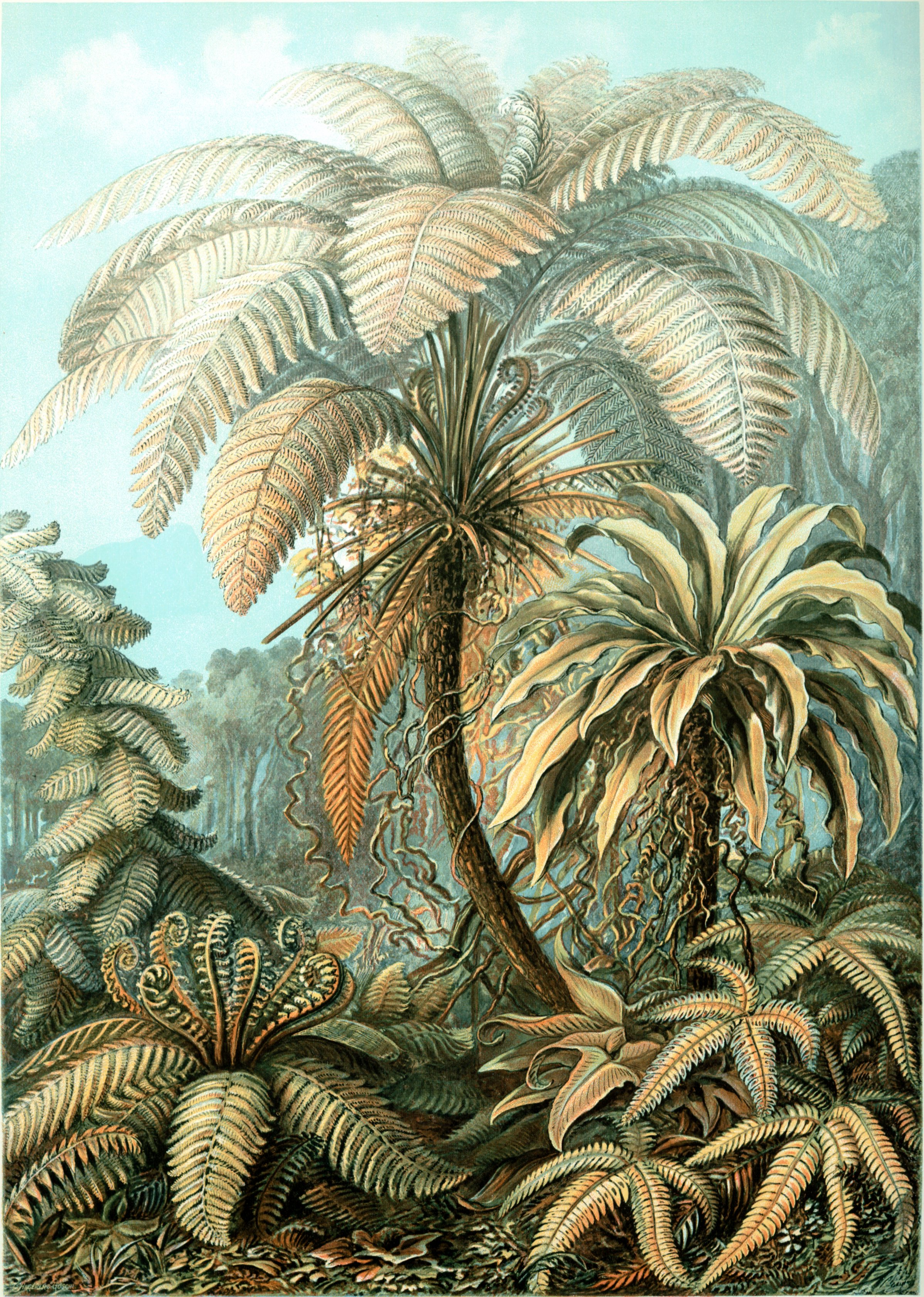
- Haeckel Filicinae

Scientific classification
- Kingdom: Plantae
- Clade: Tracheophytes
- Division: Polypodiophyta
- Class: Polypodiopsida
- Order: Polypodiales
- Family: Pteridaceae
- Subfamily: Vittarioideae
- Genus: Monogramma; Comm. ex Schkuhr

= Monogramma (plant) =

Genus of plants

Monogramma is a genus of ferns belonging to the family Pteridaceae.

== Distribution ==
Its native range is the Western Indian Ocean, and Malesia.

== Species ==
Species:

- Monogramma capillaris Copel.
- Monogramma graminea (Poir.) Schkuhr
