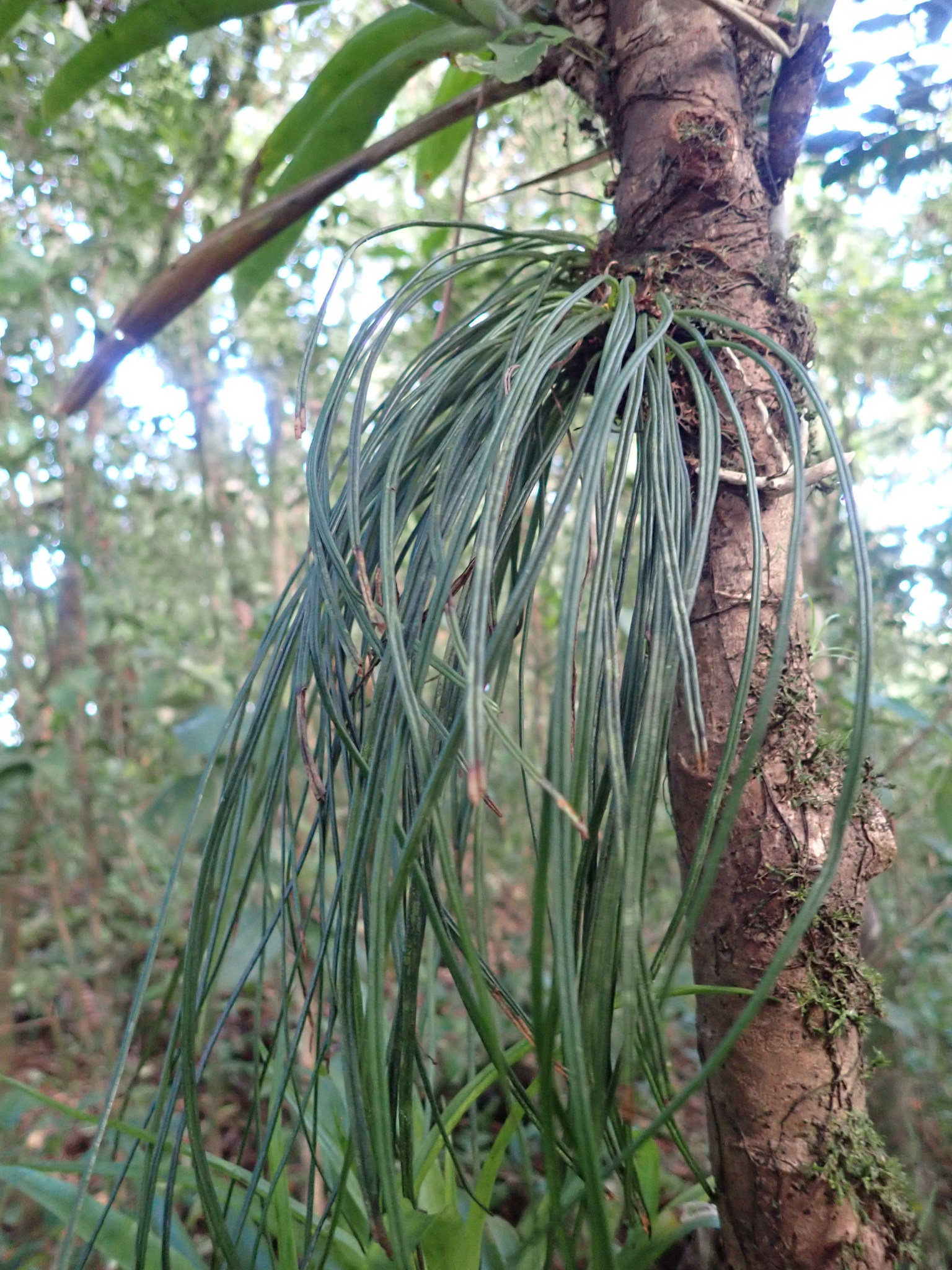

Scientific classification
- Kingdom: Plantae
- Clade: Tracheophytes
- Division: Polypodiophyta
- Class: Polypodiopsida
- Order: Polypodiales
- Family: Pteridaceae
- Genus: Vittaria
- Species: V. lineata

Binomial name
- Vittaria lineata (L.) J.E.Sm.

= Vittaria lineata =

Species of plant

Vittaria lineata, also known by its common name shoestring fern is a species of fern from the genus Vittaria. It grows epiphytically in wet, new-world tropics and subtropics as far north as Florida.
