= Polytaenium =

Scientific classification
- Kingdom: Plantae
- Clade: Tracheophytes
- Division: Polypodiophyta
- Class: Polypodiopsida
- Order: Polypodiales
- Family: Pteridaceae
- Subfamily: Vittarioideae
- Genus: Polytaenium; J.Sm.

Type species
- Polytaenium lanceolatum (Swartz) Desvaux

Species
- See text.

Synonyms
- Antrophyum subg. Polytaenium (Desv.) Bened.; Anetium (Kunze) Splitg.; Pteridanetium Copel. (nom. superfl.); Acrostichum sect. Anetium Kunze

Genus of ferns

Polytaenium is a genus of ferns in the subfamily Vittarioideae of the family Pteridaceae. Species are native to Mexico and Southern America.

== Phylogeny ==
As of December 2019, the Checklist of Ferns and Lycophytes of the World recognized the following species:

Phylogeny of Polytaenium

- - P. citrifolium (L.) Schuettp.
  - - P. lineatum J.Sm.
    - - P. cajenense (Desv.) Benedict
      - - P. guayanense (Hieron.) Alston
        - - P. chlorosporum (Mickel & Beitel) E.H.Crane
          - P. feei (W.Schaffn. ex Fée) Maxon

- P. anetioides Benedict
- P. dussianum Benedict
- P. intramarginale (Baker ex Jenman) Alston
- P. jenmanii Benedict
- P. ophioglossoides (Lellinger) S.Linds.
- P. quadriseriatum Benedict
- P. urbani (Brause) Alain
