= Linnaistensuo Mire =

Nature reserve in Lahti, Finland

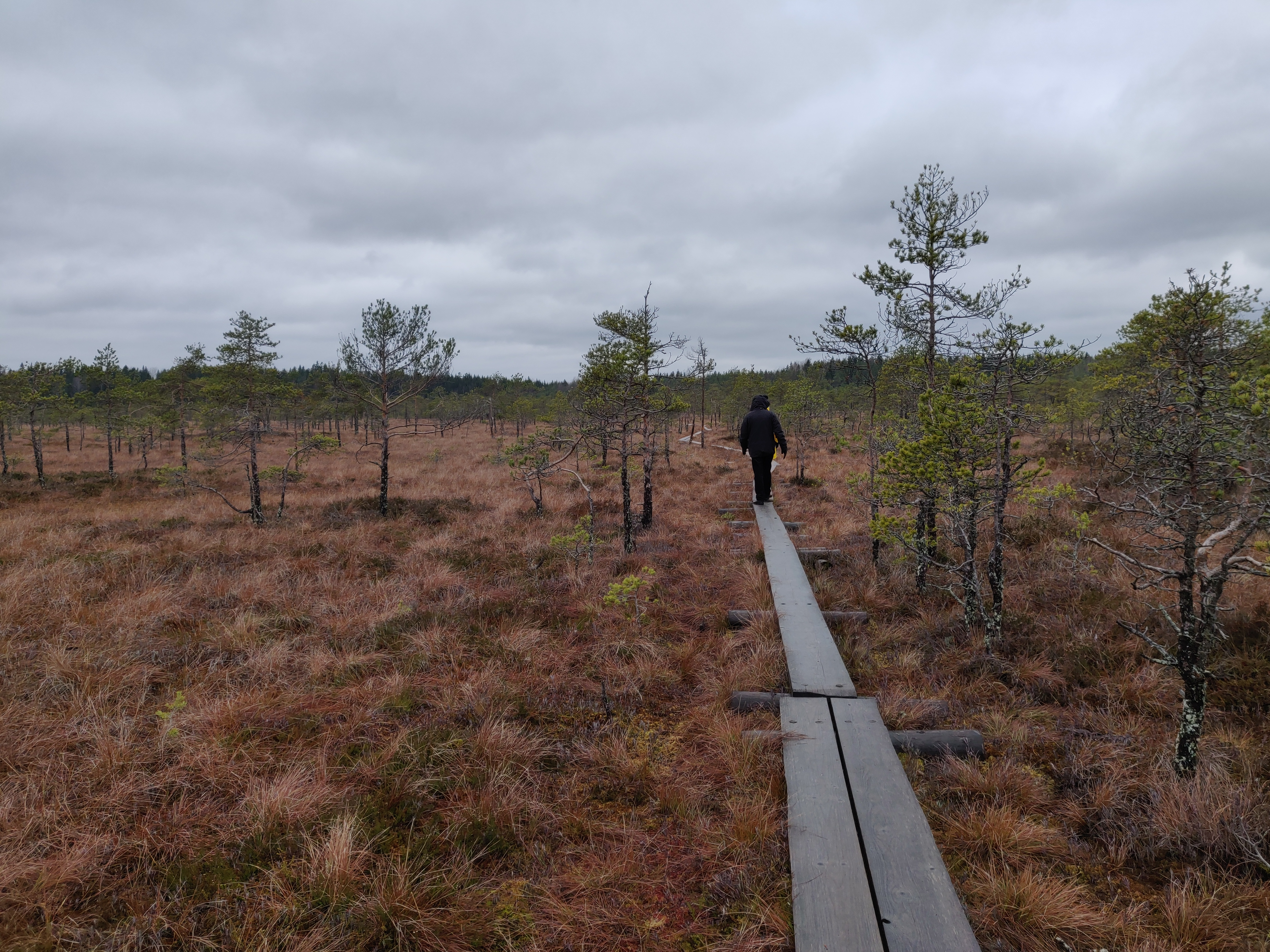
- Nature at Linnaistensuo
- Interactive map of Linnaistensuo Mire
- Location: Lahti, Finland
- Nearest city: Lahti
- Coordinates: 60.941650°N 25.750552°E
- Website: Official website, in Finnish

The Linnaistensuo Mire is a nature reserve in Lahti, Finland. It is a typical southern Finnish raised bog. It is located in the Kujala area near Linnaistenmäki, 7 kilometers from the city centre of Lahti.

Linnaistensuo has an area of 200 hectares. It contains 15 different natural mire types; and the average depth of peat in Linnaistensuo is 2.9 metres. A boardwalk trail, 1.5 kilometers long, crosses the area. Linnaistensuo is also a popular destination for short hikes.

Ditches at Linnainensuo have been blocked, and a project was initiated between 2002 and 2004 to restore the natural state of the area. During the first phase, 100 hectares were protected, and the protected area has since been expanded. Thanks to the additional areas added in 2003, the nature reserve now encompasses approximately 200 hectares.

Linnainensuo was accepted into the European Union's Natura 2000 network in 1998 as a representative example of raised bog nature in southern Finland.
