= Radiovittaria =

Scientific classification
- Kingdom: Plantae
- Clade: Tracheophytes
- Division: Polypodiophyta
- Class: Polypodiopsida
- Order: Polypodiales
- Family: Pteridaceae
- Subfamily: Vittarioideae
- Genus: Radiovittaria (Benedict) E.H.Crane

Type species
- Radiovittaria remota (Fée) E.H.Crane

Species
- See text

Synonyms
- Vittaria subgen. Radiovittaria Benedict

Genus of ferns

Radiovittaria is a genus of ferns in the subfamily Vittarioideae of the family Pteridaceae. Species are native to southeast Mexico and northern Southern America.

== Phylogeny ==
As of December 2019, the Checklist of Ferns and Lycophytes of the World recognized the following species:

Phylogeny of Radiovittaria

- Radiovittaria
  - - R. moritziana (Mett.) E.H.Crane
    - R. ruiziana (Fée) E.H.Crane
  - - R. latifolia (Benedict) E.H.Crane
    - - R. minima (Baker) E.H.Crane
      - - R. stipitata (Kunze) E.H.Crane
        - - R. gardneriana (Fée) E.H.Crane
          - R. remota (Fée) E.H.Crane

Other species include:
- R. andina Rojas
- R. karsteniana (Mettenius) Rojas
- R. salvo-tierrana Rojas
