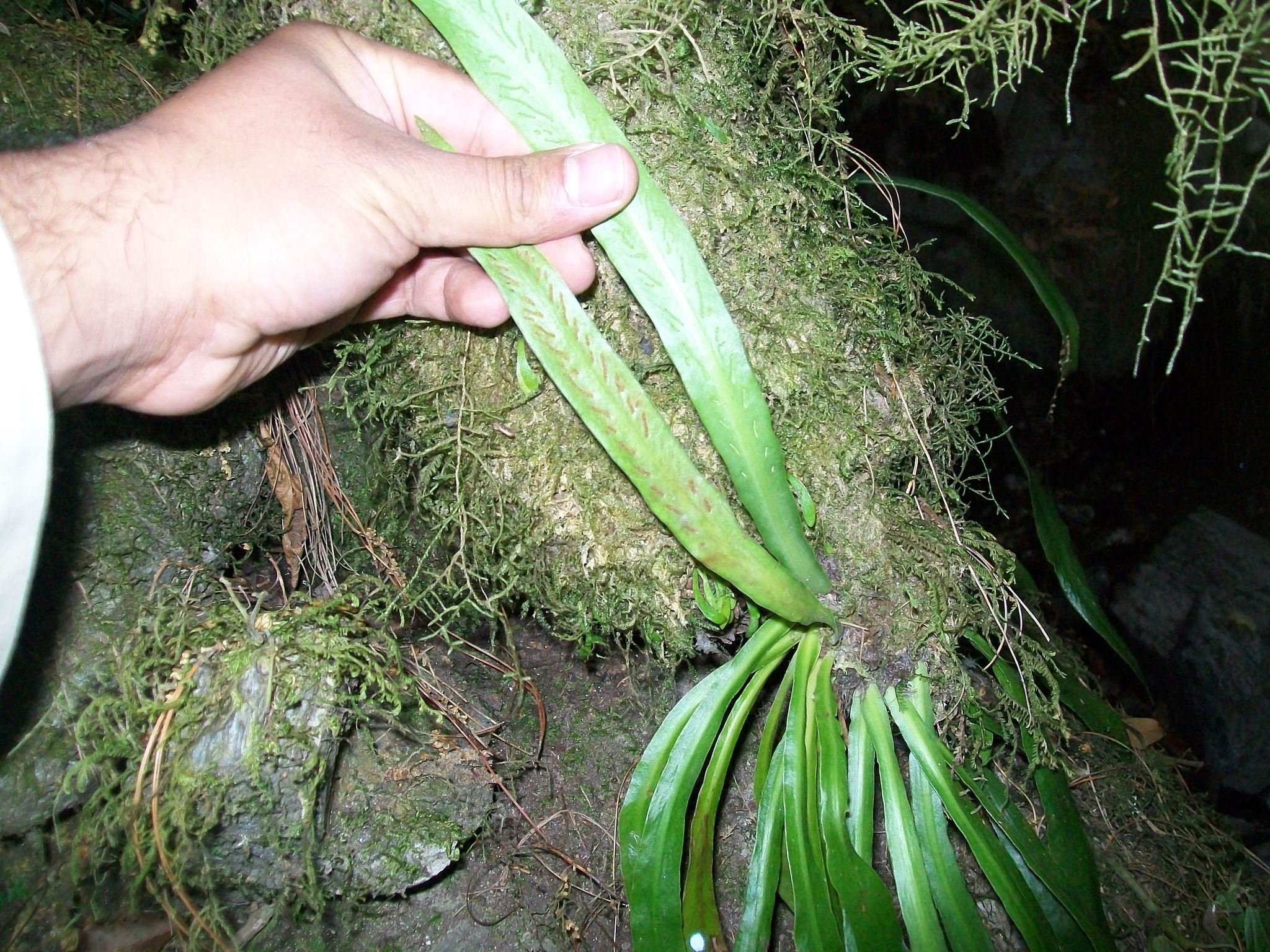
- Scoliosorus ensiformis in Mexico

Scientific classification
- Kingdom: Plantae
- Clade: Tracheophytes
- Division: Polypodiophyta
- Class: Polypodiopsida
- Order: Polypodiales
- Family: Pteridaceae
- Subfamily: Vittarioideae
- Genus: Scoliosorus; T.Moore

Type species
- Scoliosorus ensiformis (Hooker) Moore

Synonyms
- Genus: Antrophyum (Scoliosorus) (Moore) Bened.; Species: Antrophyum carnosum Liebm.; Antrophyum discoideum Liebm.; Antrophyum ensiforme Hook.; Antrophyum falcatum M.Martens & Galeotti; Antrophyum galeottii Fée; Dictyogramme ensiformis (Hook.) Trevis.; Polytaenium ensiforme (Hook.) Benedict

= Scoliosorus =

Genus of ferns

Scoliosorus is a genus of ferns in the subfamily Vittarioideae of the family Pteridaceae with a single species, Scoliosorus ensiformis. The species is native to Mexico and Central America.
