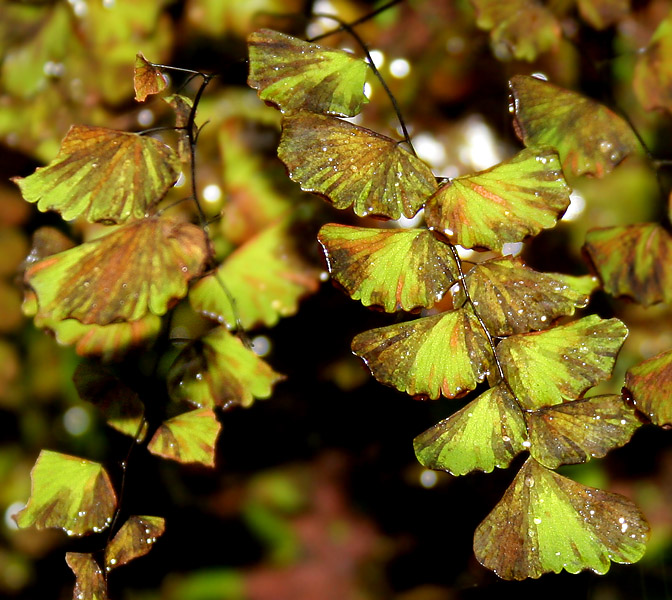
- Adiantum lunulatum

Scientific classification
- Kingdom: Plantae
- Clade: Tracheophytes
- Division: Polypodiophyta
- Class: Polypodiopsida
- Order: Polypodiales
- Family: Pteridaceae
- Subfamily: Vittarioideae (C.Presl) Crabbe, Jermy & Mickel 1975

Genera
- See text.

Synonyms
- Adiantoideae (C.Presl) R.M.Tryon

= Vittarioideae =

Subfamily of ferns

Vittarioideae is a subfamily of the fern family Pteridaceae, in the order Polypodiales. The subfamily includes the previous families Adiantaceae (adiantoids or maidenhair ferns) and Vittariaceae (vittarioids or shoestring ferns).

== Description ==
The subfamily includes two distinct groups of ferns: the adiantoids, consisting of the single genus Adiantum, and the vittarioids, several genera, including Vittaria, which typically have highly reduced leaves, usually entire, and an epiphytic habit. The ferns historically considered as Adiantum include both petrophilic and terrestrial plants. The vittarioid ferns are primarily epiphytic in tropical regions and all have simple leaves with sori that follow the veins and lack true indusia; the sori are most often marginal with a false indusium formed from the reflexed leaf margin. The family also includes a species, Vittaria appalachiana, that is highly unusual in that the sporophyte stage of the life cycle is absent. This species consists solely of photosynthetic gametophytes that reproduce asexually.

== Taxonomy ==
Molecular phylogenetic analysis demonstrated that the vittarioid ferns were nested within the genus Adiantum as it was originally circumscribed, making that genus paraphyletic. In the Pteridophyte Phylogeny Group classification of 2016 (PPG I), the family is treated as the subfamily Vittarioideae] of the family Pteridaceae.

The following diagram shows a likely phylogenetic relationship between the Vittarioideae and other subfamilies of the Pteridaceae.

- Pteridaceae
  - Cryptogrammoideae
  - - - Parkerioideae (syn. Ceratopteridoideae)
      - Pteridoideae
    - - Cheilanthoideae
      - Vittarioideae

=== History ===
The first suprageneric classification based on Vittaria was made by Carl Borivoj Presl in 1836, who erected the tribe Vittariaceae to contain the genera Vittaria and Prosaptia, the latter now included in the grammitid ferns. He invented the new genus Haplopteris to accommodate another group of simple-leaved ferns separated from Pteris, but placed it in tribe Adiantaceae instead, due to the location of its sori just behind the leaf margin.

In his 1911 treatment of the tribe, Ralph Benedict adopted a circumscription similar to modern treatments, within which he recognized the genera Ananthacorus, Anetium, Antrophyum, Hecistopteris, Monogramma, Polytaenium, and Vittaria. He described Radiovittaria as a subgenus of Vittaria, subsumed Scoliosorus within Polytaenium as doubtfully worthy of subgeneric rank, while Rheopteris had not yet been discovered. Haplopteris he explicitly synonymized with Vittaria in 1914.

Carl Christensen used the name "Vittarioideae" in Verdoorn's Manual of Pteridology in 1938, but did not include a description, leaving it nomenclaturally invalid. Ren-Chang Ching raised Vittariaceae to the rank of a family in 1940.

The first well-sampled molecular phylogenetic study of the vittarioids was based on the chloroplast gene rbcL. In this study, it was found that the type species of Monogramma is embedded in Haplopteris; the segregation of Vaginularia from Monogramma was also supported, as members of Vaginularia formed a clade sister to Rheopteris and distant from Monogramma sensu stricto. A later molecular phylogeny, published in 2016, established the genus Antrophyopsis (formerly a subgenus of Antrophyum) for three species placed in Scoliosorus but more distant from the type of that genus than Antrophyum. This treatment also sank Anetium into Polytaenium and Monogramma into Haplopteris. Since the name Monogramma has taxonomic priority over Haplopteris, a proposal to reject Monogramma in favor of Haplopteris has been put forth to conserve the name and comparatively stable circumscription of Haplopteris.

== Genera ==
The following genera are recognized in the Pteridophyte Phylogeny Group classification of 2016 (PPG I):

- Adiantum L.
- Ananthacorus Underw. & Maxon
- Antrophyopsis (Benedict) Schuettp.
- Antrophyum Kaulf.
- Haplopteris C.Presl
- Hecistopteris J.Sm.
- Polytaenium Desv.
- Radiovittaria (Benedict) E.H.Crane
- Rheopteris Alston
- Scoliosorus T.Moore
- Vaginularia Fée
- Vittaria Sm.

The following phylogeny for the currently recognized genera of the subfamily was presented by Schuettpelz et al.:

- Vittarioideae
  - Adiantum
  - - - Rheopteris
      - Vaginularia
    - - - - Hecistopteris
          - Radiovittaria
        - Haplopteris (including Monogramma s.s.)
      - - - Antrophyopsis
          - Antrophyum
        - - Polytaenium
          - - - Scoliosorus
              - Ananthacorus
            - Vittaria
