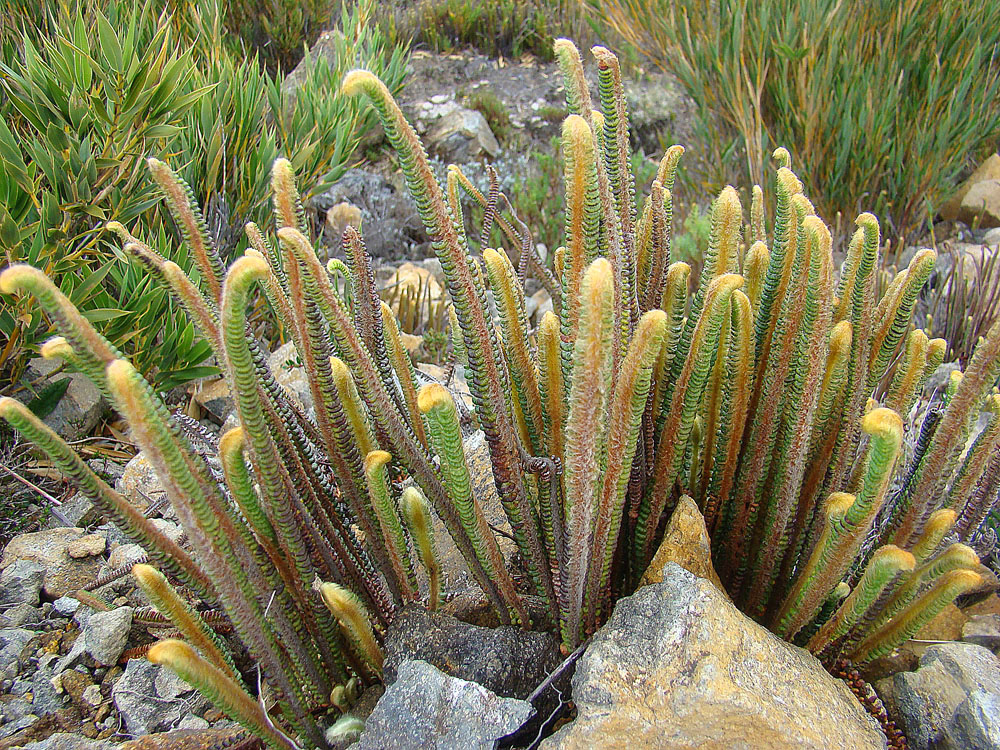
- Jamesonia alstonii in habitat, Cerro de la Muerte, Costa Rica

Scientific classification
- Kingdom: Plantae
- Clade: Tracheophytes
- Division: Polypodiophyta
- Class: Polypodiopsida
- Order: Polypodiales
- Family: Pteridaceae
- Subfamily: Pteridoideae
- Genus: Jamesonia; Hook. & Grev.

Type species
- Jamesonia pulchra Hook. & Grev.

Species
- See text

Synonyms
- Eriosorus Fée; Nephopteris Lellinger; Psilogramme Kuhn

= Jamesonia =

Genus of ferns

Jamesonia is a genus of ferns in the subfamily Pteridoideae of the family Pteridaceae. It now includes the formerly separate genus Eriosorus.

== Description ==
Species of Jamesonia are terrestrial or grow on rocks. They vary considerably in their detailed morphology. The rhizomes are short, dark brown, and creeping, with a more or less dense covering of hairs and bristles. The fertile and infertile fronds are similar. Species show one of two different frond morphologies, related to habitat. These were formerly used to distinguish Jamesonia and Eriosorus, but do not correspond to the evolutionary history of the species. Species with "Jamesonia-type" morphology have many fronds with short, often leathery pinnae, and are associated with exposed habitats. Species with "Eriosorus-type" morphology have fewer fronds with longer, thinner pinnae, and are associated with more sheltered areas including cloud forests. The stalks (petioles and rachises) of the frond are dark brown and usually grooved on the upper (adaxial) surface. The sori occur along the veins of the segments of the fronds or are sometimes spread more widely on the lower (abaxial) surface of the frond.

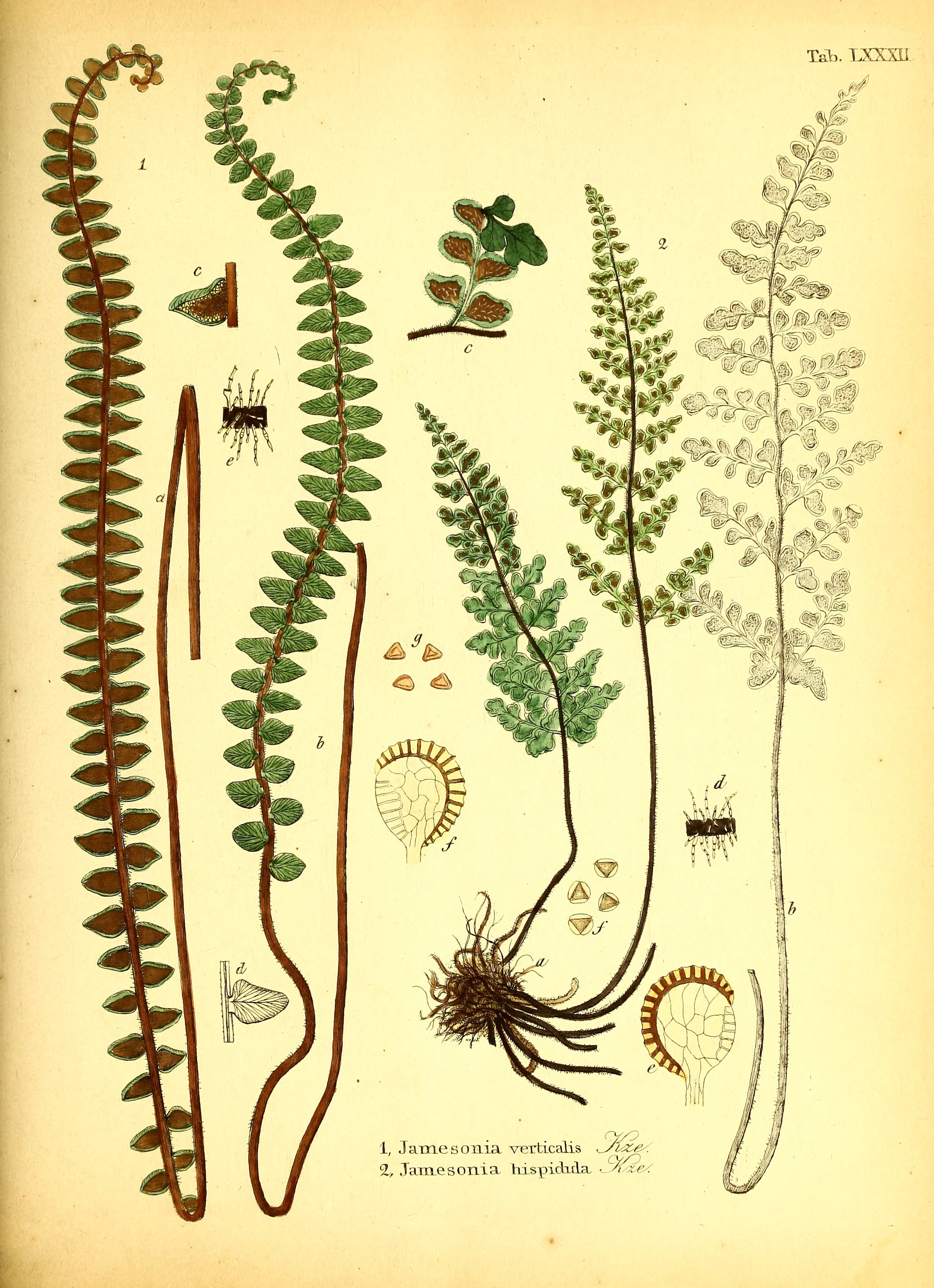
Botanical illustration of Jamesonia verticalis and Jamesonia hispidula (syn. Eriosorus hispidulus); the first with "Jamesonia-type" morphology, the second with "Eriosorus-type" morphology

== Taxonomy ==
The genus Jamesonia was first described by William Jackson Hooker and Robert Kaye Greville in 1830, initially with one species, Jamesonia pulchra. The genus name of Jamesonia was in honour of William Jameson (1796–1873), who was a Scottish-Ecuadorian botanist. The genus Eriosorus, proposed by Antoine Fée in 1852, was recognized as closely related, both genera being placed in the taenitidoid group of the subfamily Pteridoideae. A molecular phylogenetic study in 2004 showed that neither genus was monophyletic on its own, but that together they formed a clade. Subsequent classifications have treated the two as a single genus, Jamesonia. A further study in 2015 showed that the genus Nephopteris with the sole species N. maxonii belonged in the same clade. It is now also included in Jamesonia.

== Phylogeny ==
Within the subfamily Pteridoideae, Jamesonia forms a clade with five other genera, the so-called "JAPSTT" clade, which is one of four major clades within the subfamily Pteridoideae identified in a 2017 study.

External phylogeny

- JAPSTT clade
  - Jamesonia
  - - Pterozonium
    - - Tryonia
      - - Taenitis
        - - Syngramma
          - Austrogramme

Internal phylogeny

- Jamesonia
  - J. osteniana (Dutra) Gastony
  - - - - J. blepharum A.F.Tryon
        - - J. cinnamomea Kunze
          - J. verticalis Kunze
      - - - J. goudotii C.Chr.
          - - J. congesta (Christ) Christenh.
            - J. warscewiczii (Mett.) Christenh.
        - - J. novogranatensis (A.F.Tryon) Christenh.
          - - J. rufescens (Fée) Christenh.
            - - J. peruviana A.F.Tryon
              - - J. longipetiolata (Hieron.) Christenh.
                - J. setulosa (Hieron.) Christenh.
    - - - - J. rotundifolia Fée
          - J. scammaniae A.F.Tryon
        - - - J. brasiliensis Christ
            - - J. alstonii A.F.Tryon
              - J. canescens (Klotzsch) Kunze
          - - - J. bogotensis H.Karst.
              - J. insignis (Kuhn) Christenh.
            - - J. imbricata (Cav.) Hook. & Grev.
              - - J. laxa Kuntze
                - J. pulchra Hook. & Grev.
      - - J. maxonii (Lellinger) Pabón-Mora & F.González
        - - J. hirta (Kunth) Christenh.
          - - - J. cheilanthoides (Sw.) Christenh.
              - J. xelongata J.Sm.
            - - J. flexuosa (Humb. & Bonpl.) Christenh.
              - - - J. cuatrecasasii A.F.Tryon
                  - J. hispidula Kunze
                - - J. hirsutula (Mett.) Christenh.
                  - J. lindigii (Mett.) Christenh.

Other species:

- J. accrescens (A.F.Tryon) Christenh.
- J. angusta (M.Kessler & A.R.Sm.) Christenh.
- J. ascendens (A.R.Sm. & M.Kessler) Christenh.
- J. aureonitens (Hook.) Christenh.
- J. auriculata A.F.Tryon
- J. biardii (Fée) Christenh.
- J. boliviensis A.F.Tryon
- J. caracasana (Baker) Christenh.
- J. ceracea Maxon
- J. chiapensis (Maxon) Christenh.
- J. crespiana Bosco
- J. erecta Rojas
- J. ewanii (A.F.Tryon) Christenh.
- J. feei (Copel.) Christenh.
- J. flabellata (Hook. & Grev.) Christenh.
- J. galeana (Tryon) Rojas
- J. glaberrima (Maxon) Christenh.
- J. glandulifera (Hieronymus) Rojas
- J. ×incognita (Gómez) {Jamesonia warscewiczii x Jamesonia alstonii}
- J. ×intermedia Della & Prado {Jamesonia biardii x Jamesonia insignis}
- J. ×kupperi (Losch) Feng & Huang {Jamesonia scammaniae x Jamesonia warscewiczii}
- J. ×lasseri (Vareschi) Feng & Huang {Jamesonia flexuosa x Jamesonia paucifolia}
- J. lechleri (Kuhn) Christenh.
- J. ×longifolia (Baker) Feng & Huang {Jamesonia brasiliensis x Jamesonia cheilanthoides}
- J. madidiensis (M.Kessler & A.R.Sm.) Christenh.
- J. mathewsii (Hook.) Christenh.
- J. orbignyana (Kuhn) Christenh.
- J. panamensis Rojas
- J. paucifolia (A.C.Sm.) Christenh.
- J. refracta (Kunze ex Klotzsch) Rojas
- J. retroflexa Rojas
- J. retrofracta (Greville & Hooker) Rojas
- J. robusta H.Karst.
- J. ×rollaliciana (Gómez) {Jamesonia warscewiczii x Jamesonia rotundifolia}
- J. scalaris Kunze
- J. stuebelii (Hieron.) Christenh.
- J. vellea (A.F.Tryon) Christenh.
- J. wurdackii (A.F.Tryon) Christenh.

== Bibliography ==
- Pichi-Sermolli, Rodolfo E. G. (1977). "Fragmenta Pteridologiae—VI". Webbia. 31 (1): 242. Bibcode:1977Webbi..31..237P. doi:10.1080/00837792.1977.10670073. ISSN 0083-7792.
- Schuettpelz, Eric; Schneider, Harald; Huiet, Layne; Windham, Michael D.; Pryer, Kathleen M. (2007). "A molecular phylogeny of the fern family Pteridaceae: Assessing overall relationships and the affinities of previously unsampled genera" (PDF). Molecular Phylogenetics and Evolution. 44 (3): 1172–1185. Bibcode:2007MolPE..44.1172S. doi:10.1016/j.ympev.2007.04.011. ISSN 1055-7903. PMID 17570688. Archived from the original (PDF) on 2008-08-20.
- Tryon, Alice F. (1962). "A monograph of the fern genus Jamesonia". Contributions from the Gray Herbarium of Harvard University. 191: 109–197. doi:10.5962/p.336405. JSTOR 41764668.
- Tryon, Alice F. (1970). "A monograph of the fern genus Eriosorus". Contributions from the Gray Herbarium of Harvard University. 200 (200): 54–174. doi:10.5962/p.336423. JSTOR 41764694.
