= Silver fern (disambiguation) =

Silver fern is a species of tree fern.

Silver fern may also refer to:

- Certain fern species in the genus Pityrogramma
- Pityrogramma calomelanos, a fern from Mexico and Tropical America
- NZR RM class (Silver Fern), a class of New Zealand railcars
- Silver fern flag, an alternative flag of New Zealand
- Silver Ferns, the New Zealand national netball team
