= Kaempferitrin =

- Kaempferitrin structure

Names
- IUPAC name 4′,5-Dihydroxy-3,7-bis(α-L-rhamnopyranosyloxy)flavone
- Systematic IUPAC name 5-Hydroxy-2-(4-hydroxyphenyl)-3,7-bis{[(2S,3R,4R,5R,6S)-3,4,5-trihydroxy-6-methyloxan-2-yl]oxy}-4H-1-benzopyran-4-one
- Other names Lespenefril; Lespenephryl; Lespedin lespenephril Kaempferol 3,7-dirhamnoside Kaempferol 3,7 bisrhamnoside

Identifiers
CAS Number	482-38-2
3D model (JSmol)	Interactive image
ChEBI	CHEBI:68883
ChEMBL	ChEMBL251766
ChemSpider	4588900
KEGG	C16981
PubChem CID	5486199
UNII	VPV01U3R59
CompTox Dashboard (EPA)	DTXSID90197458
- InChI: InChI=1S/C27H30O14/c1-9-17(30)20(33)22(35)26(37-9)39-13-7-14(29)16-15(8-13)40-24(11-3-5-12(28)6-4-11)25(19(16)32)41-27-23(36)21(34)18(31)10(2)38-27/h3-10,17-18,20-23,26-31,33-36H,1-2H3/t9-,10-,17-,18-,20+,21+,22+,23+,26-,27-/m0/s1 Key: PUPKKEQDLNREIM-QNSQPKOQSA-N
- SMILES: CC1C(C(C(C(O1)OC2=CC(=C3C(=C2)OC(=C(C3=O)OC4C(C(C(C(O4)C)O)O)O)C5=CC=C(C=C5)O)O)O)O)O

Properties
Chemical formula	C_{27}H_{30}O_{14}
Molar mass	578.52 g/mol
Density	1.7 g/mL
- Except where otherwise noted, data are given for materials in their standard state (at 25 °C [77 °F], 100 kPa). verify (what is ?) Infobox references

Kaempferitrin is an organic chemical compound. It can be isolated from the leaves of Hedyotis verticillata and from Onychium japonicum.

Kaempferitrin is the 3,7-dirhamnoside of kaempferol.
