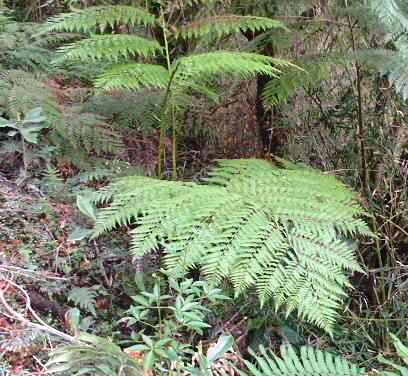

Scientific classification
- Kingdom: Plantae
- Clade: Tracheophytes
- Division: Polypodiophyta
- Class: Polypodiopsida
- Order: Cyatheales
- Family: Dicksoniaceae
- Genus: Lophosoria
- Species: L. quadripinnata

Binomial name
- Lophosoria quadripinnata (J.F.Gmel.) C.Chr.

Synonyms
- Alsophila affinis (C.Presl) Fée; Alsophila bilineata Sodiro; Alsophila christii Sodiro; Alsophila deckeriana Klotzsch; Alsophila glauca (Sw.) Urb.; Alsophila millefolium Desv.; Alsophila monticola Mart.; Alsophila pruinata (Sw.) Kaulf.; Alsophila quadripinnata (J.F.Gmel.) C.Chr.; Alsophila schaffneriana Fée; Cyathea bilineata (Sodiro) Domin; Cyathea discolor Bory; Cyathea monticola C.Presl; Cyathea quadripinnata (J.F.Gmel.) Domin; Cyathea schaffneriana (Fée) Domin; Lophosoria acaulis Fée; Lophosoria affinis C.Presl; Lophosoria brasiliensis Klotzsch; Lophosoria caesia Fée; Lophosoria densa (Liebm.) Klotzsch; Lophosoria discolor C.Presl; Lophosoria excisa Fée; Lophosoria frigida (Liebm.) Klotzsch\n; Lophosoria glauca Kuhn; Lophosoria glaucescens (Liebm.) Klotzsch; Lophosoria polypodioides C.Presl; Lophosoria prostrata Fée; Lophosoria pruinata (Sw.) C.Presl; Lophosoria schaffneriana (Fée) E.Fourn.; Lophosoria warscewiczii Klotzsch ex E.Fourn.; Polypodium caesium C.Presl; Polypodium cinereum Cav.; Polypodium glaucum Sw.; Polypodium griseum Schkuhr; Polypodium maculatum Spreng.; Polypodium pruinatum Sw.; Polypodium quadripinnatum J.F.Gmel.; Trichosorus densus Liebm.; Trichosorus frigidus Liebm.; Trichosorus glaucescens Liebm.

= Lophosoria quadripinnata =

Species of fern

Lophosoria quadripinnata (J.F.Gmel.) C.Chr. is a species of fern that, according to DNA molecular analysis, belongs to the family Dicksoniaceae, where it is placed in the genus Lophosoria. It is found in the Americas spanning from Cuba and Mexico to Chile. In Chile it is present in the area between Talca and Aysén including Juan Fernández Islands. In Argentina it grows only in the humid valleys of western Neuquén and Río Negro Province. Diamondleaf fern is a common name. In Spanish it is known as 'ampe' (from the Mapudungun añpe) or palmilla, but one has to remember that there are several species of ferns called "palmillas" that have larger or smaller fronds, and which grow in colder climates. It is a medium-sized plant, growing to about 4–5 feet (though 10–12 feet in a sheltered place at Arduaine Garden in Argyll, Scotland) and even though the rhizome does not grow a trunk, it is clearly related to the other tree ferns due to features that were apparently already present in their common ancestor, like 'pneumathodes', and the rhizome which changed from the dorsiventral symmetry typical of the other ferns, to a radial symmetry typical of tree ferns. Their large and multiple pinnate fronds, with the petiole raised adaxially, and the hairs on the rhizome and lower part of the petioles, also resemble those of tree ferns. To identify the species, use the position and characteristics of the spores found on the fertile fronds. The genus already existed in the Cretaceous Period in southern Gondwana according to fossil remains found in Antarctica. The species is well known as an ornamental plant.

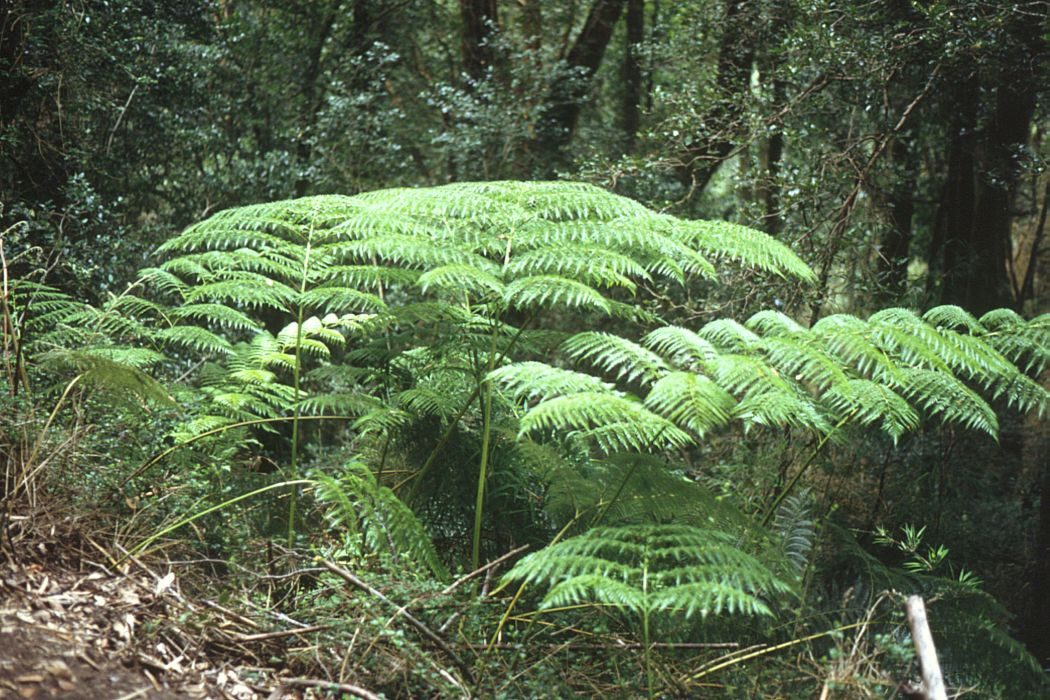
Habitat of Lophosoria quadripinnata

== Description ==
Lophosoria quadripinnata is a vascular plant with two alternating generations, a sporophyte and a gametophyte, multicellular and independent; with spores as a means of dispersion and survival. The gametophyte is a "thallus" (undifferentiated tissue), and the sporophyte is a "corm" (with roots, shoots, and a vascular system). Due to these characteristics it is usually classified as a "pteridophyte". They have sporophytes with megaphylls or "fronds" (Euphyllophytina).

The rhizome is massive, with hairs, not growing a trunk (not arborescent), and with radial symmetry instead of horizontal; a characteristic apparently originating in the ancestor of the tree ferns. The fronds are large in size, 2-3 pinnations, with hairs on the under side of the petioles, and they are high on its abaxial part, all common characteristics of the Cyatheales order (the tree ferns clade). Also present are the pneumathodes (discrete vent lines, or patches, present on the rachis, petiole and rhizome, whose function is facilitating gas exchange in the dense tissue), which are characteristic of the tree fern clade.

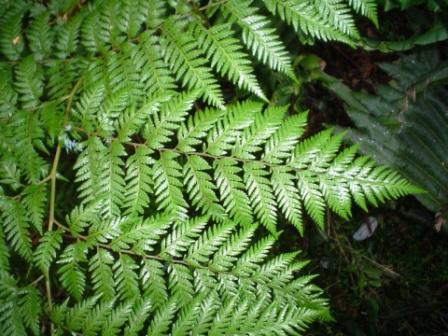
Details of the adaxial face of the frond of Lophosoria quadripinnata

The sori, without indusia (covering), are located on the abaxial (lower) surface, on the veins of the last pinnae. The leaf margin does not form part of an indusium, as in other Dicksoniaceae. The sori have numerous hairs (called "filiform paraphyses") between the sporangia. The characteristics and position of the sori are unique and can be used to identify the species.

Like all Polypodiopsidas, the sporangia are leptosporangiate (with a foot, capsule with a single-cell wall thickness, and dehiscent ring in the capsule). As in all the tree ferns, the ring is oblique and complete, not interrupted by the foot of the sporangium. The spores have trilete marks. This species has spores with a very unusual morphology, with a central belt ("cincture") that meant for a long time the species was assigned its own family, Lophosoriaceae.

The germination of the gametophyte corresponds to the genus Cyathea, giving rise to short strands of from two to six cells in both varieties. The prothallus development is of the Adiantum type. When raised in the laboratory, gametophytes of the quadripinnata variety are always chordates, however gametophytes of the contracta variety possess three morphs, depending on the density of spores that are developed (Dyer 1979). At low density, they are long spatulates with a central meristem and a slightly more developed wing than the other; at medium densities they are cordiforms and at high densities are band-like with a large amount of antheridia.

The gametophyte is protandric (a hermaphrodite, first antheridia are developed that give antherozoids, and then the archegonia that gives the oospheres). The number of x chromosomes = 65.

== Taxonomy ==
Theoretical introduction to Phylogenetics and Taxonomy

Genetic analysis has placed the species unequivocally in the family Dicksoniaceae, but the story of its taxonomic placement is long. Pichi Sermolli (1970) placed it in its own family, Lophosoriaceae Pichi Sermolli, where it was located for a long time. At first it was thought to be a relation of the Cyatheaceae because of the characteristic abaxial sori, or the pattern of gametophyte germination. In the 1990s a close relationship was hypothesized with Metaxyaceae because of characteristics of the petiole and stem morphology but subsequent analyzes suggested that these families were not related (D. S. Conant, unpublished data, cited in Wolf et al. 1999). On the other hand, ultrastructural studies (using scanning electron microscopy) of the spores (Gastony y Tyron 1976) and recent studies of gametophyte development (Pérez-García et al. 1995) have concluded that Lophosoria differs significantly from the characteristics of other tree ferns, so their relationship to the others remains unknown.

Other researchers, such as Kubitzki in Kramer (1990) have it nested within Dicksoniaceae along with other genera that today are classified in other families of tree ferns. As molecular studies of the species continued, there was an increasingly obvious affinity with the family Dicksoniaceae, such as having the same number of chromosomes, and molecular DNA analysis done on rbcL sequence in 1999 also placed it within that family (Wolf et al. 1999), a relationship that was confirmed in an extensive molecular study of ferns made by Korall et al. (2006, on the sequences atpA, atpB, rps4 and the aforementioned). Because of that the species was placed in the family Dicksoniaceae in its own monotypic genus in Smith's 2006 classification system of monilophytes.

Circumscription: the species consists of at least two varieties, sometimes placed as species of the genus:

- Lophosoria quadripinnata (J.F.Gmel.) C.Chr. variety quadripinnata
  - wide distribution in the tropical parts of the Americas, from the mild and humid regions of South America, between 1000 and 3000 meters above sea level
- Lophosoria quadripinnata variety contracta (Hieron.) R.M.Tryon & A.F.Tryon
  - found in Ecuador, at 2900 meters above sea level, and on Robinson Crusoe Island, Juan Fernandez Archipelago, Chile

The spores of the contracta variety are slightly bigger (70 x 75 μm) than those of the quadripinnata variety (50 × 60 μm). Furthermore, the quadripinnata variety's antheridia are made up of 5 cells: 2 baseline, 2 annular, and a small elliptical operculum, while those of the variety contracta are formed by three cells, one basal an annular and operculum (Stockey 1930). They also differ in the morphology of their gametophytes.

Another variety Lophosoria quadripinnata variety quesadae A.Rojas has also been described in Costa Rica and Panama (Rojas-Alvarado 1996, it was described as Lophosoria quesadae species).

== Evolution ==
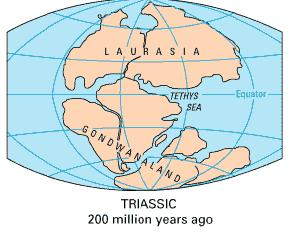
Lophosoria apparently originated in the early Cretaceous Period, on the southern continent of Gondwana, and existed when the continent split in the late Cretaceous Period.

Dettmann (1986) has remarked that the spores of the extinct genus Cyatheacidites correspond very well with living Lophosoria. The distribution of the Cyatheacidites has been used to infer that Lophosoria was located in the southern part of Gondwana during the Early Cretaceous Period, and then migrated to Australia and South America (Dettmann 1986).

More recently, Cantrill (1998) described fossilized leaves in the early Cretaceous layer (more specifically in the Aptian) in Antarctica, which contained spores of Cyatheacidites. The preservation of the leaves and spores was so good that Cantrill could identify the species, and described them by the name of Lophosoria cupulata D.J.Cantrill (published as Lophosoria cupulatus) with the genus change, as he considered Lophosoria quadripinnata (J.F.Gmel.) C.Chr. was the living species more closely related to the species found.

== Economic importance ==
It is used as an ornamental plant in parks and gardens, as well as cut foliage in flower bouquets. The plants used in latter are removed from their natural environment, creating certain local conservation issues. Some local markets in the south of Chile sell their sprouts, called perritos, for consuming in salads.
