= Radiata (disambiguation) =

Radiata may refer to:

- Radiata, the radially symmetric animals of the Eumetazoa subkingdom
- Radiata, a synonym of the legume genus Medicago
- Radiata Stories, a 2005 action role-playing game for the PlayStation 2
- Corona radiata, in neuroanatomy, a white matter sheet that continues caudally as the internal capsule and rostrally as the centrum semiovale
- Corona radiata (embryology), a structure that surrounds an ovum or unfertilized egg cell, and consist of two or three strata (layers) of follicular cells

== As a species name ==
- Actiniopteris radiata, a widely distributed fern occurring throughout Africa and adjacent islands, Madagascar, Arabia, Iran, Afghanistan, Nepal, India, Sri Lanka, Burma and Australia
- Astropyga radiata, a sea urchin found in the Indo-Pacific region
- Cellana radiata, a species of predatory sea snail
- Ecklonia radiata a species of kelp found in the Canary Islands, the Cape Verde Islands, Madagascar, Mauritania, Senegal, South Africa, Oman, southern Australia, Lord Howe Island, and New Zealand
- Eucalyptus radiata, a medium to tall tree to 30 m high
- Habenaria radiata, a species of orchid endemic to China, Japan, Korea and Russia
- Hydrangea radiata, a deciduous shrub up to 3 m tall naturally occurring in the southern Appalachians of the United States
- Lycoris radiata, a bulbous perennial in the amaryllis family
- Macaca radiata, or the bonnet macaque, a macaque endemic to southern India
- Neriene radiata, or the filmy dome spider, a sheet weaver
- Pinctada radiata, a species of pearl oyster distributed throughout the Indo-Pacific
- Pinus radiata, a species of pine native to the Central Coast of California
- Pterois radiata, a carnivorous, ray-finned fish with venomous spines that lives in the Indian and western Pacific oceans
- Temnora radiata, a moth of the family Sphingidae found from West Africa to Angola
- Utricularia radiata, a medium-sized suspended aquatic carnivorous plant
