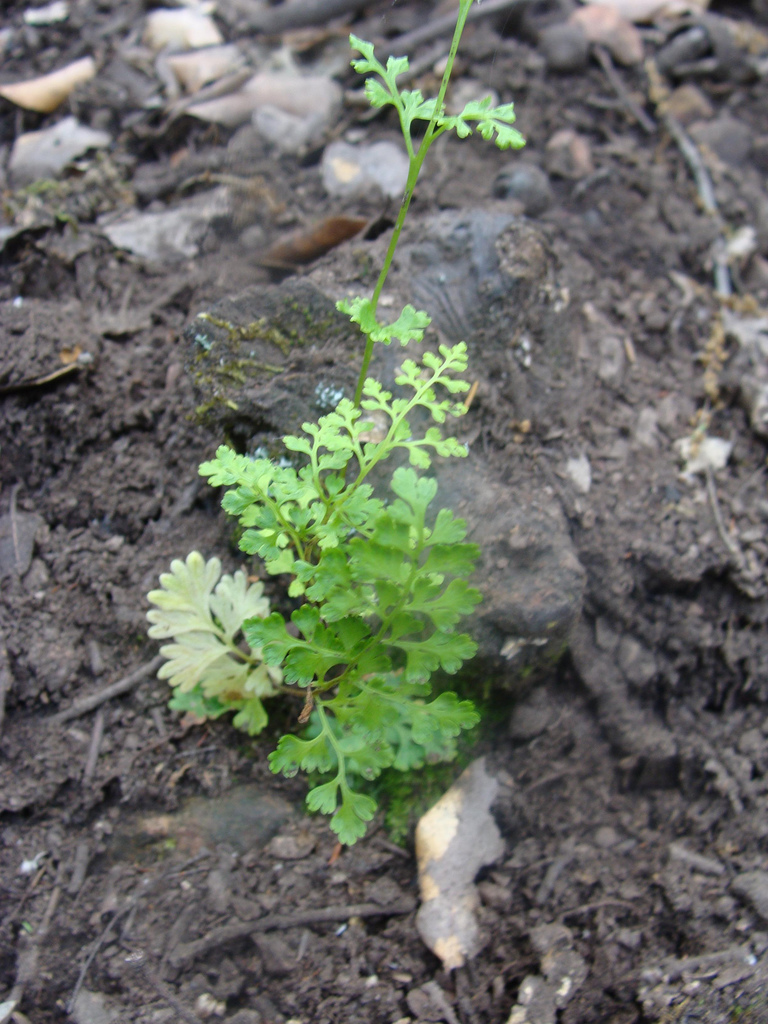
- Anogramma leptophylla

Scientific classification
- Kingdom: Plantae
- Clade: Tracheophytes
- Division: Polypodiophyta
- Class: Polypodiopsida
- Order: Polypodiales
- Family: Pteridaceae
- Subfamily: Pteridoideae; C.Chr. ex Crabbe, Jermy & Mickel

Genera
- See text.

= Pteridoideae =

Subfamily of ferns

Pteridoideae is one of the five subfamilies of the fern family Pteridaceae. This subfamily contains about 14 genera and around 400 species.

== Taxonomy ==
=== Phylogeny ===
The following diagram shows a likely phylogenic relationship between Pteridoideae and the other the Pteridaceae subfamilies.

- Pteridaceae
  - Cryptogrammoideae
  - - - Parkerioideae (syn. Ceratopteridoideae)
      - Pteridoideae
    - - Cheilanthoideae
      - Vittarioideae

The cladogram below shows one hypothesis for the evolutionary relationships among the genera of the Pteridoideae, based on a maximum likelihood analysis using six plastid markers. The authors of the study identified four major clades. The Pteris and JAPSTT clades are found worldwide; the GAPCC clade is pantropical; and the Actiniopteris+Onychium clade is restricted to the Old World.

- Pteridoideae
  - Pteris clade
    Pteris
  - - Actiniopteris+Onychium clade
      - Actiniopteris
      - Onychium
    - - GAPCC clade
        - - Gastoniella
          - - Cerosora
            - Pityrogramma
        - - Cosentinia
          - Anogramma
      - JAPSTT clade
        - Jamesonia
        - - Pterozonium
          - - Tryonia
            - - Taenitis
              - - Syngramma
                - Austrogramme

=== Genera ===
The Pteridophyte Phylogeny Group classification of 2016 (PPG I) recognized 13 genera. Shortly afterwards, the genus Gastoniella was created for three species formerly placed in Anogramma which a molecular phylogenetic analysis had shown to be distinct.

- Actiniopteris Link
- Anogramma Link
- Austrogramme E.Fourn.
- Cerosora Domin
- Cosentinia Tod.
- Gastoniella Li Bing Zhang & Liang Zhang
- Jamesonia Hook. & Grev.
- Onychium Kaulf.
- Pityrogramma Link
- Pteris L.
- Pterozonium Fée
- Syngramma J.Sm.
- Taenitis Willd. ex Schkuhr
- Tryonia Schuettp.
