= H. verticillata =

H. verticillata may refer to:

- Hedyotis verticillata, a plant species
- Hydrilla verticillata, the Esthwaite waterweed or hydrilla, an aquatic plant species
