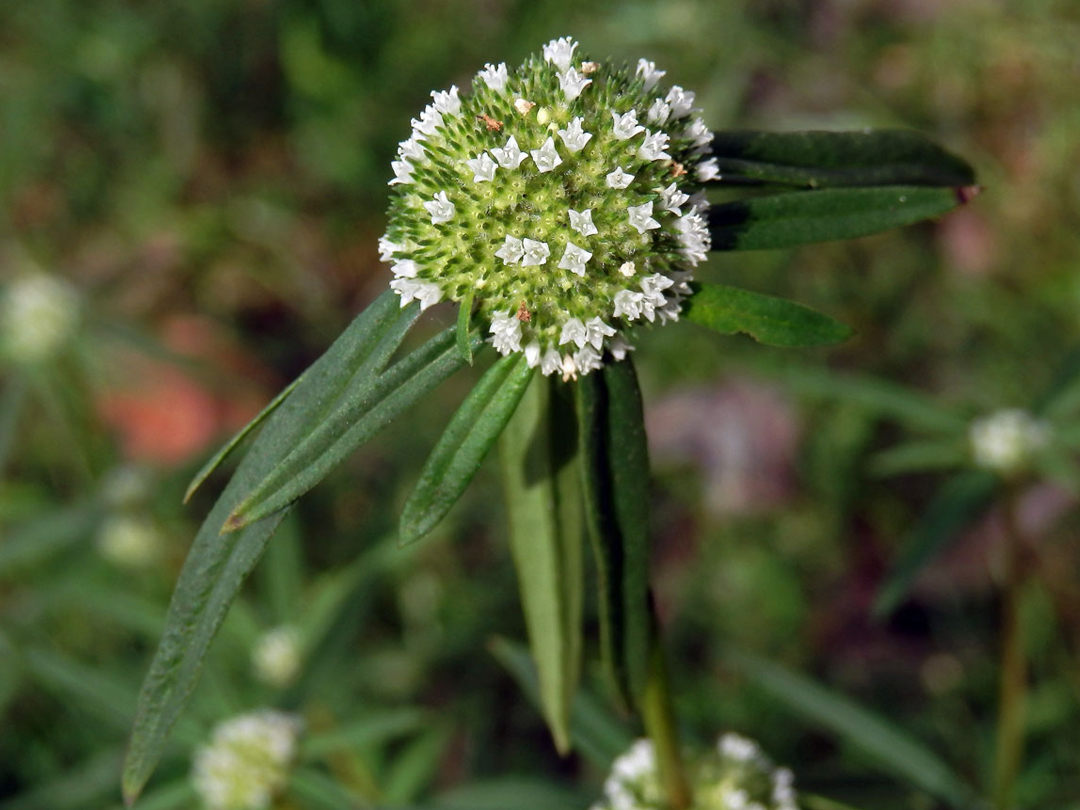
- Scleromitrion verticillatum

Scientific classification
- Kingdom: Plantae
- Clade: Tracheophytes
- Clade: Angiosperms
- Clade: Eudicots
- Clade: Asterids
- Order: Gentianales
- Family: Rubiaceae
- Subfamily: Rubioideae
- Tribe: Spermacoceae
- Genus: Scleromitrion (Wight & Arn.) Meisn.

Species
- See text.

Synonyms
- Hedyotis sect. Scleromitrion

= Scleromitrion =

Genus of flowering plants

Scleromitrion is a genus of flowering plants in the family Rubiaceae, native to tropical and subtropical Asia and the western Pacific. The genus was first established in 1834 as a section of the genus Hedyotis, H. sect. Scleromitrion, and was raised to a full genus in 1838.

== Species ==
As of January 2023, Plants of the World Online accepted the following species:

- Scleromitrion angustifolium (Cham. & Schltdl.) Benth.
- Scleromitrion brachypodum (DC.) T.C.Hsu
- Scleromitrion capitatum Miq.
- Scleromitrion delicatum (Halford) K.L.Gibbons
- Scleromitrion diffusum (Willd.) R.J.Wang
- Scleromitrion galioides (F.Muell.) K.L.Gibbons
- Scleromitrion gibsonii (Halford) K.L.Gibbons
- Scleromitrion gracilipes (Craib) Neupane & N.Wikstr.
- Scleromitrion intonsum (Halford) K.L.Gibbons
- Scleromitrion kerrii (Craib) Wangwasit & Chantar.
- Scleromitrion koanum (R.J.Wang) R.J.Wang
- Scleromitrion laceyi (Halford) K.L.Gibbons
- Scleromitrion largiflorens (Halford) K.L.Gibbons
- Scleromitrion leptocaule (Halford) K.L.Gibbons
- Scleromitrion linoides (Griff.) Neupane & N.Wikstr.
- Scleromitrion pauciflorum (Bartl. ex DC.) Miq.
- Scleromitrion pinifolium (Wall. ex G.Don) R.J.Wang
- Scleromitrion polycladum (F.Muell.) K.L.Gibbons
- Scleromitrion scleranthoides (F.Muell.) K.L.Gibbons
- Scleromitrion sirayanum T.C.Hsu & Z.H.Chen
- Scleromitrion subulatum (Korth.) K.L.Gibbons
- Scleromitrion tenelliflorum (Blume) Korth.
- Scleromitrion tenuifolium (Burm.f.) K.L.Gibbons
- Scleromitrion thysanotum (Halford) K.L.Gibbons
- Scleromitrion verticillatum (L.) R.J.Wang
