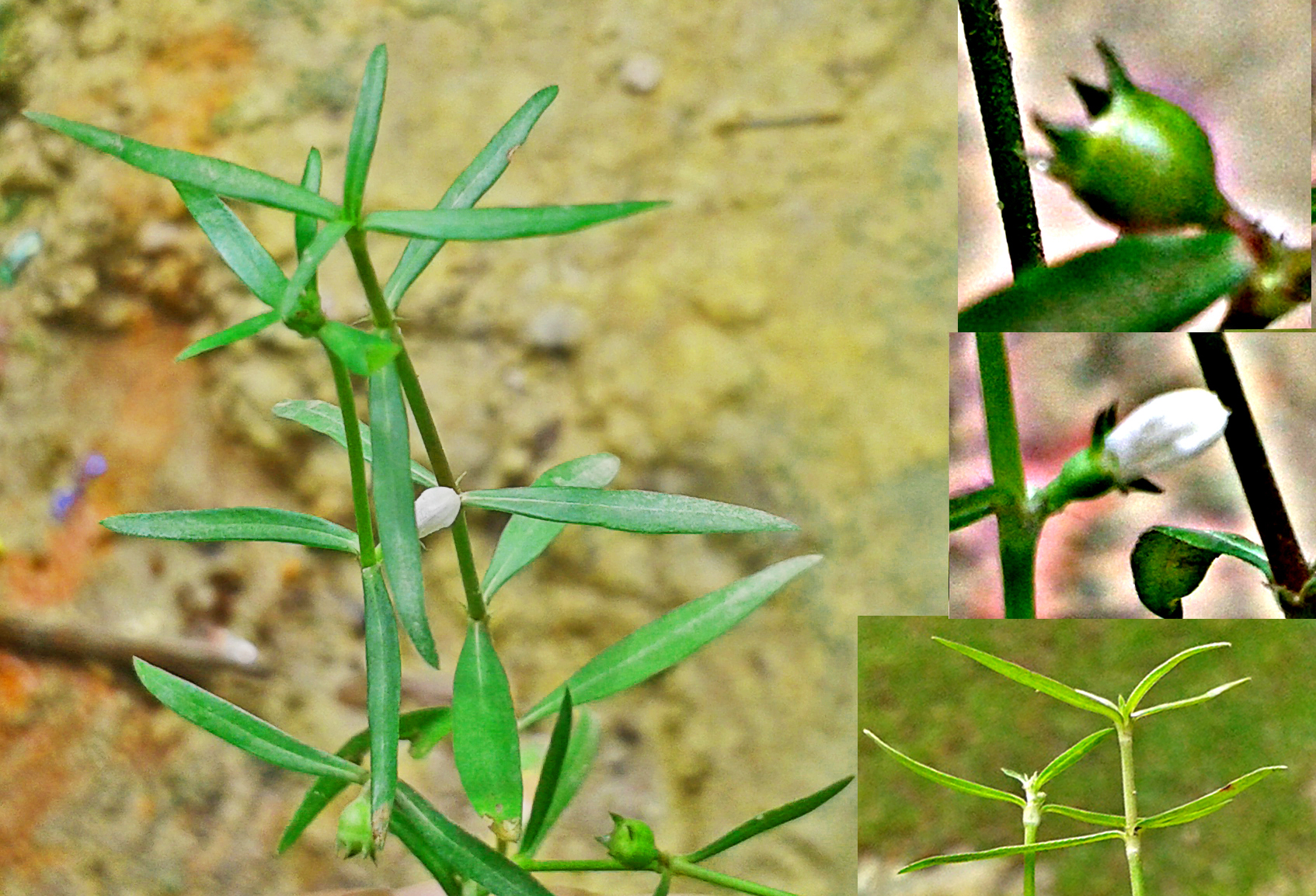

Scientific classification
- Kingdom: Plantae
- Clade: Tracheophytes
- Clade: Angiosperms
- Clade: Eudicots
- Clade: Asterids
- Order: Gentianales
- Family: Rubiaceae
- Genus: Scleromitrion
- Species: S. diffusum

Binomial name
- Scleromitrion diffusum (Willd.) R.J.Wang

Synonyms
- Hedyotis diffusa Willd.; Oldenlandia diffusa (Willd.) Roxb.

= Scleromitrion diffusum =

Species of plant

Scleromitrion diffusum, synonyms including Hedyotis diffusa, is a species of flowering plant in the family Rubiaceae. It is a herb used in traditional Chinese medicine, known as Chinese: 白花蛇舌草; pinyin: báihuā shéshécǎo; lit. 'white flower snake-tongue grass', sometimes abbreviated to 蛇舌草 shéshécǎo. It is sometimes combined with Siraitia grosvenorii (simplified Chinese: 罗汉果; traditional Chinese: 羅漢果; pinyin: luóhànguǒ) and Scutellaria barbata (Chinese: 半枝莲) to make hot drinks like lohoguo of guongsei (simplified Chinese: 罗汉果蛇舌草精; traditional Chinese: 羅漢果蛇舌草精; pinyin: luóhànguǒ shéshécǎo jīng) or luohanguo pearl and sheshecao beverage.

== Taxonomy ==
There is considerable confusion over the application of the name Hedyotis diffusa Willd. and its synonyms. In the sense used in the Flora of China, and in much research on the phytochemistry, pharmacology and potential medical applications of the species, Hedyotis diffusa refers to a plant with solitary-flowered (or at most two- or three-flowered) inflorescences. In 1990, a herbarium specimen of a plant with different form of inflorescence was chosen as the lectotype. In 2021, it was proposed that the name Hedyotis diffusa should be conserved, based on a one-flowered specimen as the type. Synonyms of Hedyotis diffusa then include Oldenlandia diffusa (Willd.) Roxb. and Scleromitrion diffusum (Willd.) R.J.Wang. These are the homotypic synonyms accepted by Plants of the World Online as of March 2023, which treated the taxon as Scleromitrion diffusum.

== Distribution ==
Wild Scleromitrion diffusum is native to tropical and subtropical Asia.
