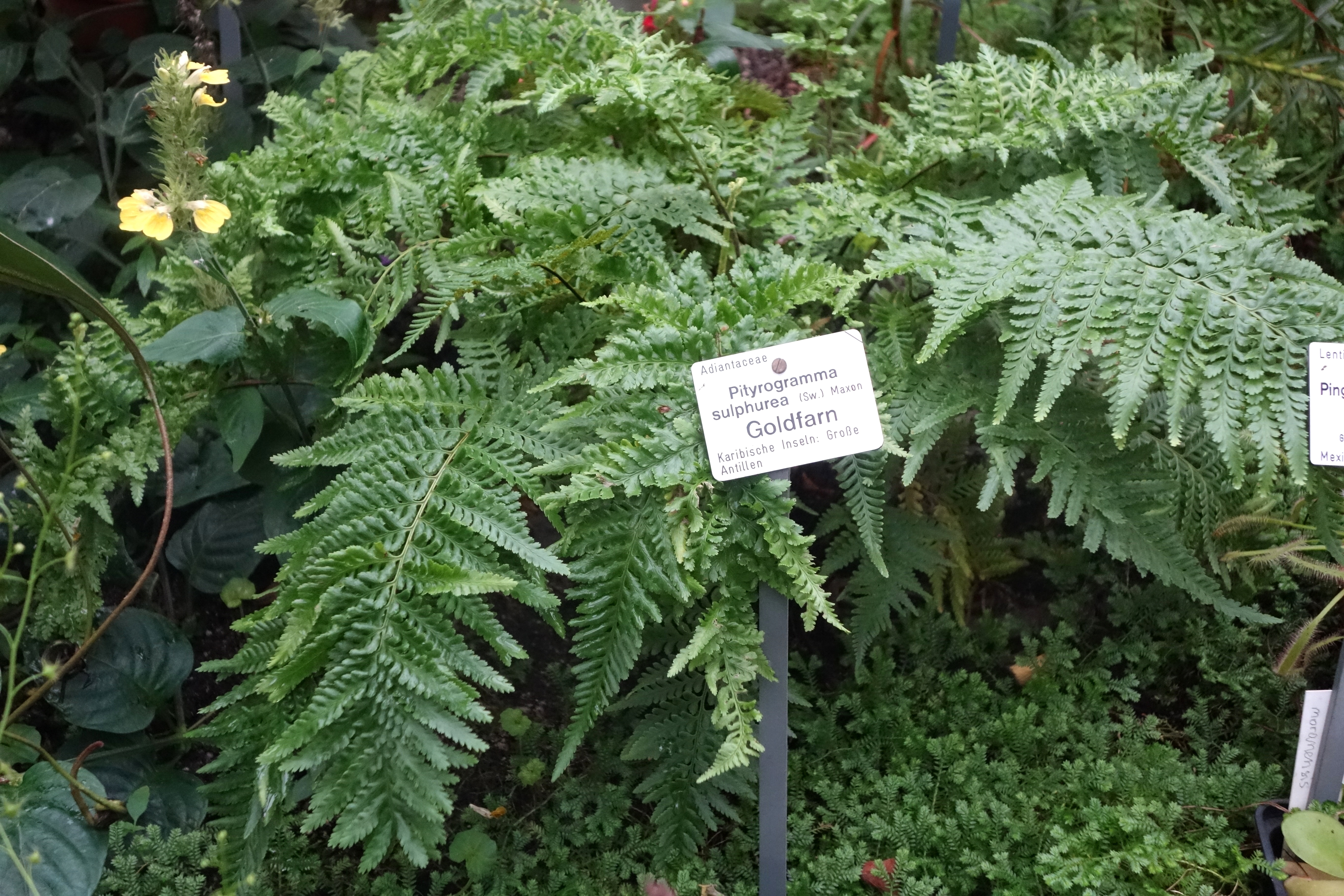

Scientific classification
- Kingdom: Plantae
- Clade: Tracheophytes
- Division: Polypodiophyta
- Class: Polypodiopsida
- Order: Polypodiales
- Family: Pteridaceae
- Genus: Pityrogramma
- Species: P. sulphurea

Binomial name
- Pityrogramma sulphurea (Sw.) Maxon

= Pityrogramma sulphurea =

Species of fern

Pityrogramma sulphurea, the Jamaican goldback fern, is a fern, endemic to the West Indies and naturalized in Sri Lanka.

== Synonyms ==
- Acrostichum sulphureum Sw.
- Ceropteris sulphurea (Sw.) Fée
- Gymnogramma sulphurea (Sw.) Desv.
