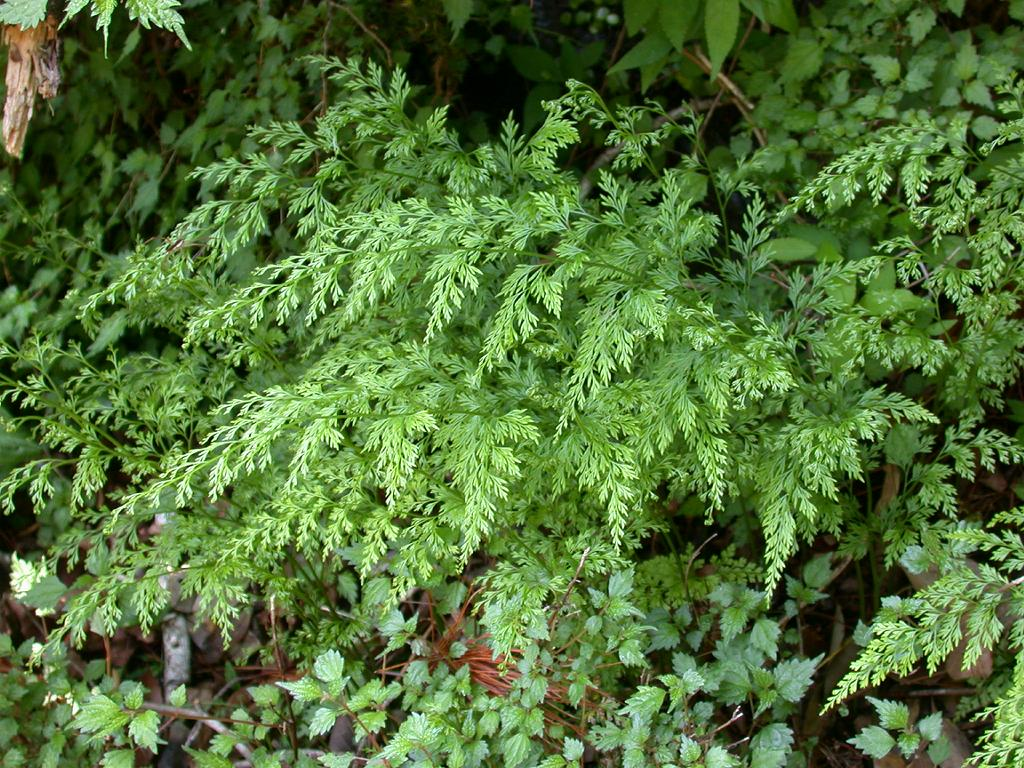
- Onychium japonicum growing in Japan

Scientific classification
- Kingdom: Plantae
- Clade: Tracheophytes
- Division: Polypodiophyta
- Class: Polypodiopsida
- Order: Polypodiales
- Family: Pteridaceae
- Subfamily: Pteridoideae
- Genus: Onychium; Kaulf.

Type species
- Onychium capense Kaulf.

Species
- See text

Synonyms
- Leptostegia Don

= Onychium =

Genus of ferns

Onychium is a genus of ferns in the subfamily Pteridoideae of the family Pteridaceae.

== Phylogeny ==
As of December 2019, the Checklist of Ferns and Lycophytes of the World recognized the following species and hybrids:

Nitta et al. 2022 and Fern Tree of life

- Onychium
  - - O. siliculosum (Desv.) C.Chr.
    - O. tenuifrons Ching
  - - O. cryptogrammoides Christ
    - - O. plumosum Ching
      - - O. moupinense Ching
        - - O. japonicum (Thunb.) Kunze (Japanese claw fern, carrot fern)
          - O. lucidum (D.Don) Spreng.

Other species include:
- O. divaricatum (Poir.) Alston
- O. kholianum Fraser-Jenk. & S.Matsumoto
- O. ×matsumotoi Fraser-Jenk. & Kandel
- O. vermae Fraser-Jenk. & Khullar
