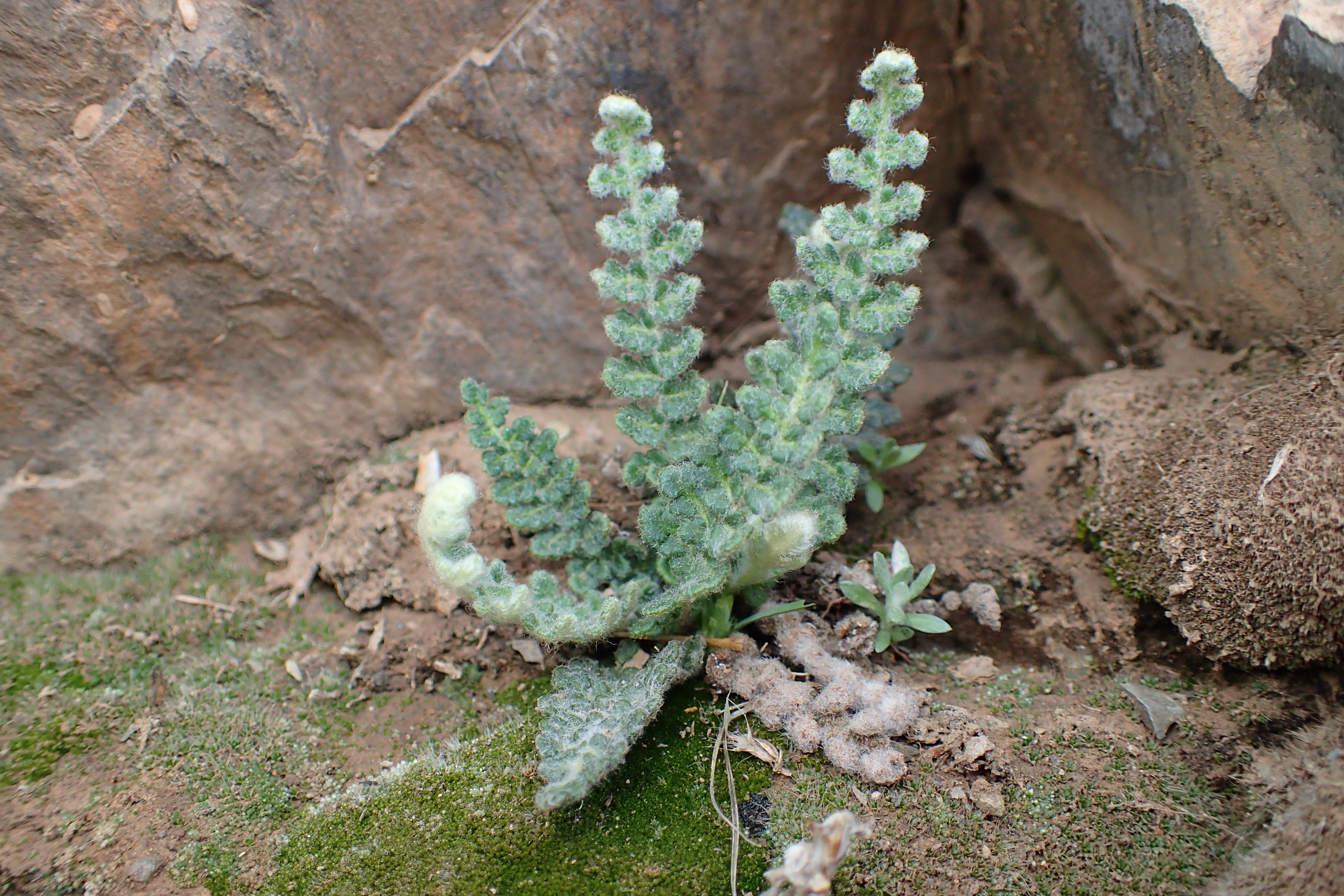
- In Morocco

Scientific classification
- Kingdom: Plantae
- Clade: Tracheophytes
- Division: Polypodiophyta
- Class: Polypodiopsida
- Order: Polypodiales
- Family: Pteridaceae
- Subfamily: Pteridoideae
- Genus: Cosentinia; Tod.
- Species: C. vellea

Binomial name
- Cosentinia vellea (Aiton) Tod.

Subspecies
- See text

Synonyms
- Cheilanthes (Cosentinia) Sáenz de Rivas & Rivas Mart. 1979; Notholaena (Cosentinia) (Todaro 1866) Salvo 1982

= Cosentinia =

Genus of ferns

Cosentinia is a genus of ferns in the subfamily Pteridoideae of the family Pteridaceae with a single species Cosentinia vellea. Its native distribution ranges from the Canary Islands through Europe, northern Africa and Western Asia to the west Himalayas in the Indian subcontinent.

== Subspecies ==
As of December 2019, the Checklist of Ferns and Lycophytes of the World recognized two subspecies:

- Cosentinia vellea subsp. bivalens (Reichstein) Rivas Mart. & Salvo
- Cosentinia vellea subsp. ×rivas-martinezii Amp.Castillo & Salvo
- Cosentinia vellea subsp. vellea (Aiton) Tod.
