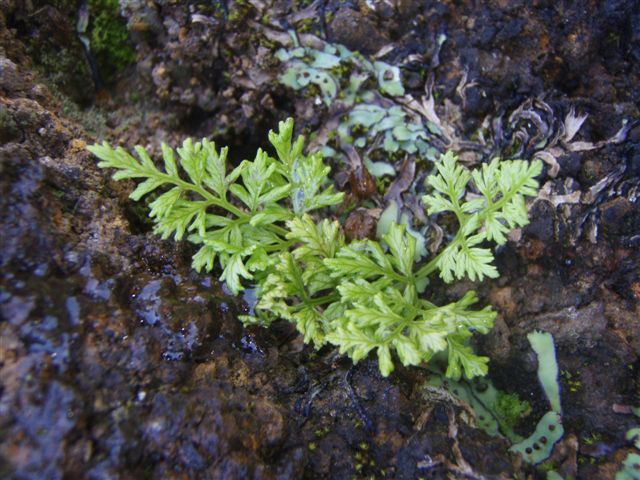

Conservation status
- Critically Endangered (IUCN 3.1)

Scientific classification
- Kingdom: Plantae
- Clade: Embryophytes
- Clade: Tracheophytes
- Division: Polypodiophyta
- Class: Polypodiopsida
- Order: Polypodiales
- Family: Pteridaceae
- Genus: Gastoniella
- Species: G. ascensionis

Binomial name
- Gastoniella ascensionis (Hook.) Li Bing Zhang & Liang Zhang

Synonyms
- Grammitis ascensionis Hook.; Anogramma ascensionis (Hook.) Diels; Gymnogramma ascensionis (Hook.) Hook.; Pityrogramma ascensionis (Hook.) Domin

= Gastoniella ascensionis =

Species of fern

Gastoniella ascensionis, the Ascension Island parsley fern, is a species of fern in the family Pteridaceae that is endemic to Ascension Island, a volcanic island in the South Atlantic Ocean. It is one of three species in the genus Gastoniella. It was thought to have become extinct due to habitat loss, until four plants were found on the island in 2010. Over 60 specimens were then successfully cultivated at Royal Botanic Gardens, Kew and on Ascension Island. It is now classified as Critically Endangered.

The small fern has delicate yellow-green leaves which appear similar to small sprigs of parsley. It was first recorded in 1842 by an amateur botanist, A.B. Curror, and then officially described and named by Joseph Dalton Hooker after a visit he made to the island in 1843. It is endemic to the steep slopes of Green Mountain on the island. Another specimen was recorded in 1889, with few or no reports of specimens again until 1958, when a British scientist collected one on the north slope of the mountain. Further searches were conducted in 1976, 1986 and 1995 but were unsuccessful, and in 2003 it was officially declared extinct.

There are ten species of plants endemic to Ascension Island, with seven of them still known to survive. The island lost much of its native habitat due to invasive animals and plants, beginning with goats introduced in the 16th century by Portuguese explorers. Other non-native animals, including rabbits, sheep, donkeys, and rats—along with over 200 non-native plant species—have destroyed much of the original habitat and plants.

The introduction of non-native plants and animals was greatly hastened beginning in 1847, when Joseph Dalton Hooker advised the Royal Navy to import plants to the island to change the dry cinder soil and arid climate. Kew Gardens, whose director at the time was Hooker's father, helped ship trees to Ascension Island beginning in 1850. Green Mountain in particular was transformed through their efforts. Competition from invasive and non-native maidenhair fern (Adiantum) is believed to be partly responsible for the near demise of G. ascensionis.

G. ascensionis was rediscovered during a routine plant survey being performed by a team from the Ascension Island Government's Conservation Department. Because it was found growing in dry rock, on a very steep ridge, the four plants had to be watered and kept alive long enough to produce spores. Two of the plants produced spores before they died. After harvesting, the spores were quickly airlifted to Kew Gardens, where they were placed in a sterile environment to produce sporelings. Sixty new ferns were raised at Kew, along with more on Ascension Island. Since then, a small number of plants were discovered growing near the original four.
