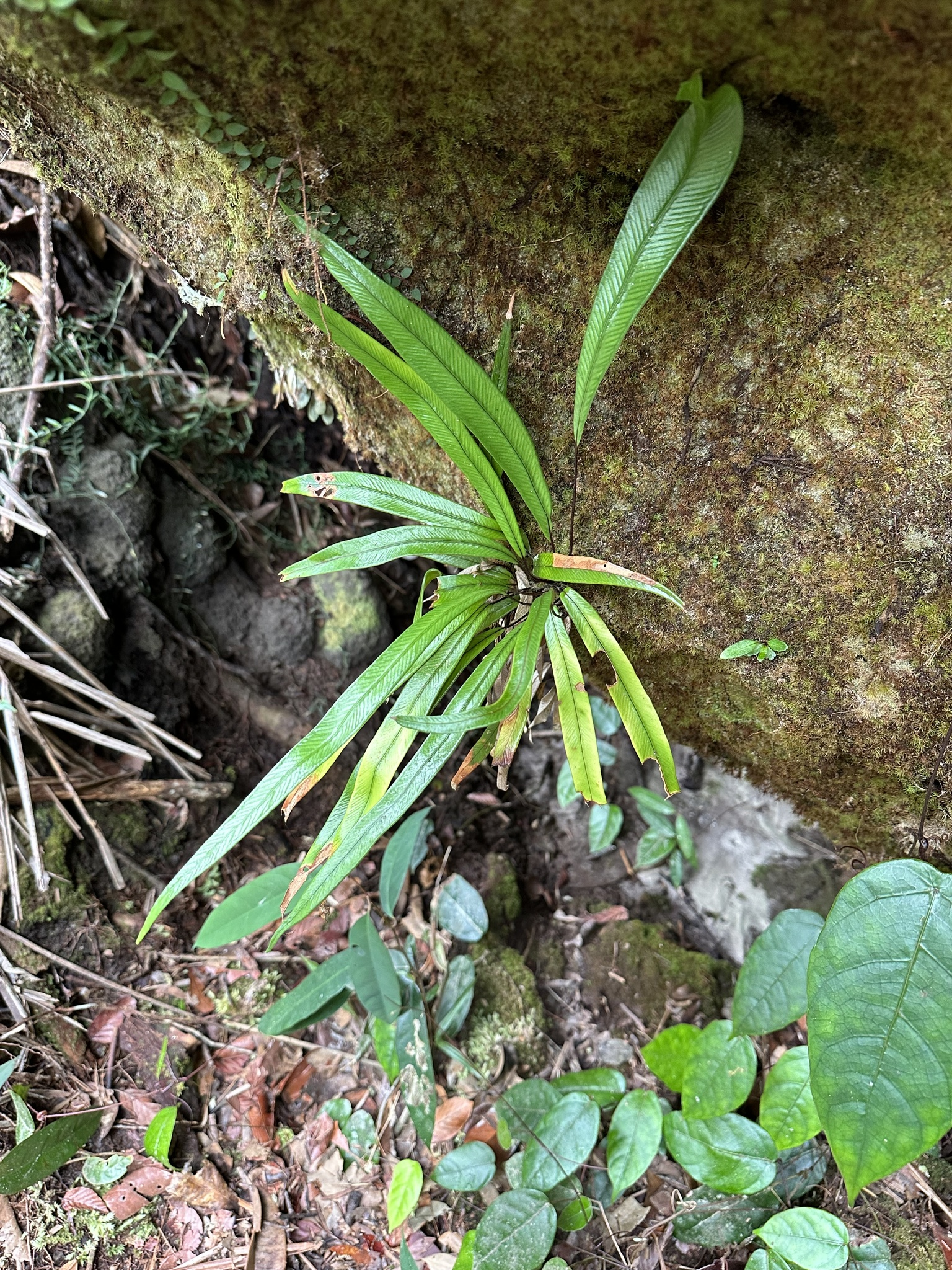
- Syngramma lobbiana in Borneo

Scientific classification
- Kingdom: Plantae
- Clade: Embryophytes
- Clade: Tracheophytes
- Division: Polypodiophyta
- Class: Polypodiopsida
- Order: Polypodiales
- Family: Pteridaceae
- Subfamily: Pteridoideae
- Genus: Syngramma; J.Sm.

Type species
- Syngramma alismifolia (Presl) Smith

Species
- See text

Synonyms
- Callogramme Fée; Craspedodictyum Copel.; Toxopteris Trevis.; Trichiogramme Kuhn

= Syngramma =

Genus of ferns

Syngramma is a genus of ferns in the subfamily Pteridoideae of the family Pteridaceae. Species are native to south-east tropical Asia and the Pacific.

== Phylogeny ==
As of July 2026, the Checklist of Ferns and Lycophytes of the World recognized the following sixteen species:

Phylogeny of Syngramma

- Syngramma
  - - S. borneensis (Hook.) J.Sm.
    - S. cartilagidens (Baker) Diels
  - - - S. alismifolia (C.Presl) J.Sm.
      - S. quinata (Hook.) Carruth.
    - - S. valleculata (Baker) C.Chr.
      - - S. lobbiana (Hook.) J.Sm.
        - S. wallichii (Hook.) Bedd.

Other species include:
- S. alta Copel.
- S. coriacea (Copel.) Holttum
- S. dayi Bedd.
- S. grandis (Copel.) C.Chr.
- S. magnifica (Copel.) Holttum
- S. minima Holttum
- S. spathulata (C.Chr.) Holttum
- S. trichophora Holttum
- S. vittiformis (J.Sm.) J.Sm.

Plants of the World Online also includes the six species of Austrogramme within Syngramma, although not all of them have published combinations there.
