= Cerosora =

Scientific classification
- Kingdom: Plantae
- Clade: Tracheophytes
- Division: Polypodiophyta
- Class: Polypodiopsida
- Order: Polypodiales
- Family: Pteridaceae
- Subfamily: Pteridoideae
- Genus: Cerosora (Baker) Domin

Type species
- Cerosora chrysosora (Baker) Domin

Species
- See text.

Synonyms
- Idiogramma Ghosh

Genus of ferns

Cerosora is a genus of ferns in the subfamily Pteridoideae of the family Pteridaceae.

== Species ==
As of December 2019, Plants of the World Online and the Checklist of Ferns and Lycophytes of the World recognized the following species:

- Cerosora argentea (Willd.) Hennequin & H.Schneid. (Curly gold fern, goldback fern)
- Cerosora chrysosora (Baker) Domin
- Cerosora microphylla (Hook.) R.M.Tryon
- Cerosora sumatrana Holttum
