= Tryonia (plant) =

Scientific classification
- Kingdom: Plantae
- Clade: Embryophytes
- Clade: Tracheophytes
- Division: Polypodiophyta
- Class: Polypodiopsida
- Order: Polypodiales
- Family: Pteridaceae
- Subfamily: Pteridoideae
- Genus: Tryonia; Schuettp., J.Prado & A.T.Cochran

Type species
- Tryonia myriophylla (Sw.) Schuettp., J.Prado & A.T.Cochran

Species
- See text.

Genus of ferns

Tryonia is a genus of ferns in the subfamily Pteridoideae of the family Pteridaceae. Species are native to the east of Brazil and to Uruguay.

The genus was circumscribed by Eric Schuettpelz, Jefferson Prado and Alyssa T. Cochran in PhytoKeys vol.35 on page 35 in 2014.

The genus name of Tryonia is in honour of Alice F. Tryon (1920–2009), who was an American botanist (mainly pteridology). She examined the taxonomy of the fern genera Jamesonia.

== Species ==
As of July 2026, the Checklist of Ferns and Lycophytes of the World recognized the following species:

Phylogeny of Tryonia

- - T. schwackeana (Christ) Schuettp., J.Prado & A.T.Cochran
  - - T. areniticola (Schwartsb. & Labiak) Schuettp., Prado & A.T.Cochran
    - T. myriophylla (Sw.) Schuettp., J.Prado & A.T.Cochran

Other species:

- T. macrophylla A.Rojas
- T. sellowiana (C.Presl) Schuettp., J.Prado & A.T.Cochran
