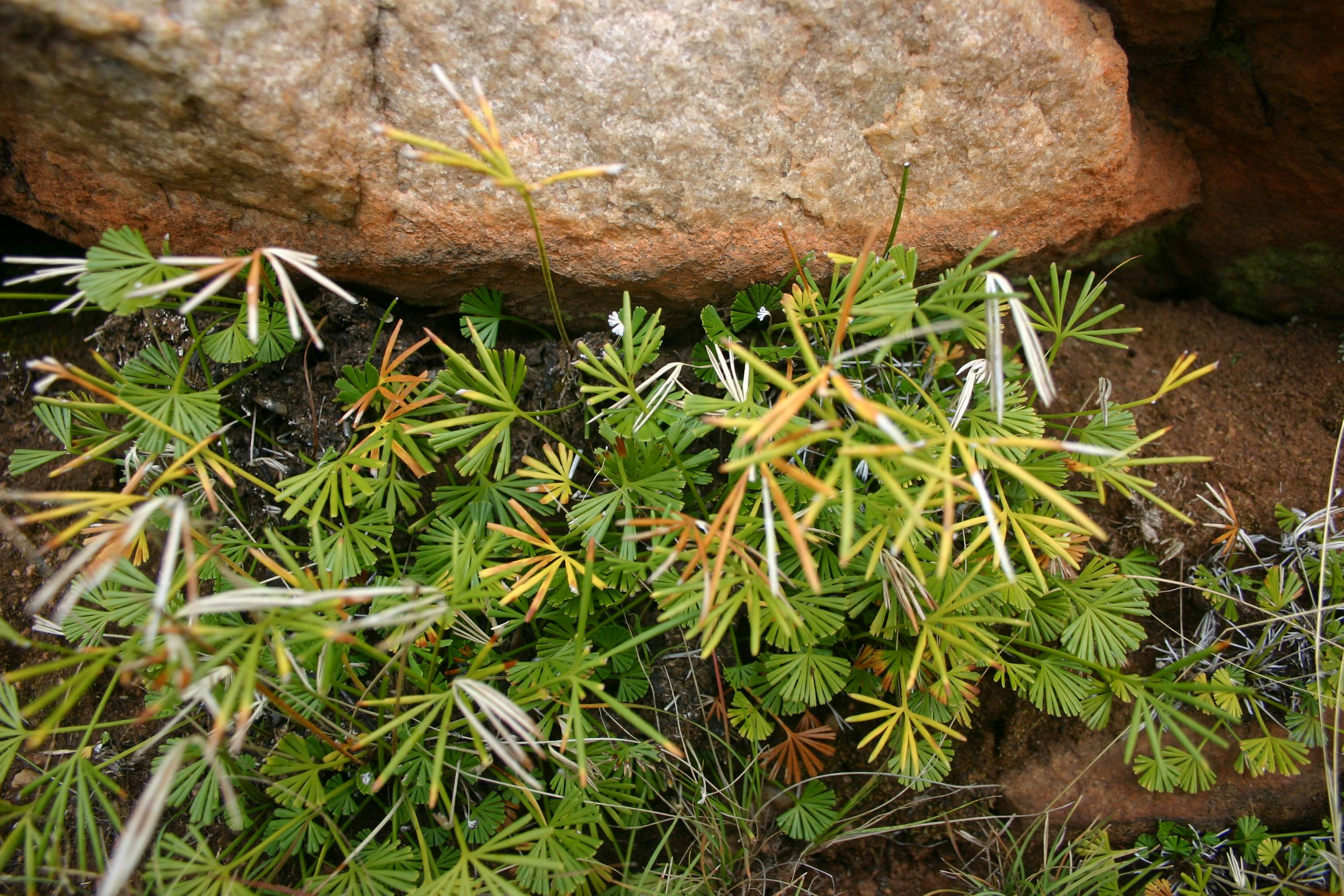
- Actiniopteris radiata

Scientific classification
- Kingdom: Plantae
- Clade: Tracheophytes
- Division: Polypodiophyta
- Class: Polypodiopsida
- Order: Polypodiales
- Family: Pteridaceae
- Subfamily: Pteridoideae
- Genus: Actiniopteris; Link

Type species
- Actiniopteris radiata (Koenig ex Swartz) Link

Species
- A. australis; A. dimorpha; A. pauciloba; A. radiata; A. semiflabellata

= Actiniopteris =

Genus of ferns

Actiniopteris is a fern genus in the subfamily Pteridoideae of the family Pteridaceae.

== Phylogeny ==
The Plant List and Tropicos recognise 5 accepted species:

Phylogeny of Actiniopteris

- Actiniopteris
  - A. radiata (Sw.) Link
  - - A. australis Link
    - - A. semiflabellata Pic.Serm.
      - A. dimorpha Pic.Serm.

Other species include:
- A. pauciloba Pichi Sermolli
