= Alice F. Tryon =

American botanist

Alice Faber Tryon
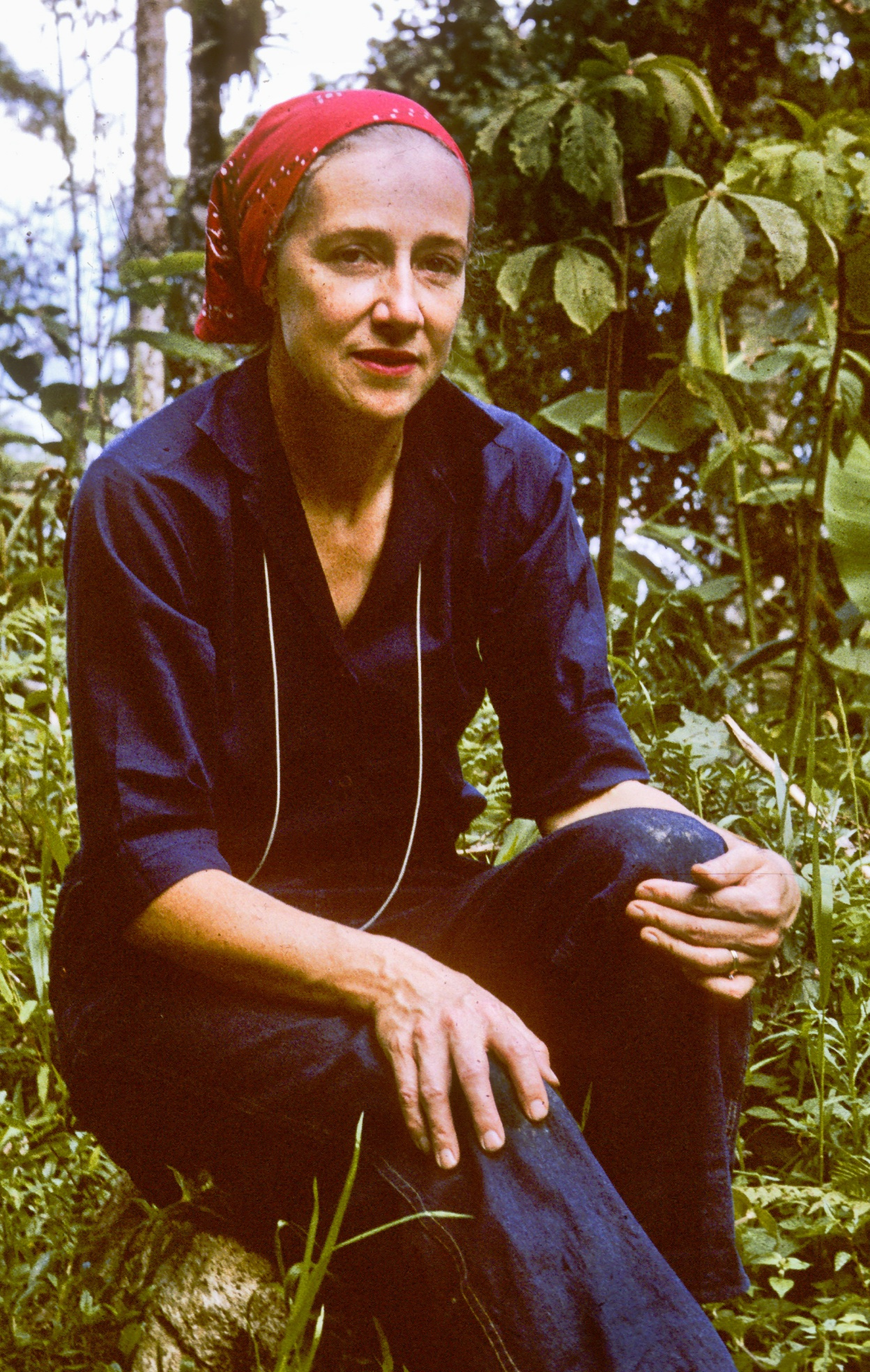
- Alice Tryon in Brazil
- Born: August 2, 1920; Milwaukee, Wisconsin, United States
- Died: March 29, 2009 (aged 88)
- Education: University of Wisconsin–Madison; Washington University in St. Louis
- Spouse: Rolla M. Tryon
- Scientific career
- Fields: Botany
- Workplaces: Gray Herbarium, Harvard University
- Author abbrev. (botany): A.F.Tryon

Alice Faber Tryon (1920–2009) was an American botanist who specialized in the systematics of ferns and other spore-dispersed plants (pteridology). She had two general areas of interest in her work, first incorporating the use of spore surface patterns into the understanding of fern diversity and systematics, and second the fern family Pteridaceae.

== Biography ==
Alice Faber Tryon was born Alice Elizabeth Faber in Milwaukee, Wisconsin, on August 2, 1920, to Arthur and Laura Bindrich Faber.

Alice Tryon completed her bachelor's degree in 1941 at Milwaukee State Teacher’s College (now the University of Wisconsin). She completed her master’s thesis on the taxonomic utility of spore characters in the spikemoss genus Selaginella at the University of Wisconsin in 1945. Her doctoral degree she received at Washington University in 1952, where her PhD dissertation was on the diversity and taxonomy of the New World species of Pellaea, a genus of xerically adapted ferns in the Pteridaceae. She first began working with Rolla Milton Tryon, Jr. in 1945 as a student at the University of Wisconsin–Madison. In 1946, she became a member of the American Fern Society and became an honorary member in 1978. The Tryons moved to Harvard in 1958, where they spent the majority of their professional careers. At Harvard, they organized and offered an annual New England Fern Conference, which brought students and professors together in an informal and productive setting. Becoming the first woman member of the New England Botanical Club in 1968, Tryon was elected President in 1978.

After retiring from Harvard, the Tryons founded the Institute for Systematic Botany and endowed the Tryon Lecture Series.

Throughout her career she worked closely with her husband, traveling internationally and frequently publishing together—including their systematic survey of the ferns, with emphasis on tropical America. Her work on spore surface patterns was enhanced by her incorporation of scanning electron microscope images. With Bernard Lugardon, an authority on the interior structure of fern spores using transmission electron microscope images, published a complete survey of fern spore diversity in 1991. Tryon also made significant contributions to the study of fern reproductive biology with her studies of apomixis in Pellaea.

In 2002, her collection was donated to the Alice and Rolla Tryon Pteridophyte Library at the University of Vermont.

In 2014, Tryonia was described as a new taenitidoid fern genus in the Pteridaceae segregated from Jamesonia and Eriosorus. The name honored Tryon for her "extraordinary" work in fern systematics, which included publishing revisions of both previous genera.

Tryon died March 29, 2009, in Pensacola, Florida.

The standard author abbreviation A.F.Tryon is used to indicate this person as the author when citing a botanical name.
