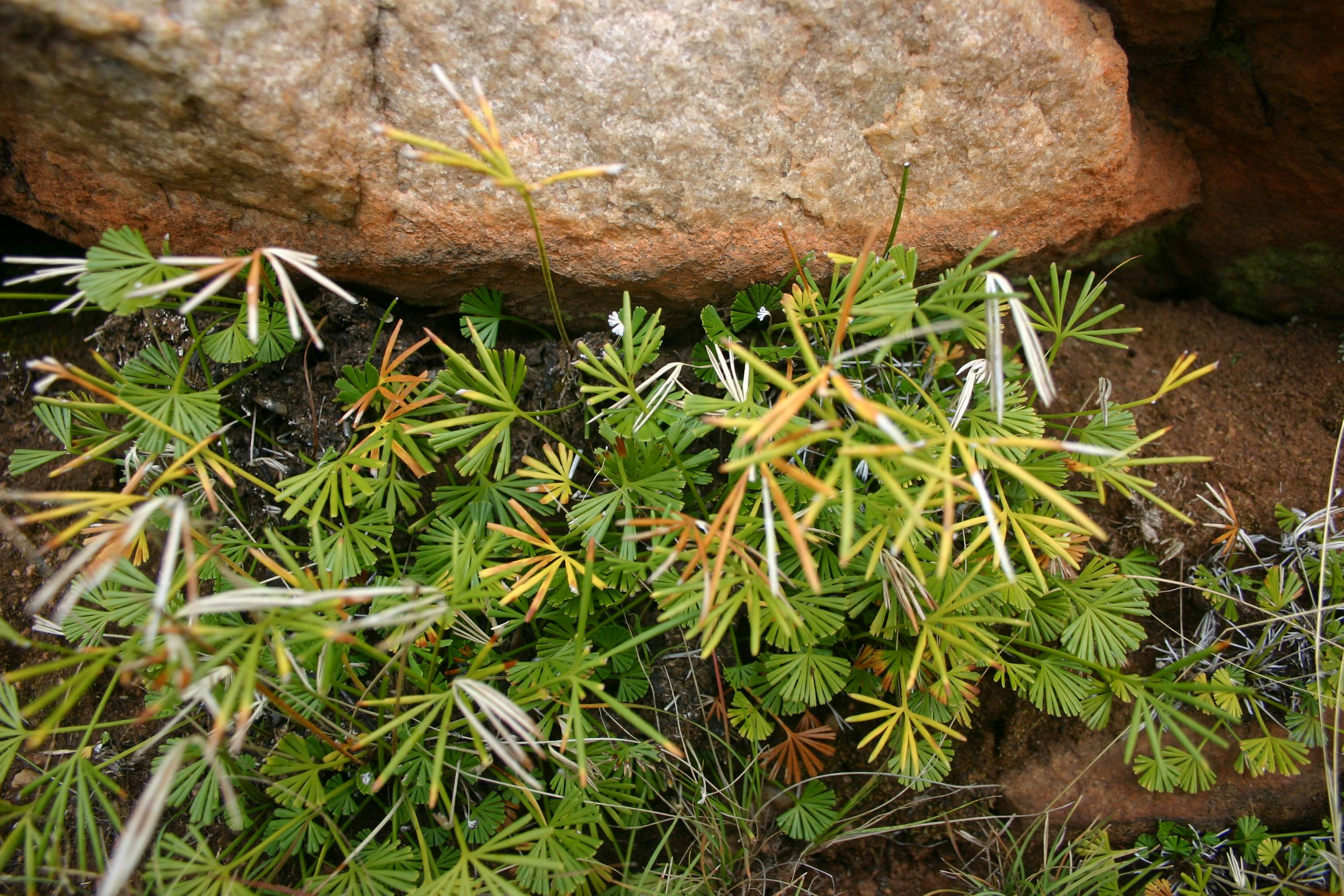
- Actiniopteris dimorpha
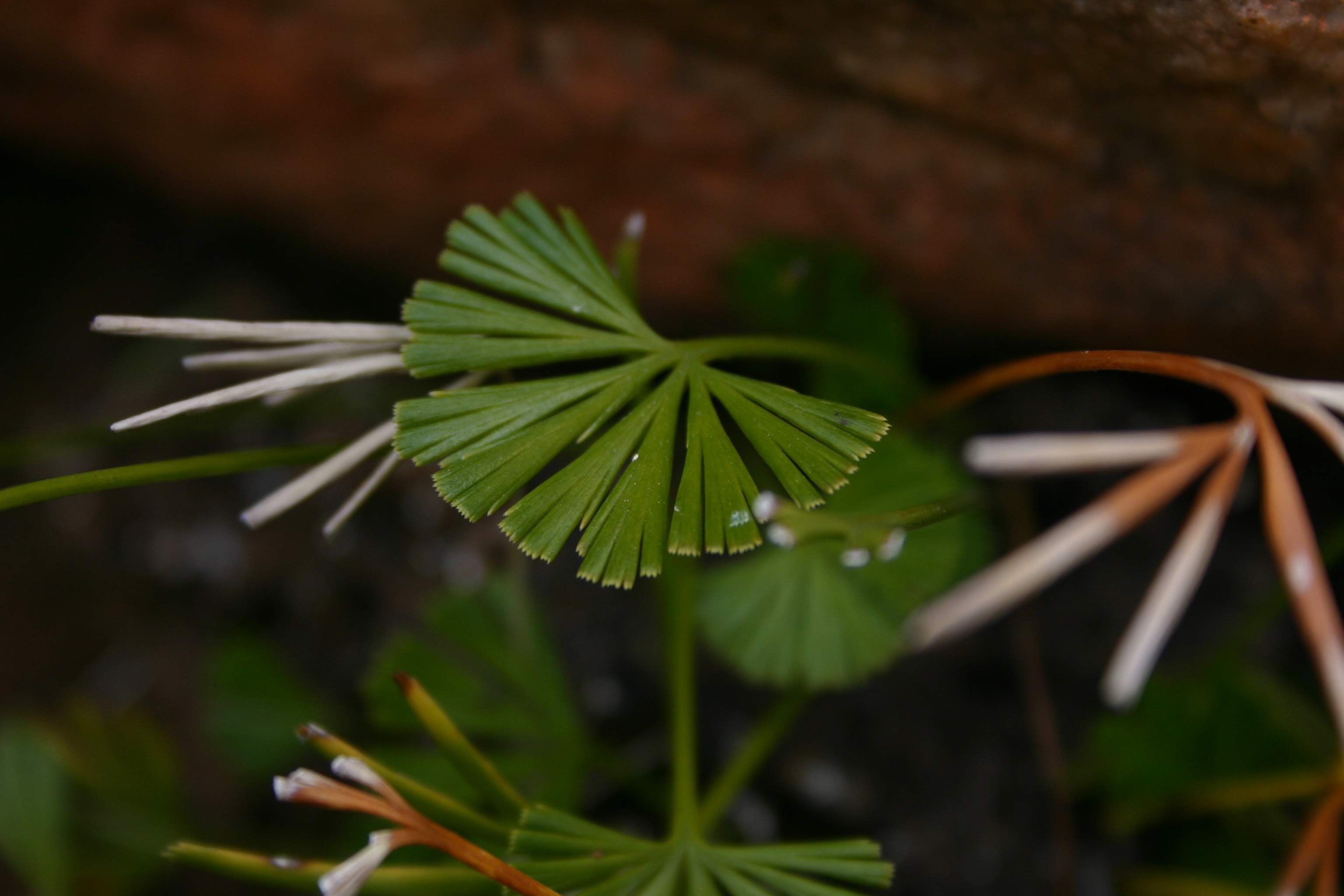
- Actiniopteris dimorpha

Scientific classification
- Kingdom: Plantae
- Clade: Tracheophytes
- Division: Polypodiophyta
- Class: Polypodiopsida
- Order: Polypodiales
- Family: Pteridaceae
- Genus: Actiniopteris
- Species: A. radiata

Binomial name
- Actiniopteris radiata (J. Koenig ex Sw.) Link

= Actiniopteris radiata =

Species of fern

Actiniopteris radiata (Actiniopteris = 'ray fern') is a widely distributed fern occurring throughout Africa and adjacent islands, Madagascar, Arabia, Iran, Afghanistan, Nepal, India, Sri Lanka, Burma and Australia. It bears a close resemblance to Actiniopteris dimorpha Pic. Serm.

This species is found in hot, dry habitats, growing at the base of rocks and in crevices, but also on deep soil in shady places. It is common in deciduous woodland with perennially high temperatures and low rainfall, ranging from 500m to 1300m.

The distinctive fronds issue from a prostrate rhizome and are somewhat dimorphic. The laminae are 15-45mm long and fan-shaped with a spread of some 180 degrees, the tip of each segment bearing 2–5 teeth.

Tests have shown that an aqueous and ethanolic extract of Actiniopteris radiata exhibits potent analgesic properties and antibacterial activity against Salmonella typhi "Staphylococcus aureus" and Escherichia coli. The species also shows anti-fertility, styptic, anthelmintic, anti-tubercular and antioxidant properties. Major chemical constituents are hentriacontane, hentriacontanol, β-sitosterol, β-sitosterol palmitate, β-sitosterol-D-glucoside and quercetin-3-rutinoside

In 1992 Botswana issued a postage stamp by Gillian Condy depicting this species.

== Synonyms ==
Synonyms include:

- Acrostichum radiatum (J.König ex Sw.) Poir.
- Actiniopteris australis sensu Sim
- Asplenium radiatum J.König ex Sw.
- Pteris radiata (J.König ex Sw.) Bojer
