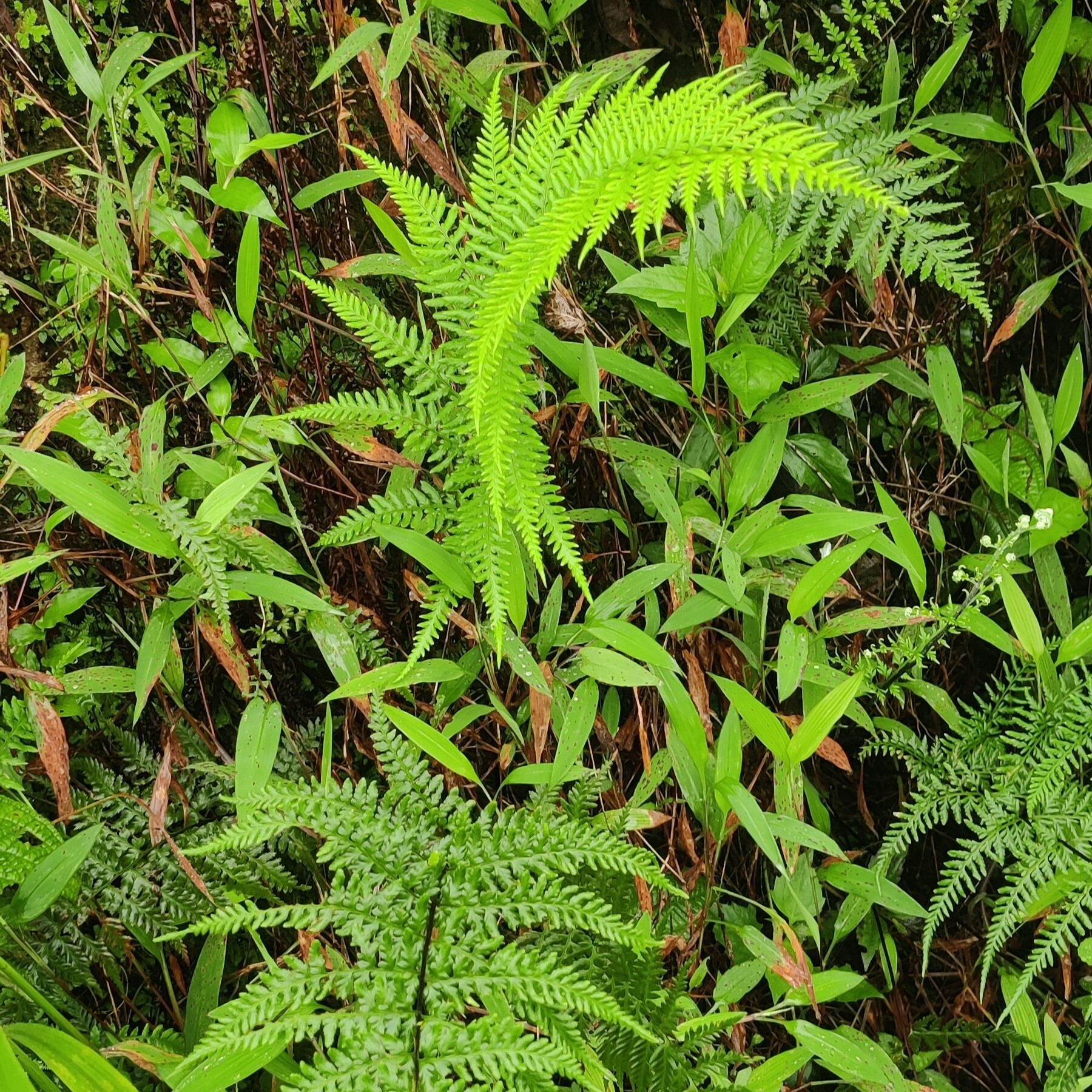

Scientific classification
- Kingdom: Plantae
- Clade: Tracheophytes
- Division: Polypodiophyta
- Class: Polypodiopsida
- Order: Polypodiales
- Family: Pteridaceae
- Genus: Pityrogramma
- Species: P. calomelanos

Binomial name
- Pityrogramma calomelanos (L.) Link

= Pityrogramma calomelanos =

Species of fern

Pityrogramma calomelanos, commonly known as the silver fern, is a rhizomatous geophyte or lithophyte native to Mexico and Tropical America. It grows mainly in subtropical regions and has been introduced widely across Asia, Africa, and Pacific islands.
