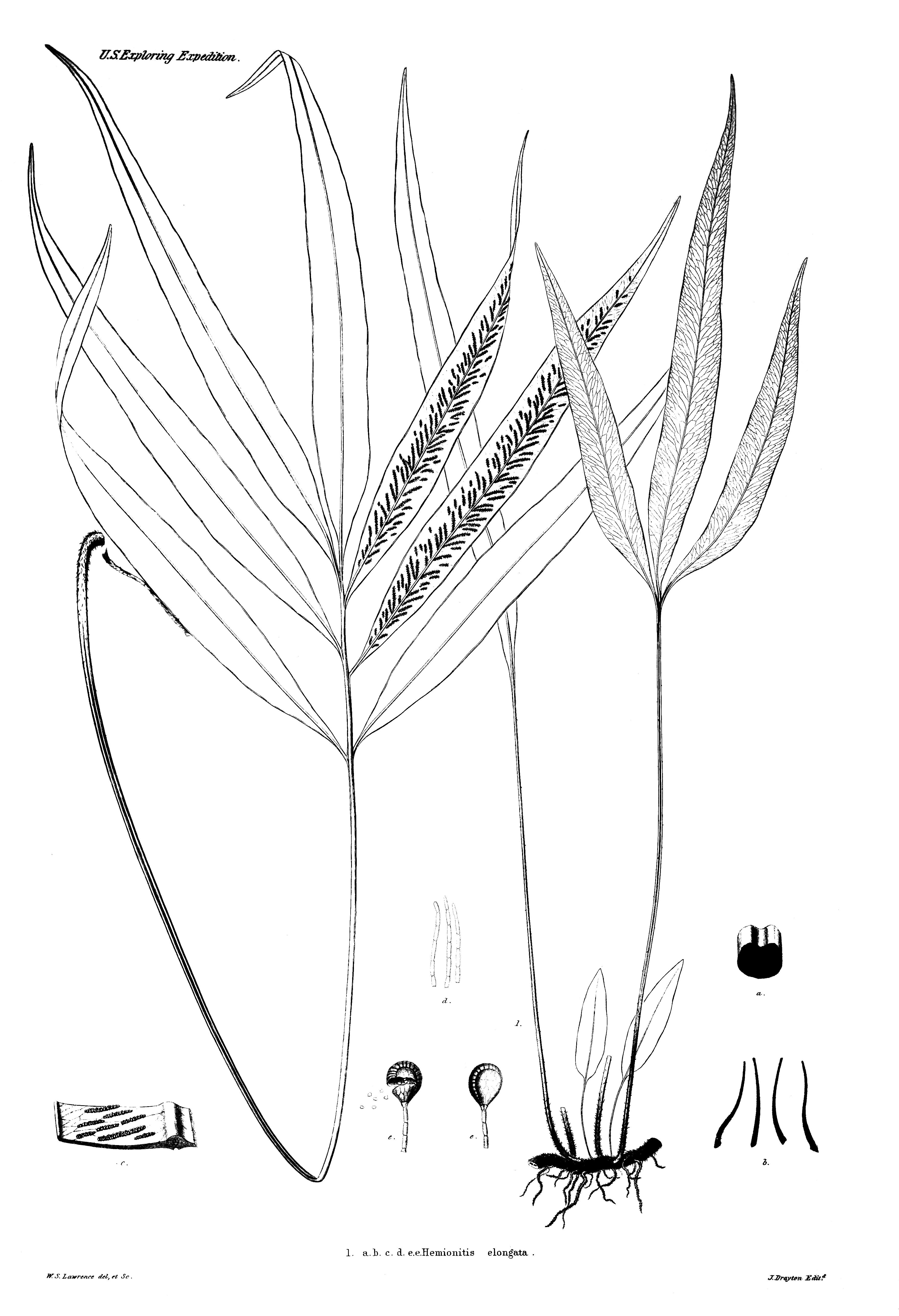
- Illustration of Taenitis pinnata (as Hemionitis elongata Brack., non Hemionitis elongata Cav.)

Scientific classification
- Kingdom: Plantae
- Clade: Tracheophytes
- Division: Polypodiophyta
- Class: Polypodiopsida
- Order: Polypodiales
- Family: Pteridaceae
- Subfamily: Pteridoideae
- Genus: Taenitis; Willd. ex Schkuhr

Type species
- Taenitis pteroides (Willdenow) Schkuhr

Species
- See text.

Synonyms
- Holttumia Copel.; Holttumiella Copel.; Platytaenia Kuhn; Schizolepton Fée

= Taenitis =

Genus of ferns

Taenitis is a genus of ferns in the subfamily Pteridoideae of the family Pteridaceae. Species are native to south-east tropical Asia, Australia and the Pacific.

== Species ==
As of December 2019, Plants of the World Online and the Checklist of Ferns and Lycophytes of the World recognized the following species:

Phylogeny of Taenitis

- - - T. cordata (Gaudich.) Holttum
    - T. pinnata (J.Sm.) Holttum
  - - T. diversifolia Holttum
    - - T. hookeri (C.Chr.) Holttum
      - - T. dimorpha Holttum
        - - T. blechnoides (Willd.) Sw.
          - T. interrupta Hook. & Grev.

Other species:

- T. brooksii Copel.
- T. flabellivenia (Baker) Holttum
- T. hosei (Baker) Holttum
- T. intermedia M.Kato
- T. marginata Holttum
- T. mediosora M.Kato
- T. obtusa Hook.
- T. requiniana (Gaudich.) Copel.
- T. trilobata Holttum
- T. vittarioides Holttum
