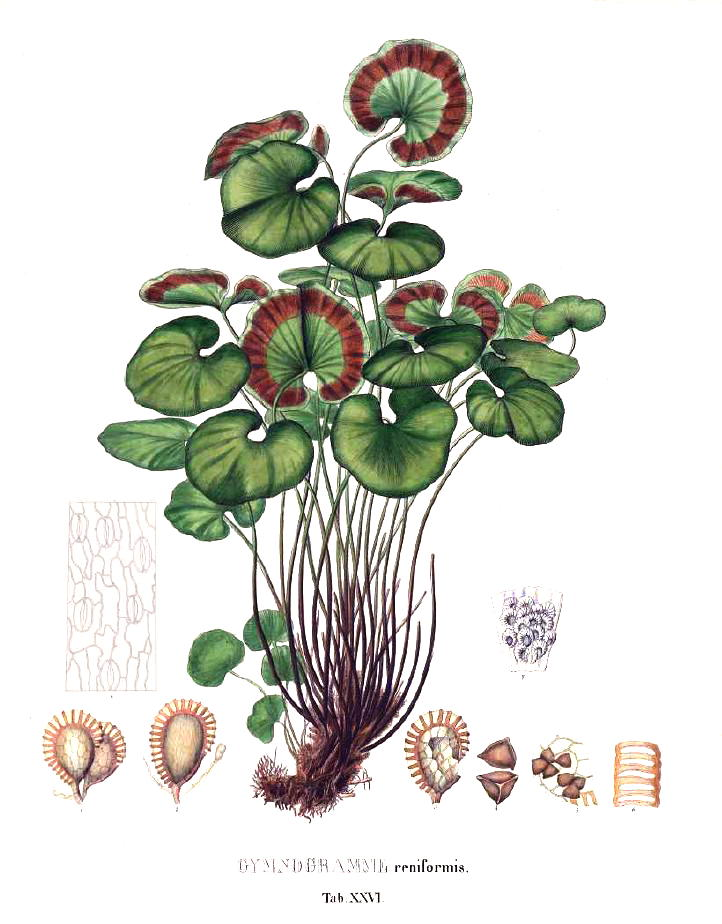
- Illustration of Pterozonium reniforme

Scientific classification
- Kingdom: Plantae
- Clade: Embryophytes
- Clade: Tracheophytes
- Division: Polypodiophyta
- Class: Polypodiopsida
- Order: Polypodiales
- Family: Pteridaceae
- Subfamily: Pteridoideae
- Genus: Pterozonium; Fée

Type species
- Pterozonium reniforme (Mart.) Fée

Species
- See text.

Synonyms
- Syngrammatopsis Alston

= Pterozonium =

Genus of ferns

Pterozonium is a genus of ferns in the subfamily Pteridoideae of the family Pteridaceae. Species are mainly found in north-western South America, as well as Costa Rica.

== Species ==
As of July 2026, Plants of the World Online and the Checklist of Ferns and Lycophytes of the World recognized the following fourteen species:

Phylogeny of Pterozonium

- - P. reniforme (Mart.) Fée
  - - P. brevifrons (Smith) Lellinger
    - P. cyclosorum Smith

Other species:

- P. cyclophyllum Diels
- P. elaphoglossoides (Baker ex Thurn) Lellinger
- P. lineare Lellinger
- P. maguirei Lellinger
- P. paraphysatum (A.C.Sm.) Lellinger
- P. retroflexum Mickel
- P. scopulinum Lellinger
- P. spectabile Maxon & A.C.Sm.
- P. steyermarkii Vareschi
- P. tatei A.C.Sm.
- P. terrestre Lellinger
