= Gastoniella =

Scientific classification
- Kingdom: Plantae
- Clade: Tracheophytes
- Division: Polypodiophyta
- Class: Polypodiopsida
- Order: Polypodiales
- Family: Pteridaceae
- Genus: Gastoniella; Li Bing Zhang & Liang Zhang

Species
- See text

Genus of plants

Gastoniella is a genus of ferns belonging to the family Pteridaceae.

Its native range is Ascension, South America and North America.

== Phylogeny ==
Nitta et al. 2022 and Fern Tree of life

- Gastoniella
  - G. novogaliciana (Mickel) Li Bing Zhang & Liang Zhang
  - - G. ascensionis (Hook.) Li Bing Zhang & Liang Zhang
    - G. chaerophylla (Desv.) Li Bing Zhang & Liang Zhang
