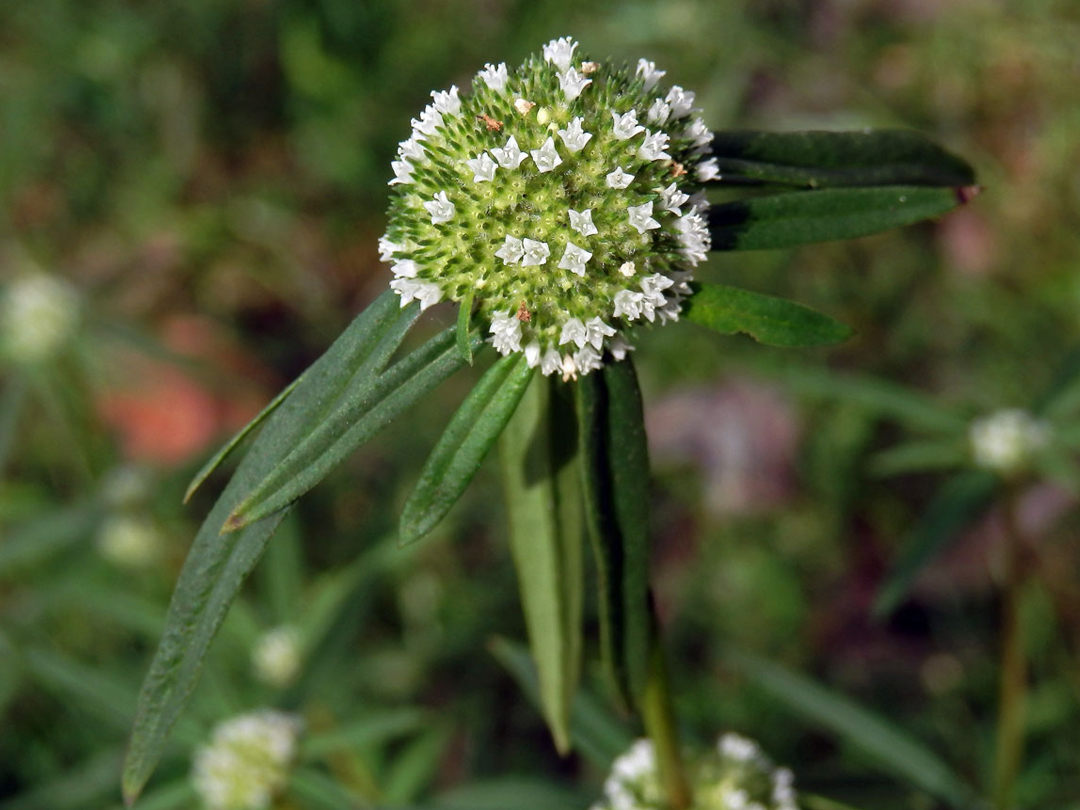

Scientific classification
- Kingdom: Plantae
- Clade: Tracheophytes
- Clade: Angiosperms
- Clade: Eudicots
- Clade: Asterids
- Order: Gentianales
- Family: Rubiaceae
- Genus: Scleromitrion
- Species: S. verticillatum

Binomial name
- Scleromitrion verticillatum (L.) R.J.Wang

Synonyms
- Hedyotis verticillata (L.) Lam.; Oldenlandia verticillata L.

= Scleromitrion verticillatum =

Species of plant

Scleromitrion verticillatum is a perennial native to south and southeast Asia. It was originally described as Oldenlandia verticillata L. by Carl Linnaeus in 1767, and later considered part of the genus Hedyotis. It was moved to the genus Scleromitrion by R.J.Wang in 2014.

The chemical compound Kaempferitrin can be isolated from its leaves.

== Taxonomy ==
Scleromitrion verticillatum (L.) R.J.Wang
