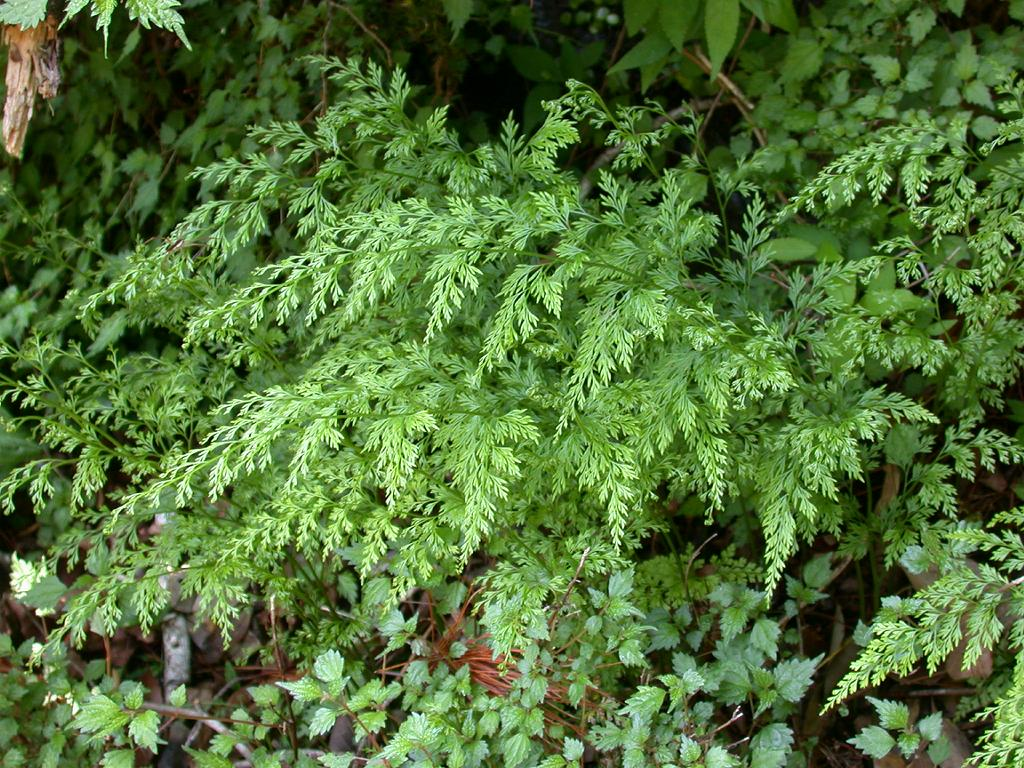
- Growing in Japan

Scientific classification
- Kingdom: Plantae
- Clade: Tracheophytes
- Division: Polypodiophyta
- Class: Polypodiopsida
- Order: Polypodiales
- Family: Pteridaceae
- Genus: Onychium
- Species: O. japonicum

Binomial name
- Onychium japonicum (Thunb.) Kunze, nom. cons.

Synonyms
- Allosorus capensis C.Presl; Asplenium japonicum Kunze; Asplenium swartzianum Kunze; Caenopteris japonica (Thunb.) Thunb.; Cryptogramma japonica (Thunb.) Prantl; Darea japonica (Thunb.) Willd.; Onychium capense Kaulf.; Onychium carvifolium Fée; Onychium chinense Fée; Pteris japonica (Thunb.) Mett.; Trichomanes japonicum Thunb.

= Onychium japonicum =

Species of fern

Onychium japonicum is a species of fern in the family Pteridaceae.

== Taxonomy ==
The species was first described in 1784 by Carl Peter Thunberg as Trichomanes japonicum. In 1825, Blume used the name "Onychium" for a genus of orchids, but this was illegitimate since it had been used in 1820 for the fern genus. Blume also used the combination "Onychium japonicum" for an orchid (now Dendrobium moniliforme). In 1848, Kunze transferred Trichomanes japonicum to the fern genus Onychium as Onychium japonicum. The name Onychium japonicum (Thunb.) Kunze is conserved against Onychium japonicum Blume.
