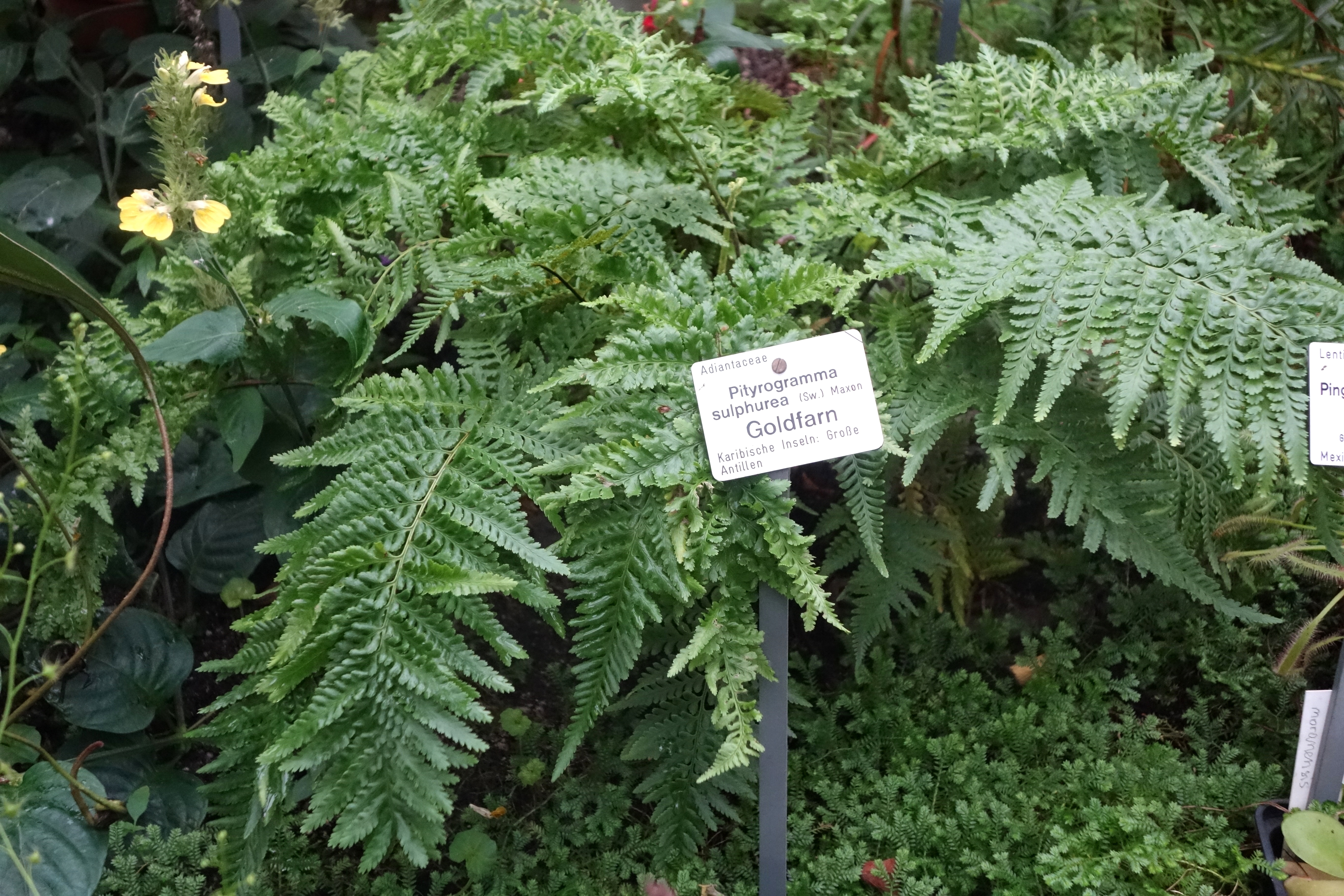
- Pityrogramma sulphurea

Scientific classification
- Kingdom: Plantae
- Clade: Tracheophytes
- Division: Polypodiophyta
- Class: Polypodiopsida
- Order: Polypodiales
- Family: Pteridaceae
- Subfamily: Pteridoideae
- Genus: Pityrogramma; Link

Type species
- Pityrogramma chrysophylla (Swartz) Link

Species
- See text.

Synonyms
- Calomelanos (Presl 1836) Lindl.; Ceropteris Link; Neurogramma Link; ×Pityromeria Gómez; Trismeria Fée 1852

= Pityrogramma =

Genus of ferns

Pityrogramma, the silverback ferns, or goldback ferns, is a fern genus in the subfamily Pteridoideae of the family Pteridaceae.

== Species ==
As of December 2019, Plants of the World Online recognized the following species and hybrids:

Phylogeny of Pityrogramma

- - section Cerogramme
    - P. ebenea (von Linné) Proctor (Mountain silverback fern)
    - - P. austroamericana Domin
      - P. sulphurea (Swartz) Maxon (Jamaican goldback fern)
  - section Calomelanos
    - P. trifoliata (von Linné) Tryon (Goldenrod Fern, threeleaf goldback fern)
    - - P. calomelanos (von Linné) Link (Dixie silverback fern)
      - P. ochracea (Presl) Domin

Other species:

- P. aurantiaca (Hieron.) C.Chr.
- P. chrysoconia Maxon ex Domin
- P. chrysophylla Link (Island goldback fern)
- P. dealbata (C.Presl) Domin
- P. dukei Lellinger
- P. eggersii Maxon
- P. elongata (C.Chr.) Pic.Serm.
- P. euchrysa (Ekman ex Christensen) Ekman ex Testo
- P. ferruginea (Kunze) Maxon
- P. ×herzogii (Rosenst.) L.D.Gómez
- P. hirsuta Testo
- P. humbertii C.Chr.
- P. jamesonii (Baker) Domin
- P. lehmannii (Hieron.) R.M.Tryon
- P. ×mckenneyi W.H.Wagner
- P. opalescens Sundue
- P. pearcei Domin
- P. pulchella Domin
- P. rupicola Pic.Serm.
- P. schizophylla (Baker) Maxon
- P. triangulata Maxon
- P. ×watkinsii Testo
- P. williamsii Proctor

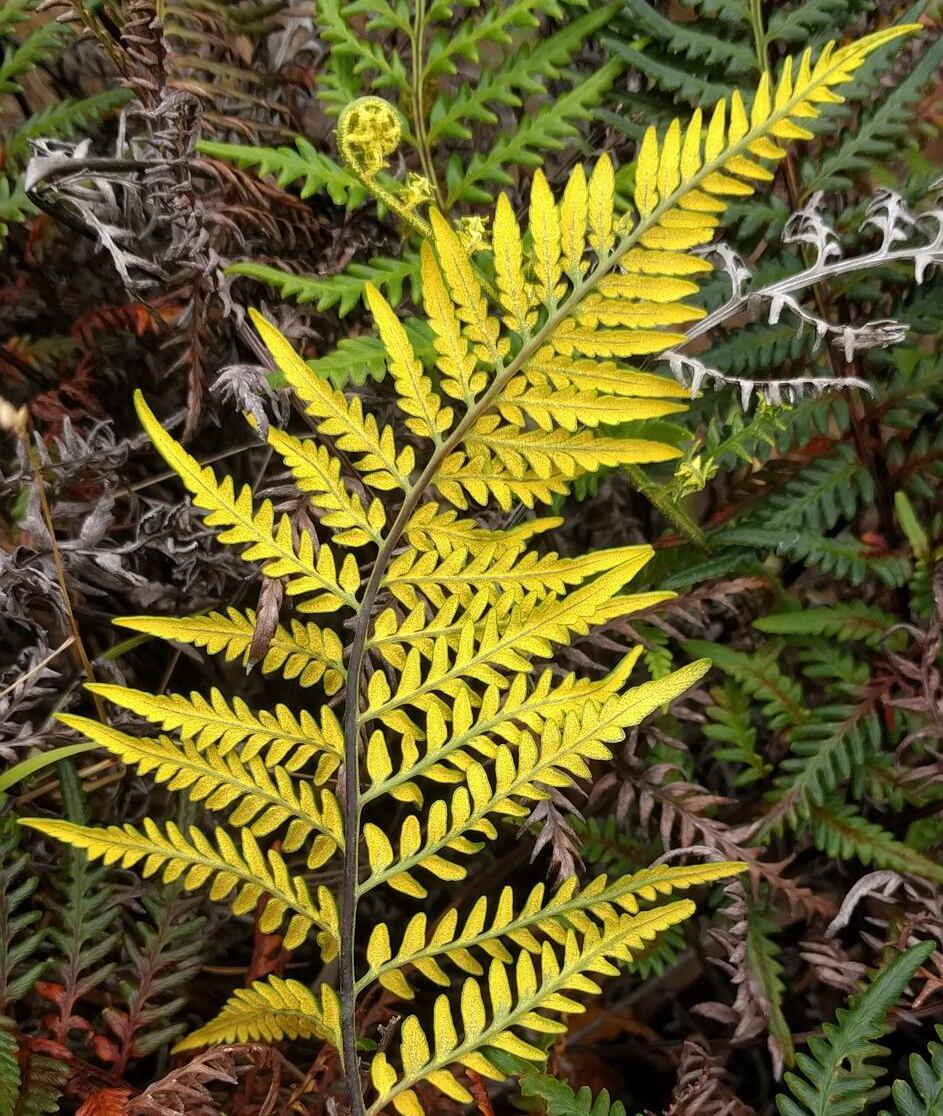
Gold fern (P. austroamericana)

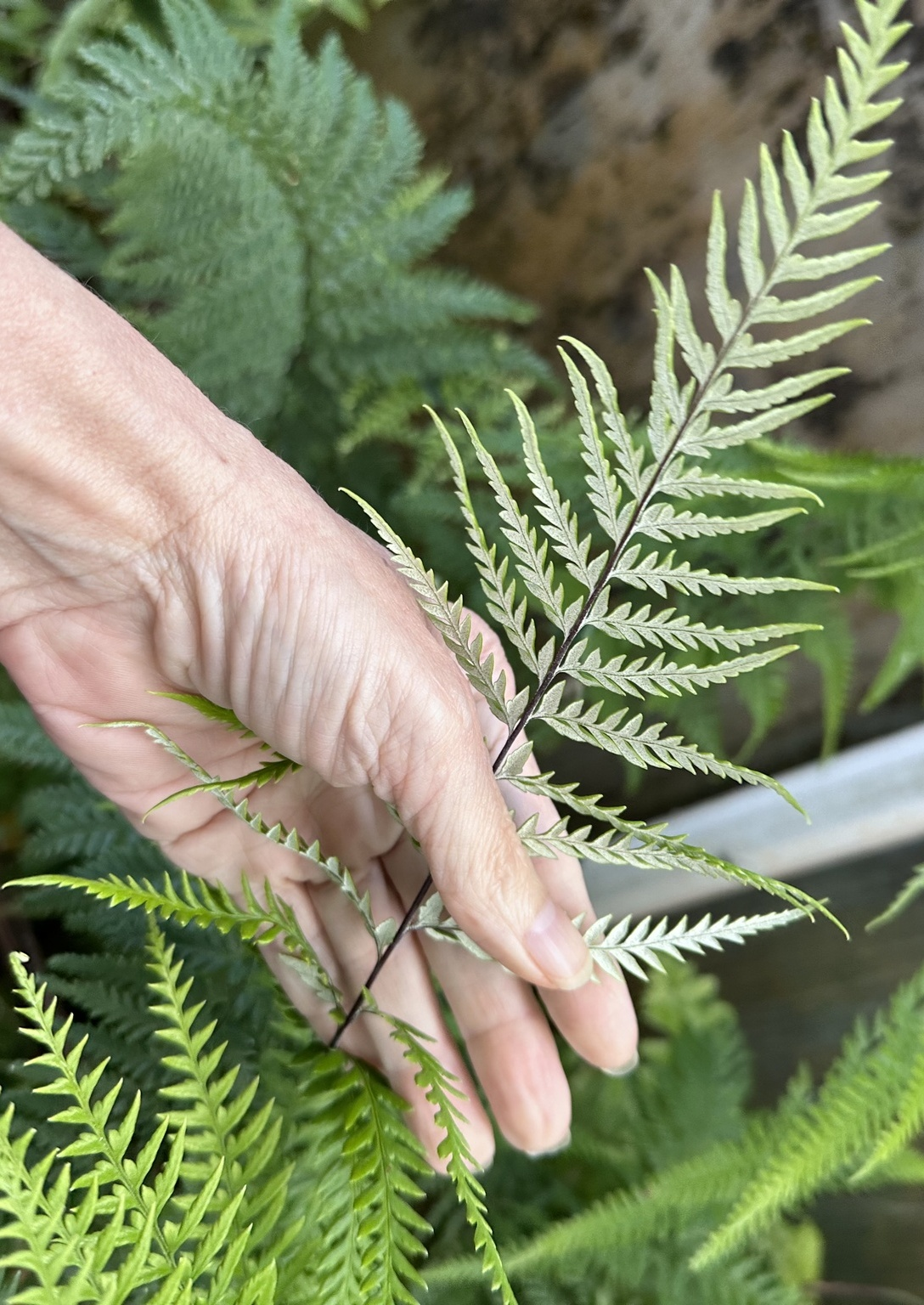
Silver fern (P. calomelanos)
