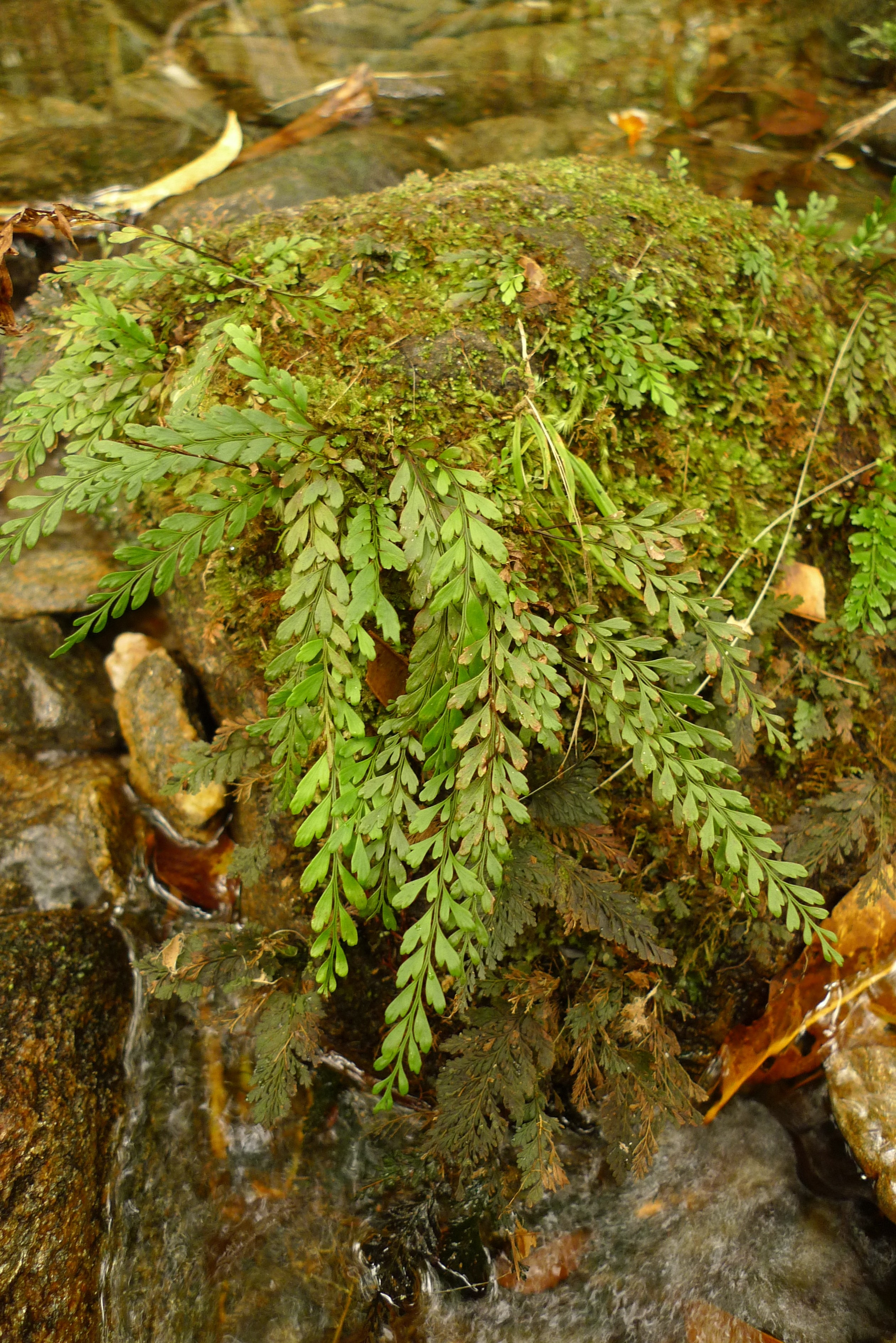
- Austrogramme decipiens

Scientific classification
- Kingdom: Plantae
- Clade: Tracheophytes
- Division: Polypodiophyta
- Class: Polypodiopsida
- Order: Polypodiales
- Family: Pteridaceae
- Subfamily: Pteridoideae
- Genus: Austrogramme; E.Fourn.

Type species
- Austrogramme marginata (Mettenius) E.Fourn.

Species
- See text.

Synonyms
- Aspleniopsis Mettenius ex Kuhn

= Austrogramme =

Genus of ferns

Austrogramme is a genus of ferns in the subfamily Pteridoideae of the family Pteridaceae.

== Species ==
As of December 2019, Plants of the World Online and the Checklist of Ferns and Lycophytes of the World recognized the following species:

Phylogeny of Austrogramme

- - A. boerlageana (Alderw.) Hennipman
  - - A. decipiens (Mett.) Hennipman
    - A. marginata E.Fourn.

Other species:

- A. asplenioides (Holttum) Hennipman
- A. francii (Rosenst.) Hennipman
- A. luzonica (Alderw.) M.Kato
