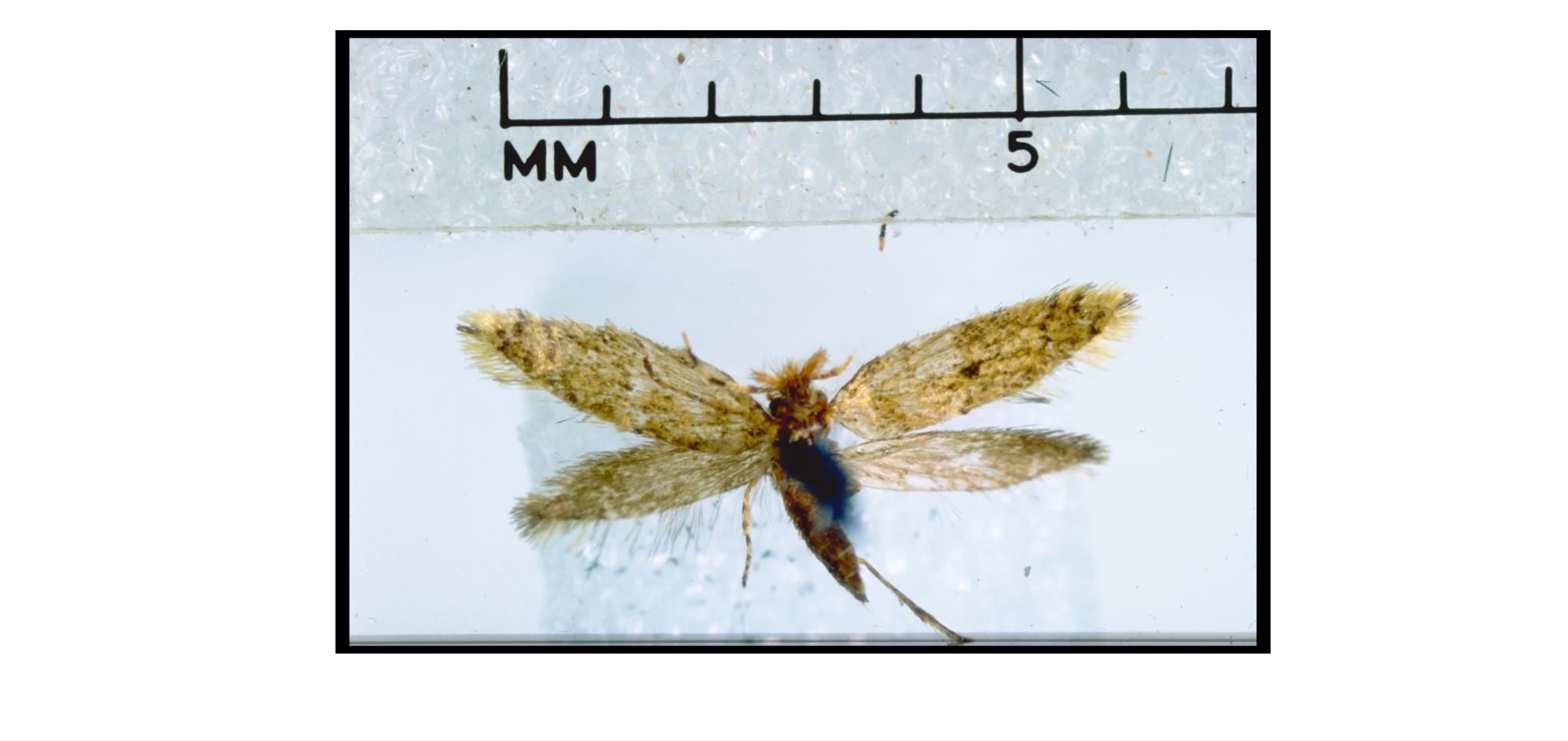
- Holotype specimen

Scientific classification
- Kingdom: Animalia
- Phylum: Arthropoda
- Class: Insecta
- Order: Lepidoptera
- Family: Micropterigidae
- Genus: Sabatinca
- Species: S. demissa

Binomial name
- Sabatinca demissa Philpott, 1923

= Sabatinca demissa =

Species of moth endemic to New Zealand

Sabatinca demissa is a species of moth belonging to the family Micropterigidae. It is endemic to New Zealand and is found in the northern half of the North Island. The larvae of this species are small in size and are coloured pale green with darker green or black patches on the rear of its body. The adult moth is coloured yellow-brown with black dots on its forewings. It is a small moth with a wingspan of approximately 6.5 mm in length. Unlike many species of moth, it does not have a pheromone communication system. The adults of the species are on the wing from November to January. The larvae of this species feed on leafy types of liverwort. The adults of this species feed on the spores of fertile cones of Lycopodium volubile and Lycopodium scariosum.

== Taxonomy ==
This species was first described by Alfred Philpott in 1923. Philpott used three specimens collected by Robin John Tillyard in November at Te Wairoa Falls. The holotype specimen is held in the New Zealand Arthropod Collection.

== Description ==
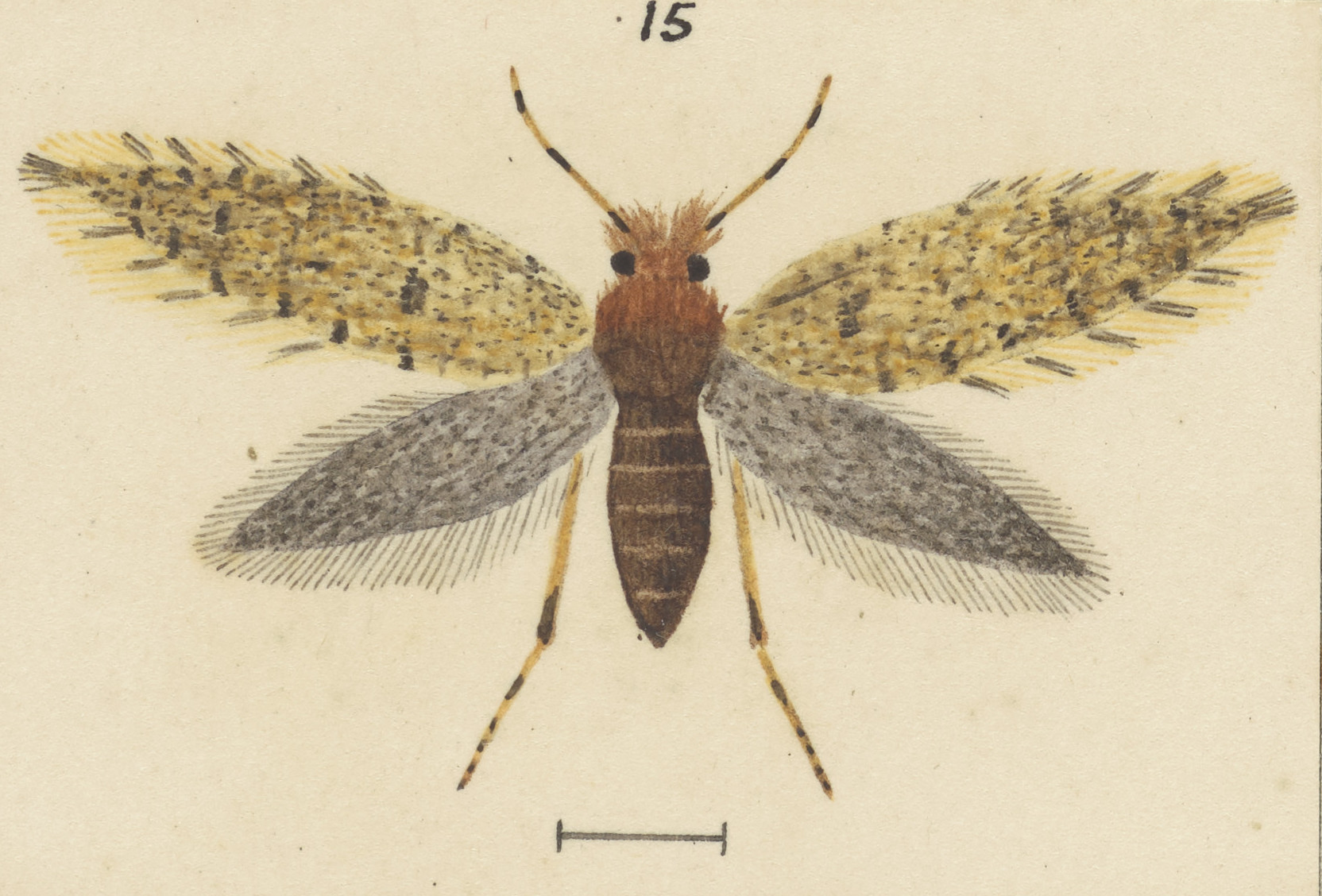
Female

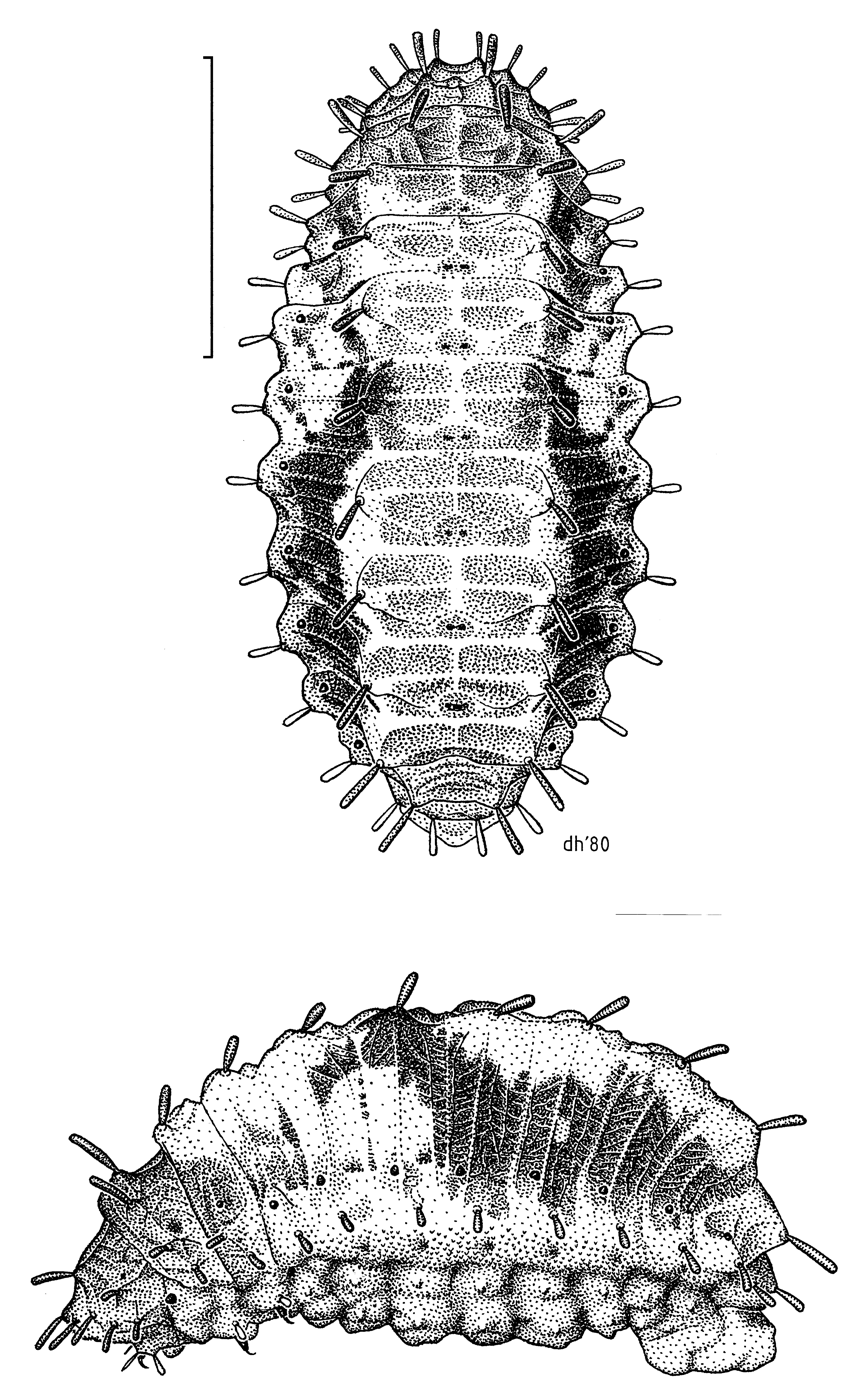
Sabatinca demissa larva

The larvae are small in size with a mature larva being only 2.5 mm in length. It is coloured pale green and has darker green to black patches on the posterior portion of its body.

Philpott described the adults of this species as follows:

♀. 6-5 mm. Head ochreous, with a dense spreading frontal tuft of long coarse hair. Antennae ochreous, with broad blackish bands at base, at 1/2, and before apex. Thorax ochreous. Abdomen fuscous-grey. Legs ochreous, tarsi annulated with blackish. Forewings rather broad, apex broadly pointed; ochreous irrorated with dark fuscous; three or four incomplete black strigae on apical 1/4: cilia ochreous, with a black bar marking apex of the wing. Hindwings and cilia grey-fuscous.

This yellow-brown coloured species has a wingspan of approximately 6.5 mm. In 1923 Philpott published a paper where he attempted to find differences between the species within the Sabatinca genus by studying the venation of their hindwings. This species does not have a long-distance pheromone communication system. Its nearest living relative is S. incongruella which is found in the northern parts of the South Island.

== Distribution ==
S. demissa is endemic to New Zealand and is found in the northern half of the North Island.

== Behaviour ==
This species is on the wing from the middle of November until the beginning of January. Adults are day flying but prefer to inhabit areas where the light is filtered through a leafy canopy rather than directly sunlit areas.

== Host species ==
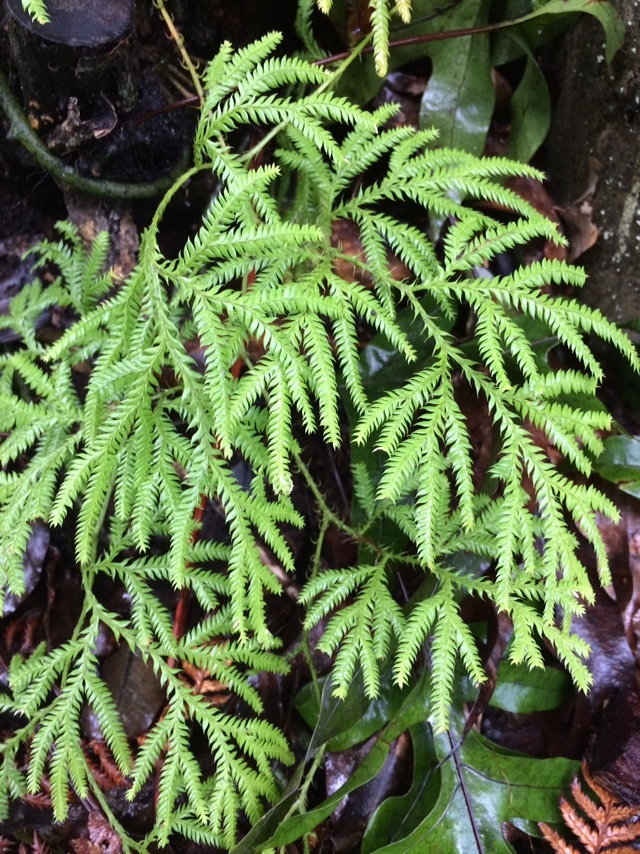
Lycopodium volubile

The larvae of this species feed on leafy types of liverwort. The adults of this species feed on the spores of fertile cones of Lycopodium volubile and Lycopodium scariosum.
