= Lycopodium densum =

Lycopodium densum may refer to one of two species of fern:

- Lycopodium densum Labill. is an illegitimate synonym of Pseudolycopodium densum (Rothm.) Holub
- Lycopodium densum Lam. is a synonym of Huperzia selago (L.) Bernh. ex Schrank & Mart.
