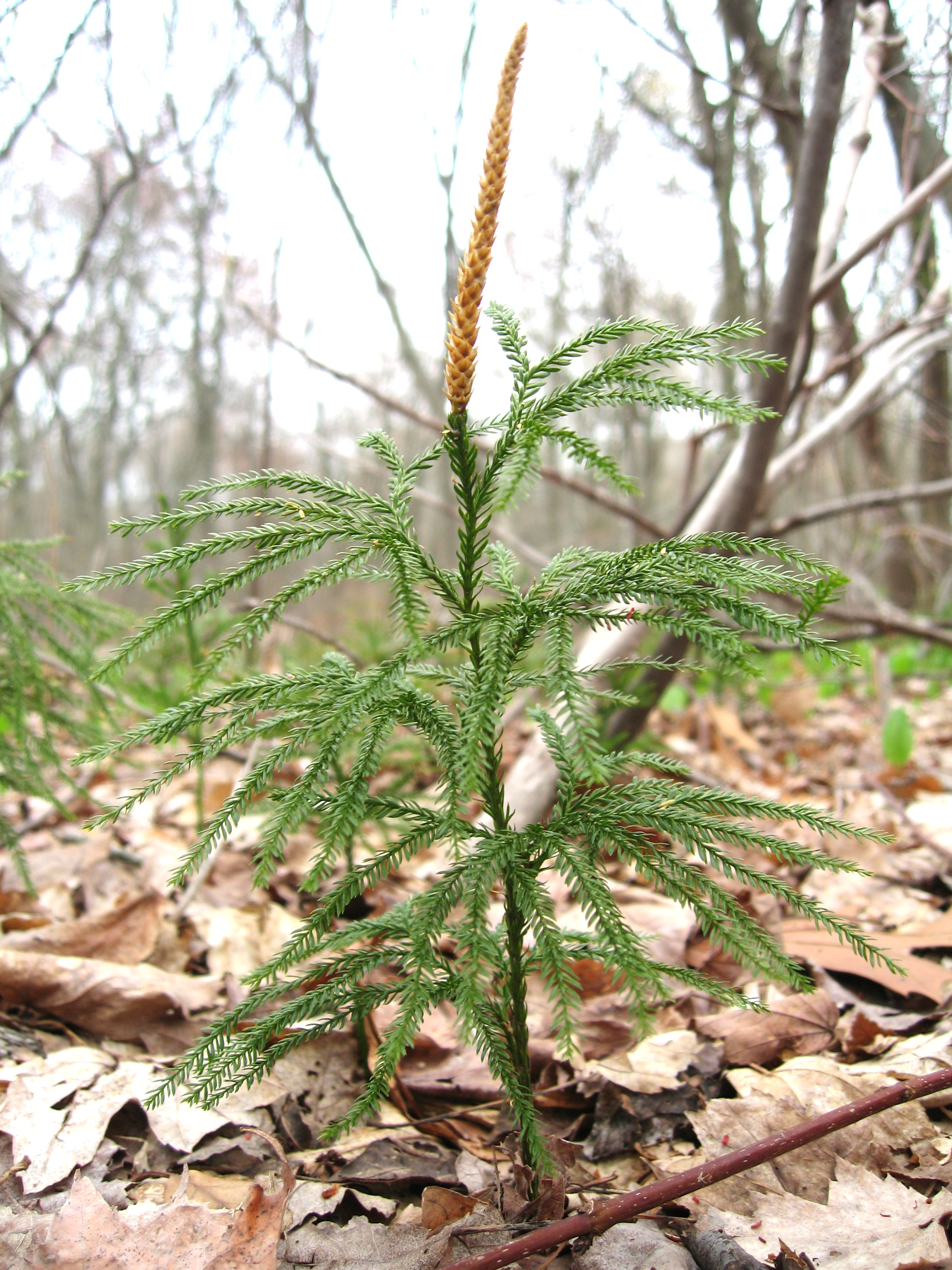
- A mature aerial shoot

Conservation status
- Secure (NatureServe)

Scientific classification
- Kingdom: Plantae
- Clade: Tracheophytes
- Clade: Lycophytes
- Class: Lycopodiopsida
- Order: Lycopodiales
- Family: Lycopodiaceae
- Genus: Dendrolycopodium
- Species: D. obscurum

Binomial name
- Dendrolycopodium obscurum (L.) A.Haines
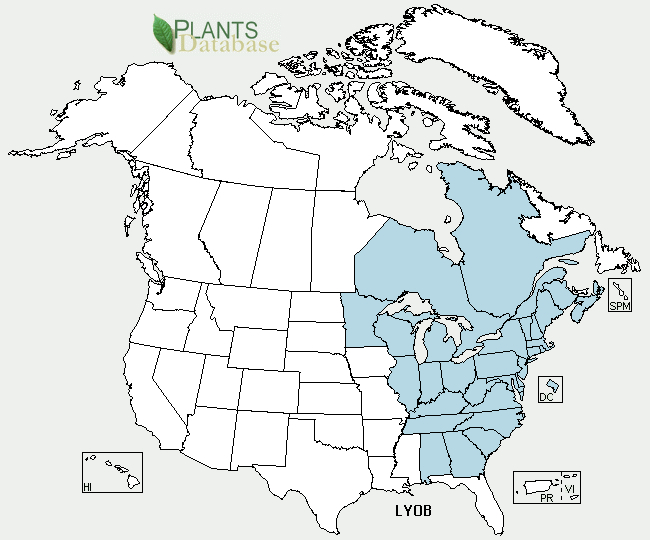
- Native range; also allegedly introduced to Alaska

Synonyms
- Lycopodium obscurum L.

= Dendrolycopodium obscurum =

Species of spore-bearing plant

Dendrolycopodium obscurum, synonym Lycopodium obscurum, commonly called rare clubmoss, ground pine, or princess pine, is a North American species of clubmoss in the family Lycopodiaceae. It is a close relative of other species such as D. dendroideum and D. hickeyi, also treelike. It is native to the eastern United States and southeastern Canada from Georgia to Minnesota to Nova Scotia. It grows in the understory of temperate coniferous and deciduous forests, where it is involved in seral secondary succession, growing in clonal colonies some years after disturbance has occurred. It has also been found in Japan, Taiwan, Korea, Russian Far East, and northeastern China.

== Description ==
Dendrolycopodium obscurum is known for the superficial resemblance of its sporophyte to various conifers. However, its above-ground parts are rarely more than 15 cm (6 inches) tall. Its main stem is actually a subterranean, creeping rhizome, which grows about 6 cm (2.4 inches) below ground. Several aerial shoots branch off of the rhizome, which also branch dichotomously several times, giving D. obscurum its distinctive appearance. Fertile shoots possess sessile strobili, borne at the tops of their main axes and sometimes at the tips of dominant lateral branches. The leaves are microphylls, each containing only a single vein and measuring less than 1 cm (0.4 inches) long. Two types of microphylls are formed, green trophophylls that cover most of the aerial shoots, and yellow to tan sporophylls that form the strobili, and contain the sporangia. D. obscurum reproduces sexually via spores and also vegetatively, through its rhizome.

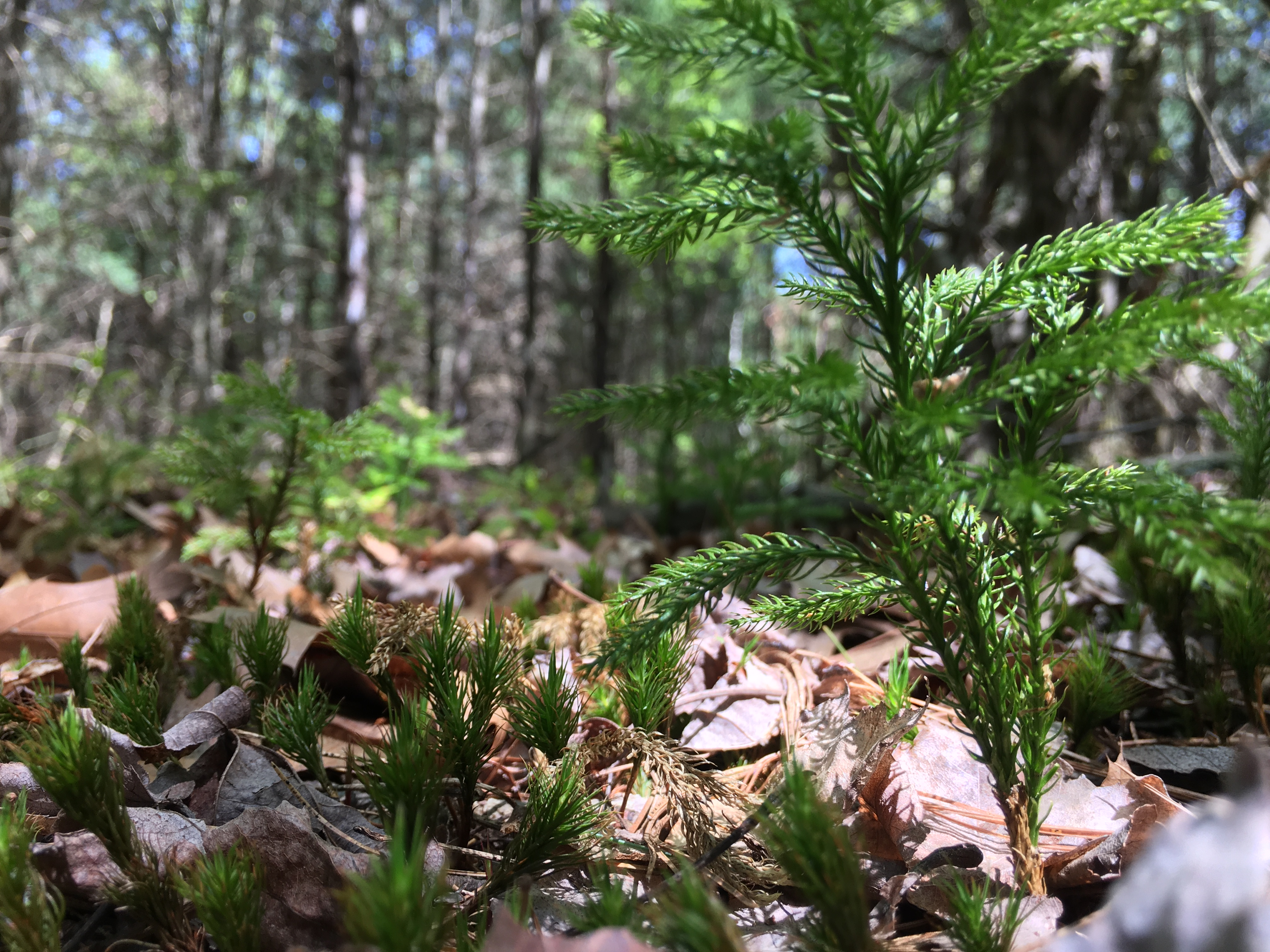

The gametophyte of D. obscurum is disc shaped prothallus, measuring an average of 1.5 cm (0.6 inches) in diameter. It closely resembles other gametophytes of Lycopodium and related genera, so it cannot be identified by gametophyte alone. Doing so would be difficult nonetheless, as this type of gametophyte grows only underground, years after a disturbance has taken place. Therefore, the compact soil caused by repeated human traffic would disturb these areas, causing D. obscurum spores not to germinate and existing gametophytes to be damaged or killed.

=== Identification ===
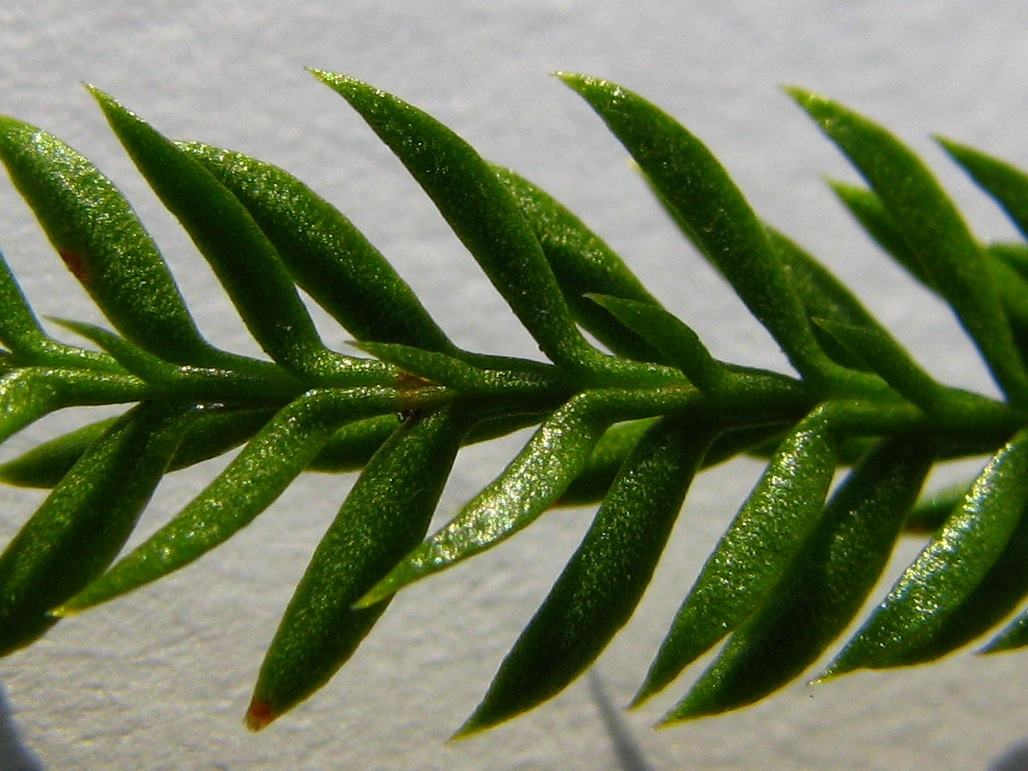
Closeup of underside of a lateral branch

Identifying D. obscurum in the wild can be difficult without prior study, because it is not only relatively rare, but shares much of its morphology with D. dendroideum and D. hickeyi. However, it can be identified with the naked eye by observing its leaves. Below its first branch, the microphylls of D. obscurum are tightly packed to the axis, while those of D. dendroideum are fully spread down to the soil. The leaves on lateral branches of D. dendroideum and D. hickeyi are evenly shaped and distributed, while they are pressed into the horizontal plane in D. obscurum, with the underside leaves being much shorter than all others.

=== Growth pattern ===
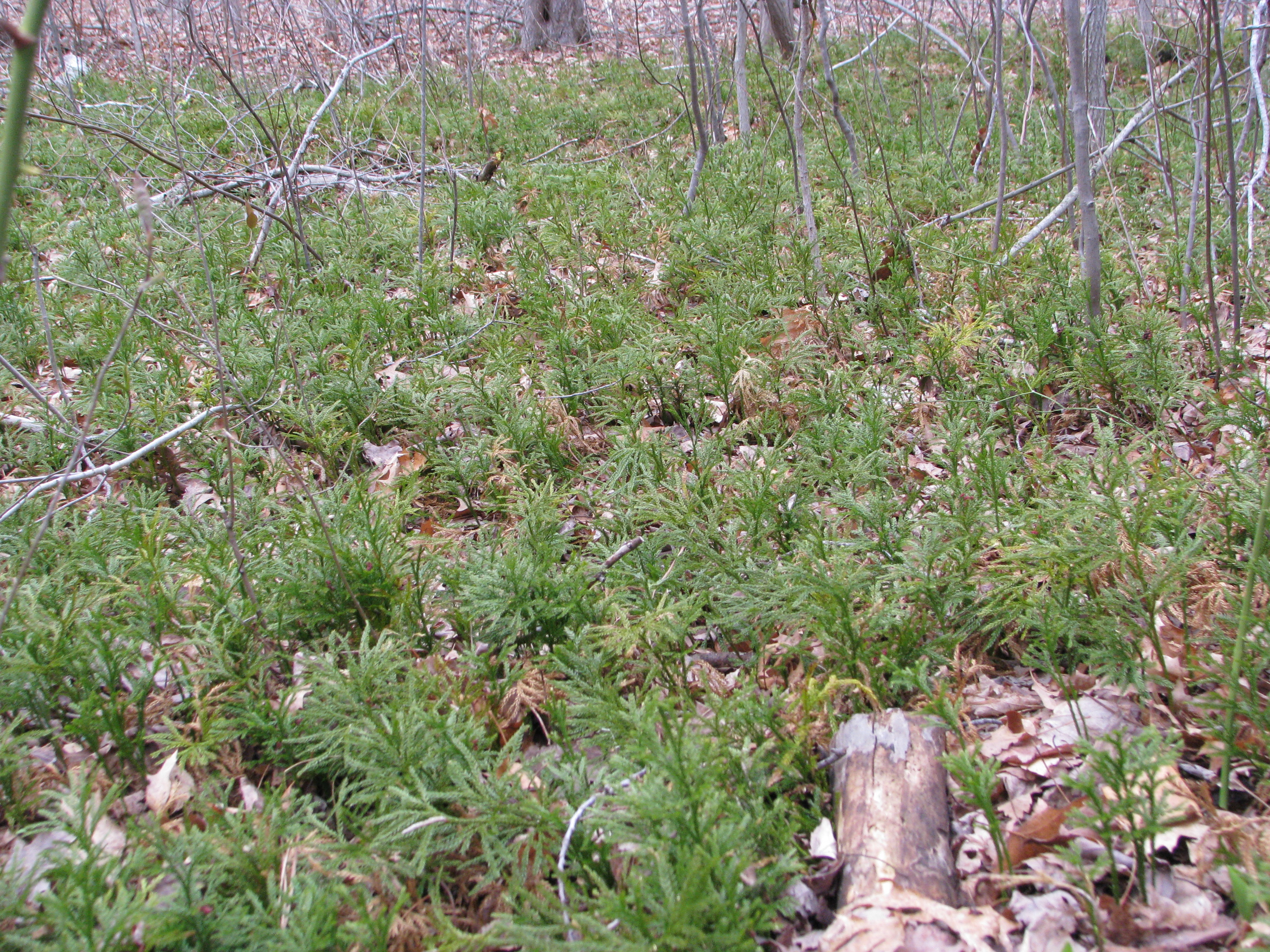
Growing in a stand

The rhizome of D. obscurum typically produces only one upright shoot per year and grows in a single direction. In the beginning of a growing season, the rhizome grows a few centimeters and then forms one branch at a 90° angle, alternating sides each year, which remains only millimeters in length. It then grows another couple of centimeters and then again branches off to the same side to form an aerial shoot. The rhizome branch produced each year is usually very weak and dies the next, but serves as a reserve rhizome apex, with the potential to become a new main rhizome. This happens if the plant is especially productive, or more frequently if the tip of the main rhizome is damaged so that it cannot grow. When a new main rhizome is formed, it makes a second 90° turn so that it is growing in the same direction as the rhizome from which it came. All underground branching occurs parallel to the ground, so upright shoots must then orient themselves appropriately in order to emerge from the soil.

Every year, a main rhizome produces only one aerial shoot, but in the case of a plant with multiple main rhizomes a new shoot is produced from each. The age of a shoot corresponds to the layers of compressed microphylls in its stem, caused by growth halting each winter, the same way as tree rings are formed. Shoot morphology can also be used to estimate their ages. First year shoots are unbranched and usually do not penetrate the soil surface. Second year shoots undergo rapid growth, usually reaching near their final heights, and forming several systems of lateral branches. Branching occurs only in the second, and sometimes third years. Strobili can be formed as early as the second growing season, but usually begin to be produced in the third. Strobilus production can continue through the fourth year, and shoots die in either the fourth or fifth year.

== Taxonomy ==
The genus Dendrolycopodium is accepted in the Pteridophyte Phylogeny Group classification of 2016 (PPG I), but not in other classifications, which submerge the genus in Lycopodium.

== Uses and conservation ==
Historically, Dendrolycopodium obscurum has been harvested from the wild for use as Christmas greens for wreaths, as well as the use of its spores for flash powder. While flash powder is now practically obsolete, the harvest of D. obscurum has caused it to become threatened in several areas, leading Indiana and New York to declare it protected by state law. When harvesting legally, it is recommended to cut the shoots using shears to minimize rhizome damage, alternate sites every year, and select only individuals possessing strobili with open sporophylls. This ensures that immature shoots are not harvested, and will be allowed an attempt at reproduction.
