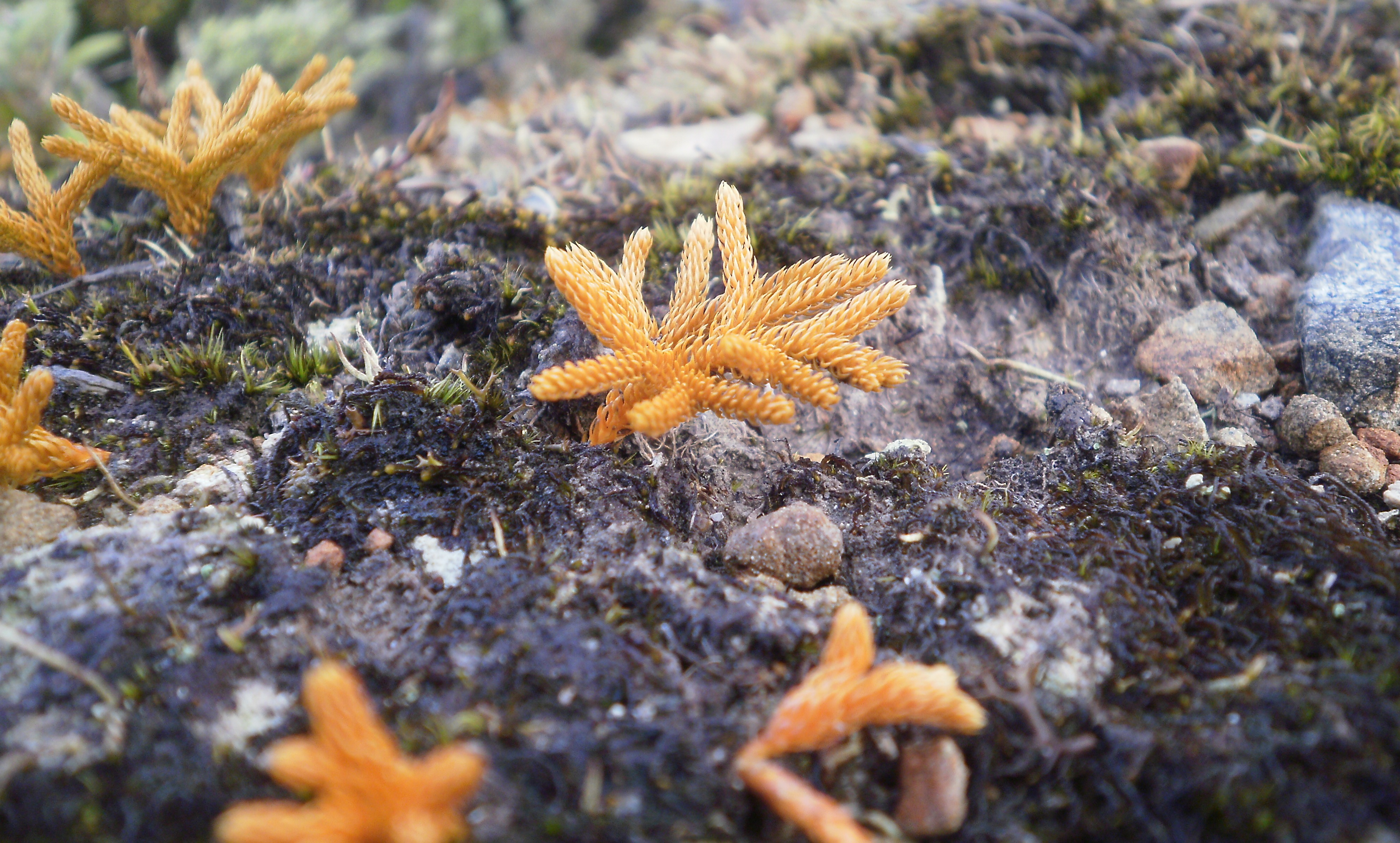

Scientific classification
- Kingdom: Plantae
- Clade: Tracheophytes
- Clade: Lycophytes
- Class: Lycopodiopsida
- Order: Lycopodiales
- Family: Lycopodiaceae
- Genus: Austrolycopodium
- Species: A. fastigiatum

Binomial name
- Austrolycopodium fastigiatum (R.Br.) Holub

Synonyms
- Lycopodium arcitenensis Herter; Lycopodium berggrenii (Herter ex Nessel) Herter; Lycopodium clavatum var. fastigiatum (R.Br.) Benth.; Lycopodium curvifolium Colenso; Lycopodium decurrens Colenso; Lycopodium fastigiatum R.Br.; Lycopodium scopulosum Colenso

= Austrolycopodium fastigiatum =

Species of spore-bearing plant

Austrolycopodium fastigiatum, synonym Lycopodium fastigiatum, commonly known as alpine club moss or mountain club moss, is a species of club moss native to New Zealand and Australia. The genus Austrolycopodium is accepted in the Pteridophyte Phylogeny Group classification of 2016 (PPG I), but not in other classifications which submerge the genus in Lycopodium.

Austrolycopodium fastigiatum has an upright, much branched and conifer-like appearance, and can grow up to 10 cm (4 in) high. It is widespread across New Zealand including Stewart, Chatham, Adams, Auckland, and Campbell Islands. It has also been found in the Australian States of Tasmania, Victoria, and New South Wales. It grows in mountainous, alpine areas to scrubland. In cold conditions it can have a bright orange appearance.
