= Austrolycopodium erectum =

Scientific classification
- Kingdom: Plantae
- Clade: Tracheophytes
- Clade: Lycophytes
- Class: Lycopodiopsida
- Order: Lycopodiales
- Family: Lycopodiaceae
- Genus: Austrolycopodium
- Species: A. erectum

Binomial name
- Austrolycopodium erectum (Phil.) Holub

Synonyms
- Lycopodium magellanicum var. erectum (Phil.) Looser; Lycopodium looseri Herter; Lycopodium erectum Phil.

Species of spore-bearing plant

Austrolycopodium erectum is a species in the club moss family Lycopodiaceae. The genus Austrolycopodium is accepted in the Pteridophyte Phylogeny Group classification of 2016 (PPG I), but not in other classifications which submerge the genus in Lycopodium. The species is native to Bolivia, Chile and Argentina.
