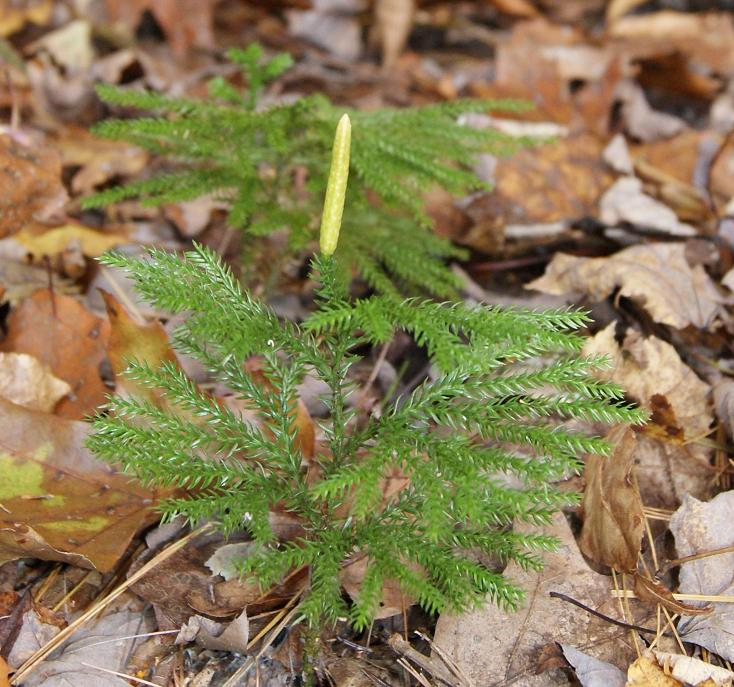
- Dendrolycopodium dendroideum

Scientific classification
- Kingdom: Plantae
- Clade: Tracheophytes
- Clade: Lycophytes
- Class: Lycopodiopsida
- Order: Lycopodiales
- Family: Lycopodiaceae
- Subfamily: Lycopodioideae
- Genus: Dendrolycopodium; A. Haines

Species
- See text.

Synonyms
- Lycopodium sect. Obscura (Rothm.) Holub

= Dendrolycopodium =

Genus of spore-bearing plants

The genus Dendrolycopodium is a clubmoss genus in the family Lycopodiaceae. In the Pteridophyte Phylogeny Group classification of 2016 (PPG I), it is placed in the subfamily Lycopodioideae. Some sources do not recognize the genus, sinking it into Lycopodium. It is treated as section Obscura when retained within Lycopodium. The genus includes a discrete group of plants with similar morphologies. All have erect to semi-erect, branched stems.

== Species ==
As of June 2024, the Checklist of Ferns and Lycophytes of the World recognized the following species:

- Dendrolycopodium dendroideum (Michx.) A.Haines – northern North America, eastern Asia
- Dendrolycopodium hickeyi (W.H.Wagner, Beitel & R.C.Moran) A.Haines – northeastern North America
- Dendrolycopodium juniperoideum (Sw.) A.Haines – northeast Asia (central Siberia)
- Dendrolycopodium obscurum (L.) A.Haines – northeast North America, northeast Asia
- Dendrolycopodium verticale (Li Bing Zhang) Li Bing Zhang & X.M.Zhou - China, Himalayas
