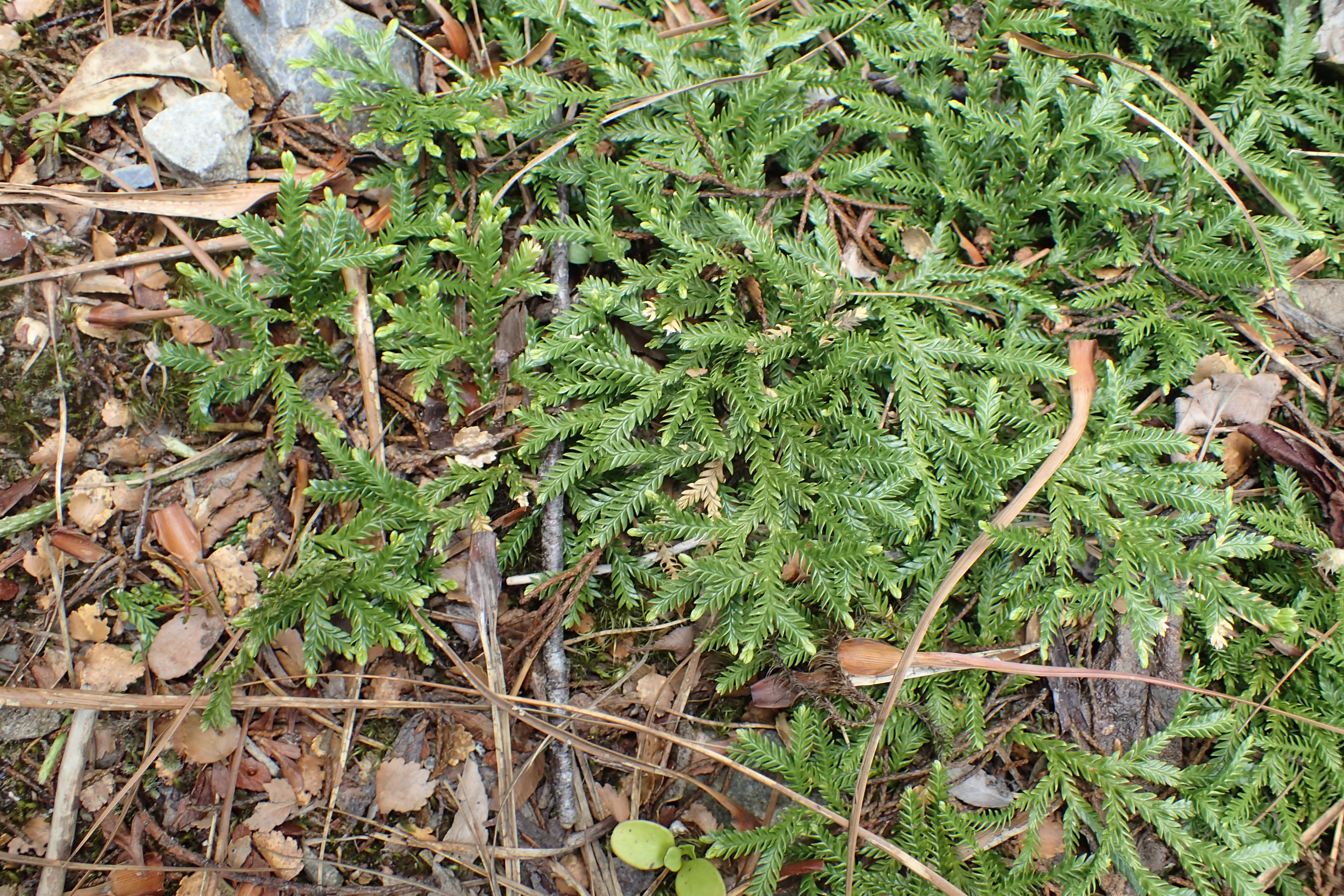

Scientific classification
- Kingdom: Plantae
- Clade: Tracheophytes
- Clade: Lycophytes
- Class: Lycopodiopsida
- Order: Lycopodiales
- Family: Lycopodiaceae
- Genus: Diphasium
- Species: D. scariosum

Binomial name
- Diphasium scariosum (G.Forster) Rothm.

Synonyms
- Diphasium decurrens (R.Br.) Holub; Lycopodium decurrens R.Br.; Lycopodium distans Colenso; Lycopodium lessonianum A.Rich.; Lycopodium scariosum G.Forst.; Stachygynandrum scariosum (G.Forster) P.Beauv.

= Diphasium scariosum =

Species of spore-bearing plant

Diphasium scariosum, synonym Lycopodium scariosum, commonly known as spreading clubmoss or creeping club moss, is a species in the club moss family Lycopodiaceae. The genus Diphasium is accepted in the Pteridophyte Phylogeny Group classification of 2016 (PPG I), but not in other classifications which submerge the genus in Lycopodium.

== Description ==
Diphasium scariosum has main stems that lie flat along the ground and which spread to more than a meter long. The branchlets are 0.5 m tall, have two different surfaces and are very branched. The leaves are dimorphic and are yellowish green. The first leaf form occurs on the upper leaves of the plant, which are in two alternating rows and have been flattened into one plane. The upper leaves are 3–5 mm long, 1–1.5 mm wide and are oval. The second leaf form are the lower leaves which are in two rows but have not been flattened into one plane. These leaves are scale-like, are only 0.2 mm long and have translucent membranous dilated tips. D. scariosum has distinctive colouring with big fluorescent spots throughout. This is unusual for a club moss as not many club moss species have 5-O-glucosides of flavones, which cause these bright fluorescent spots. D. scariosum has solitary erect strobili which grow 1-3 cm long. The sporophylls overlap each other, are oval, straw-like, and have membranous tips. Genera of the Lycopodioideae subfamily, which includes D. scariosum, differs from the Lycopodielloideae sensu genera by the presence of pedunculate strobili with modified sporophylls in them.

== Natural global range ==
Diphasium scariosum occurs naturally in the Philippines, New Guinea, Borneo, Australia, New Zealand and the Subanatarctic islands. In New Zealand, Diphasium scariosum is found throughout the North Island but is less common in Northland. It is also found throughout the South Island.

== Habitat ==
Diphasium scariosum is found in coastal to subalpine environments in mossy roadside banks, shrubland and peaty ground. D. scariosum prefers well-drained clay or peaty soils.

== Life cycle and phenology ==
Diphasium scariosum is a pteridophyte. When the spores are released from the sporophyll and the strobili, they can take seven or more years to turn into a gametophyte which can then survive for 10 or more years. The lifecycle of a Lycopodium species can take up to 20 years to complete. D. scariosum reproduces sexually in unfavourable conditions or asexually in favourable conditions. When D. scariosum is not producing spores, it grows laterally along the ground.

== Diet and foraging ==
Diphasium scariosum occurs on peaty, nutrient-rich soils. D. scariosum requires soils with high nutrient contents from dead organic matter but does not tolerate very wet soil.

== Predators, parasites, and diseases ==
Clubmosses are eaten by slugs and snails, and is parasitised by fungi, although this has not yet been documented for D. scariosum. D. scariosum was found to be infected with mycorrhizal fungi, which likely benefits the plant.
