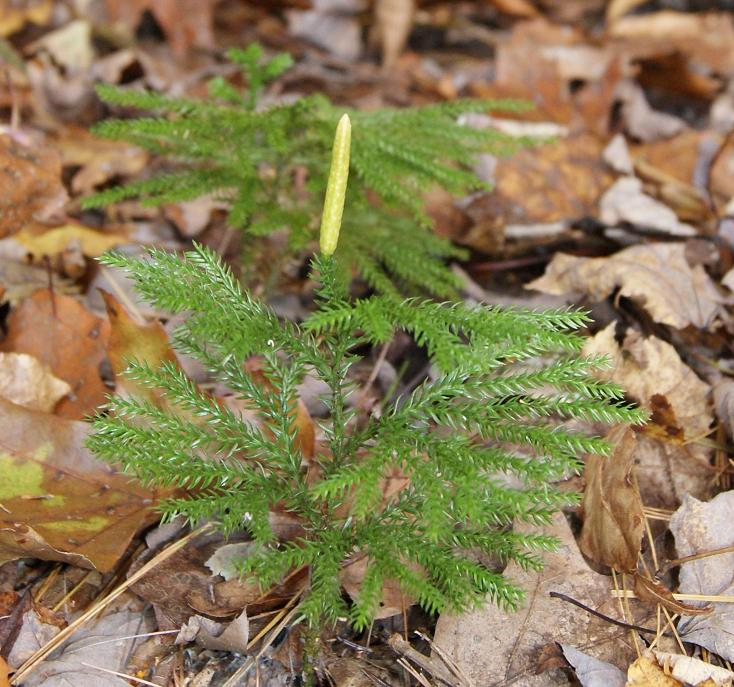

Conservation status
- Secure (NatureServe)

Scientific classification
- Kingdom: Plantae
- Clade: Tracheophytes
- Clade: Lycophytes
- Class: Lycopodiopsida
- Order: Lycopodiales
- Family: Lycopodiaceae
- Genus: Dendrolycopodium
- Species: D. dendroideum

Binomial name
- Dendrolycopodium dendroideum (Michx.) A. Haines
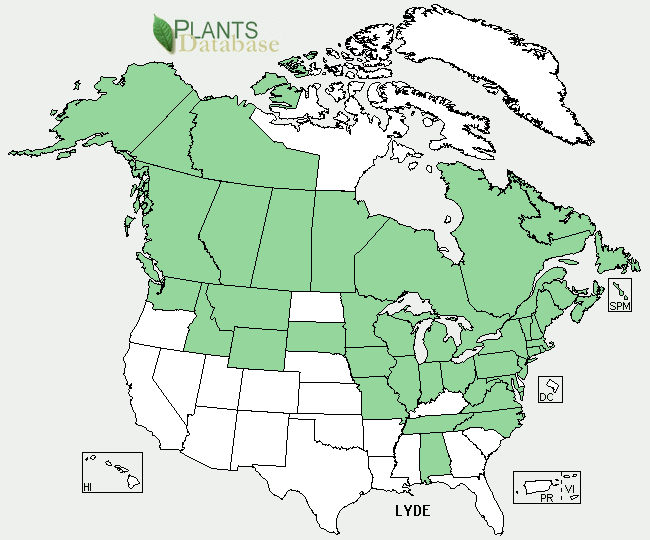

Synonyms
- Lepidotis dendroidea (Michx.) P. Beauv.; Lycopodium dendroideum Michx.; Lycopodium obscurum f. dendroideum (Michx.) H.L. Blomq. & Correll; Lycopodium obscurum var. dendroideum (Michx.) D.C. Eaton

= Dendrolycopodium dendroideum =

Species of spore-bearing plant

Dendrolycopodium dendroideum, synonym Lycopodium dendroideum, known as tree groundpine, is a North American species of clubmoss. It is part of a complex of species colloquially known as groundpine, which taxa were formerly lumped into the species Lycopodium obscurum. The species is native to Russia and also to the colder parts of North America (all states and provinces in Canada except Nunavut; northern and east-central United States including Alaska). The genus Dendrolycopodium is accepted in the Pteridophyte Phylogeny Group classification of 2016 (PPG I), but not in other classifications, which submerge the genus in Lycopodium.

Dendrolycopodium dendroideum prefers humus-rich, sandy, moist but not completely saturated soils. It is very similar to D. obscurum except for side shoots that are round in cross-section rather than flat, and having leaves all the same size.

== Uses ==
Historically, this and other related clubmosses had been collected for decorative Christmas greenery. Overharvesting clubmosses destroys the slow growing, increasingly rare plant. The spore of this species was also collected as lycopodium powder for use in early photography, although this was not the preferred species for the purpose.
