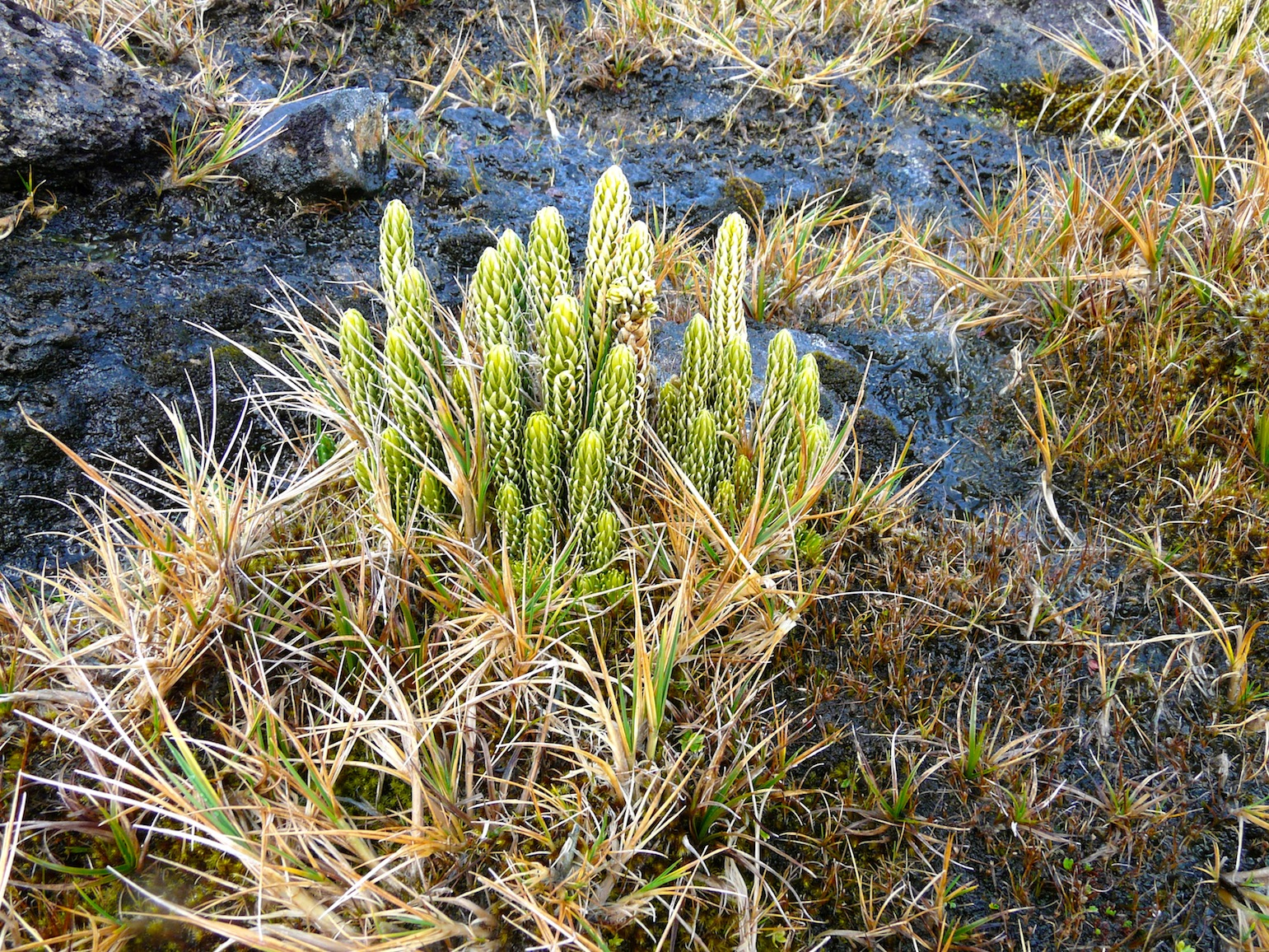

Scientific classification
- Kingdom: Plantae
- Clade: Embryophytes
- Clade: Tracheophytes
- Clade: Lycophytes
- Class: Lycopodiopsida
- Order: Lycopodiales
- Family: Lycopodiaceae
- Genus: Austrolycopodium
- Species: A. magellanicum

Binomial name
- Austrolycopodium magellanicum (P.Beauv.) Holub

Synonyms
- Lycopodium clavatum var. magellanicum (P.Beauv.) Hook.f.; Lycopodium magellanicum (P.Beauv.) Sw.; Lycopodium pichinchense Hook.; Lycopodium spurium Willd.; Lycopodium uranii Herter

= Austrolycopodium magellanicum =

Species of spore-bearing plant

Austrolycopodium magellanicum, synonym Lycopodium magellanicum, the Magellanic clubmoss, is a species of vascular plant in the club moss family Lycopodiaceae. The genus Austrolycopodium is accepted in the Pteridophyte Phylogeny Group classification of 2016 (PPG I), but not in other classifications which submerge the genus in Lycopodium.

The species grows in the mountains of Latin America from Costa Rica and the Dominican Republic south as far as Tierra del Fuego, as well as a number of islands in the antarctic and subantarctic oceans (Tristan da Cunha, Gough Island, Amsterdam Island, South Georgia and the South Sandwich Islands, Falkland Islands, Juan Fernández Islands, Marion Island, Prince Edward Islands, Iles Crozet, Iles Kerguelen).

A number of natural products have been isolated from this plant, including magellanine, magellaninone, panticuline, acetyldihydrolycopodine, acetylfawcettiine, clavolonine (8b-hydroxylycopodine), deacetylfawcettiine, fawcettiine, lycopodine, lycodine, alpha-obscurine (2,3-dihydro-b-obscurine), and beta-obscurine. Some of the molecules within this class are known inhibitors of acetylcholinesterase (AChE).
