= Magellanine =

Names
- Preferred IUPAC name (4aS,6S,6aR,6bS,10aS,11aS)-6-Hydroxy-3,9-dimethyl-4,4a,5,6,6a,6b,7,8,9,10,10a,11-dodecahydro-1H-benzo[3a,4]pentaleno[2,1-c]pyridin-1-one

Identifiers
CAS Number	61273-75-4
3D model (JSmol)	Interactive image
ChemSpider	390919
PubChem CID	442489
UNII	BLX5LW8WRA
CompTox Dashboard (EPA)	DTXSID90976765
- InChI: InChI=1S/C17H25NO2/c1-10-5-12-7-14(19)16-13-3-4-18(2)9-11(13)8-17(12,16)15(20)6-10/h6,11-14,16,19H,3-5,7-9H2,1-2H3/t11-,12+,13+,14+,16+,17-/m1/s1 Key: ADRPSBGLUHNVOU-INSRFAMQSA-N; InChI=1/C17H25NO2/c1-10-5-12-7-14(19)16-13-3-4-18(2)9-11(13)8-17(12,16)15(20)6-10/h6,11-14,16,19H,3-5,7-9H2,1-2H3/t11-,12+,13+,14+,16+,17-/m1/s1 Key: ADRPSBGLUHNVOU-INSRFAMQBF
- SMILES: O=C1/C=C(/C)C[C@@H]2[C@@]14[C@H]([C@@H](O)C2)[C@@H]3[C@@H](CN(C)CC3)C4

Properties
Chemical formula	C_{17}H_{25}NO_{2}
Molar mass	275.392 g·mol^{−1}
Melting point	165 to 166 °C (329 to 331 °F; 438 to 439 K)
- Except where otherwise noted, data are given for materials in their standard state (at 25 °C [77 °F], 100 kPa). verify (what is ?) Infobox references

(−)-Magellanine is a member of the Lycopodium alkaloid class of natural products. It was isolated from the club moss Lycopodium magellanicum in 1976. It has been synthesized five times, with the first synthesis having been completed by the Larry E. Overman group at the University of California, Irvine in 1993. It has also been synthesized by the Leo Paquette group in 1993 at Ohio State University, the Chun-Chen Liao group in 2002 at National Tsing Hua University, the Miyuki Ishikazi and Tamiko Takahashi groups in 2005 at the Josai International University and Tokyo University of Science, and the Chisato Mukai group in 2007 at the Kanazawa University. One partial synthesis was completed by the A. I. Meyers group in 1995 at Colorado State University.

Biosynthetically, it is thought to have been derived from lysine. This was determined by conducting feeding studies of radiolabeled precursors.
