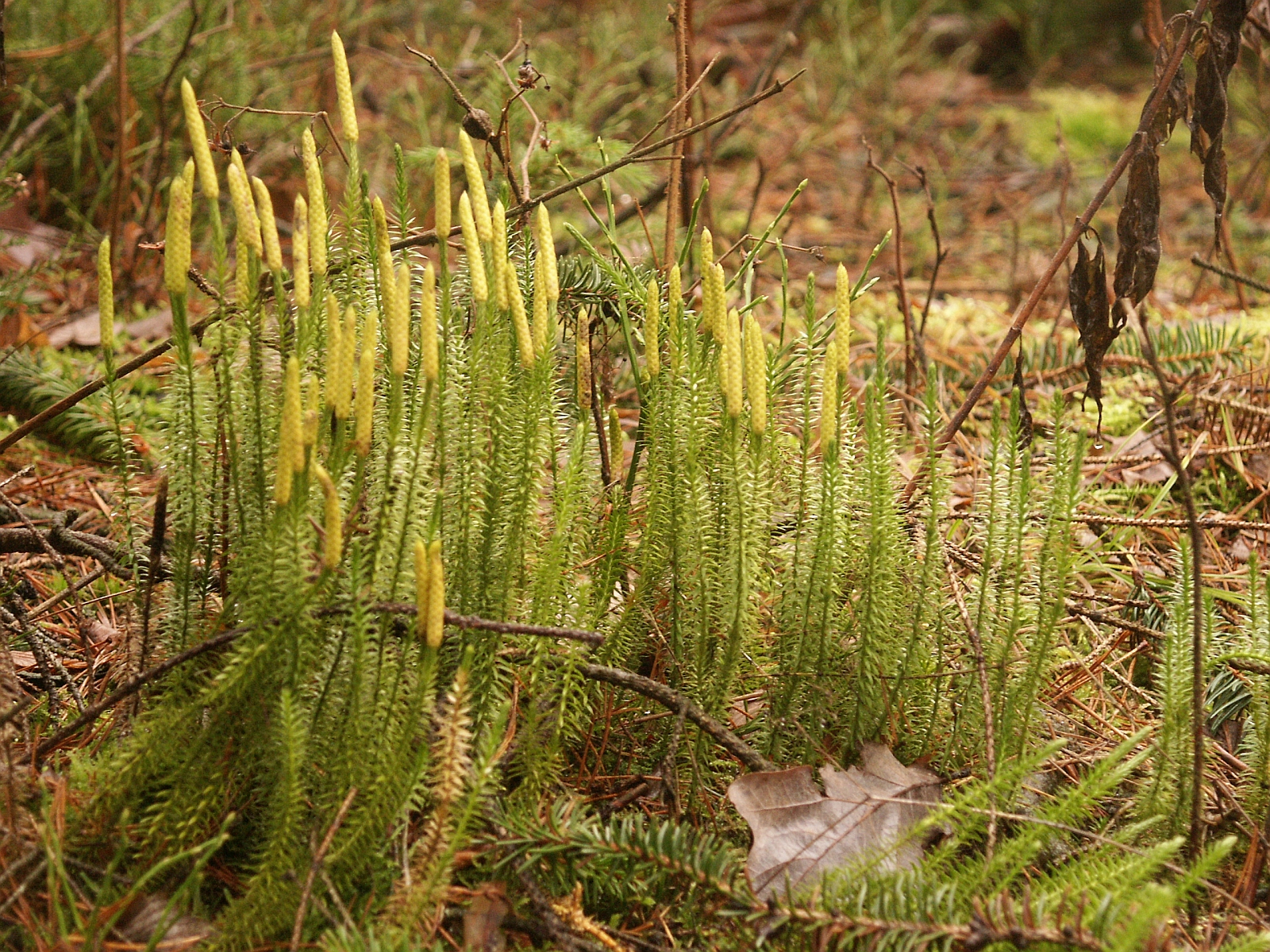
- Spinulum annotinum

Scientific classification
- Kingdom: Plantae
- Clade: Tracheophytes
- Clade: Lycophytes
- Class: Lycopodiopsida
- Order: Lycopodiales
- Family: Lycopodiaceae
- Subfamily: Lycopodioideae
- Genus: Spinulum; A.Haines

Species
- See text.

= Spinulum =

Genus of spore-bearing plants

Spinulum is a genus of club mosses in the family Lycopodiaceae. In the Pteridophyte Phylogeny Group classification of 2016 (PPG I), it is placed in the subfamily Lycopodioideae. Some sources do not recognize the genus, sinking it into Lycopodium. Spinulum annotinum is widespread in the temperate Northern Hemisphere.

== Species ==
As of June 2024, the Checklist of Ferns and Lycophytes of the World recognized two species:

- Spinulum annotinum (L.) A.Haines
- Spinulum lioui Li Bing Zhang & H.He
