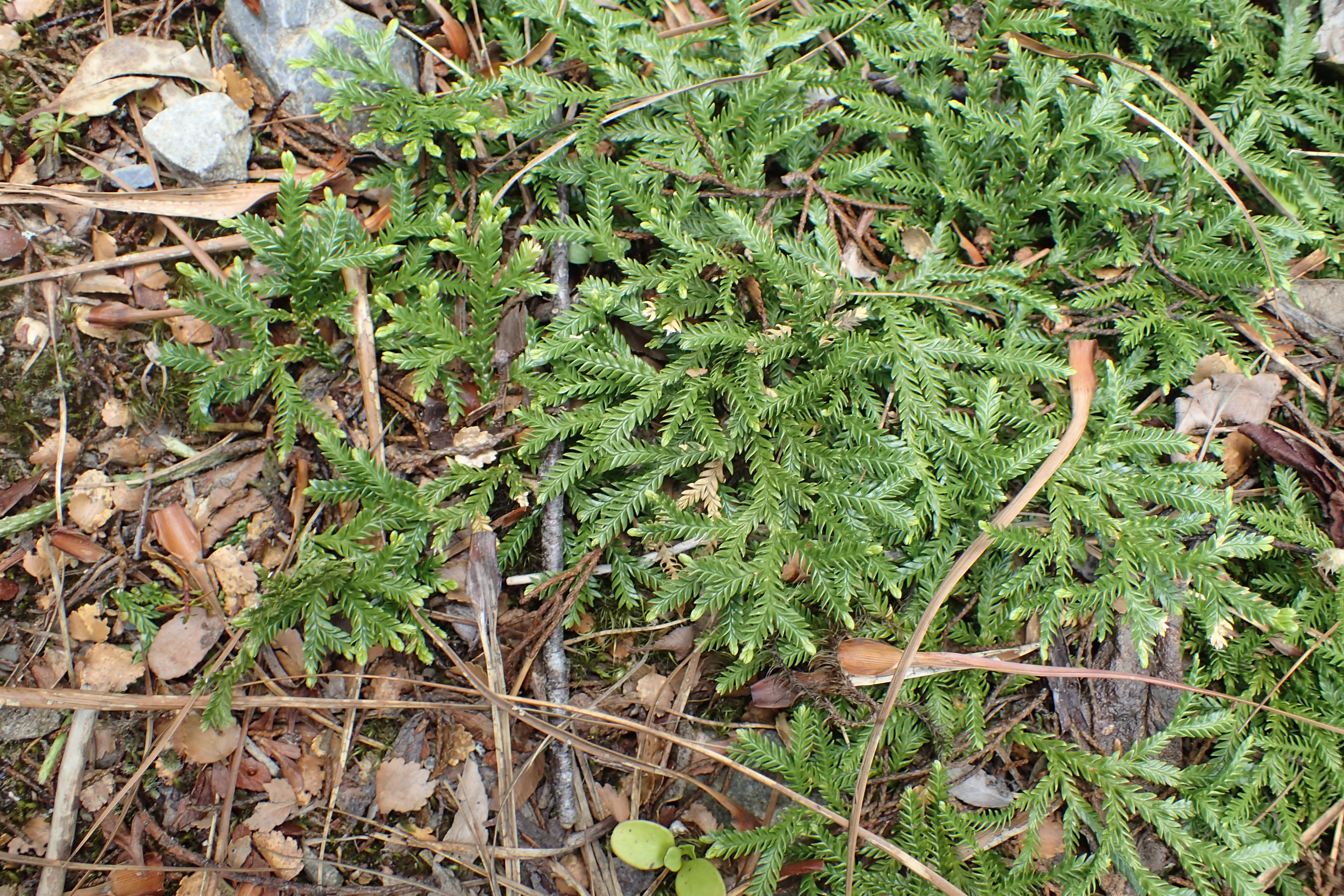
- Diphasium scariosum

Scientific classification
- Kingdom: Plantae
- Clade: Tracheophytes
- Clade: Lycophytes
- Class: Lycopodiopsida
- Order: Lycopodiales
- Family: Lycopodiaceae
- Subfamily: Lycopodioideae
- Genus: Diphasium; C.Presl ex Rothm.

Species
- See text.

= Diphasium =

Genus of spore-bearing plants

Diphasium is a genus of lycophytes in the family Lycopodiaceae. In the Pteridophyte Phylogeny Group classification of 2016 (PPG I), it is placed in the subfamily Lycopodioideae. Some sources do not recognize the genus, sinking it into Lycopodium, others include it in Diphasiastrum. Diphasium species are mostly native to the temperate southern hemisphere, but extend northwards into Central America and the Caribbean.

== Species ==
As of June 2024, the Checklist of Ferns and Lycophytes of the World recognized the following species:

- Diphasium gayanum (J.Rémy) Holub
- Diphasium jussiaei (Desv. ex Poir.) Rothm.
- Diphasium lawessonianum (B.Øllg.) B.Øllg.
- Diphasium scariosum (G.Forst.) Rothm.
