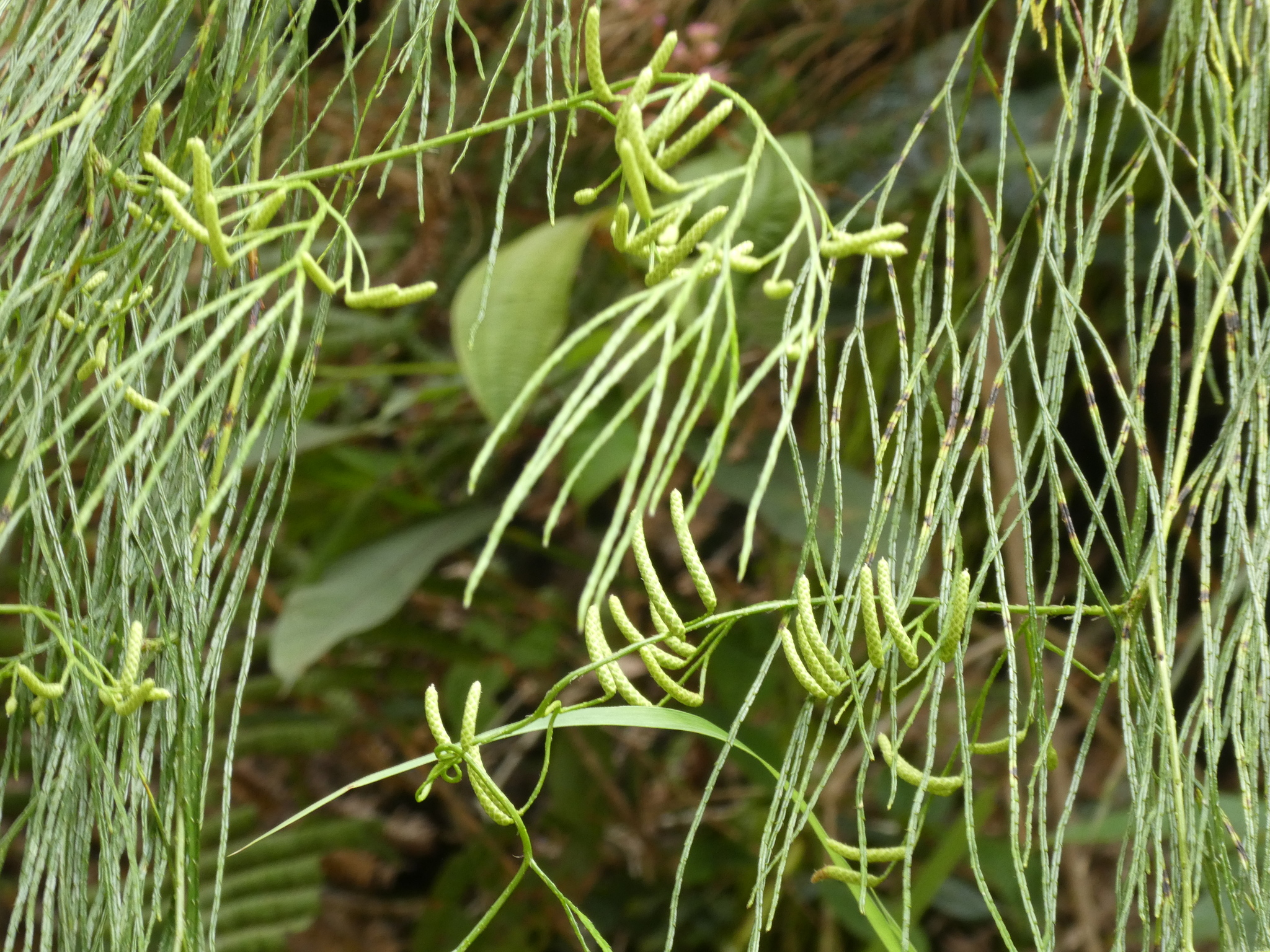
- Lycopodiastrum casuarinoides in China

Scientific classification
- Kingdom: Plantae
- Clade: Tracheophytes
- Clade: Lycophytes
- Class: Lycopodiopsida
- Order: Lycopodiales
- Family: Lycopodiaceae
- Genus: Lycopodiastrum; Holub ex R.D.Dixit
- Species: L. casuarinoides

Binomial name
- Lycopodiastrum casuarinoides (Spring) Holub ex R.D.Dixit

Synonyms
- Diphasium casuarinoides (Spring) J.P.Mandal & U.Sen; Lepidotis casuarinoides (Spring) Rothm.; Lycopodium casuarinoides Spring; Lycopodium comans Hook.f.; Lycopodium filicaule Hook.f.; Lycopodium jacobsonii Alderw.; Lycopodium leucolepis Jungh. & de Vriese; Lycopodium rubellum C.Presl

= Lycopodiastrum =

Genus of spore-bearing plants

Lycopodiastrum is a genus of lycophyte in the family Lycopodiaceae with only one species, Lycopodiastrum casuarinoides. In the Pteridophyte Phylogeny Group classification of 2016 (PPG I), the genus is placed in the subfamily Lycopodioideae. Some sources do not recognize the genus, sinking it into Lycopodium. Lycopodiastrum casuarinoides is native to south-eastern Asia, from Tibet through China to Japan in the north, and from Sumatra to Sulawesi in the south.
