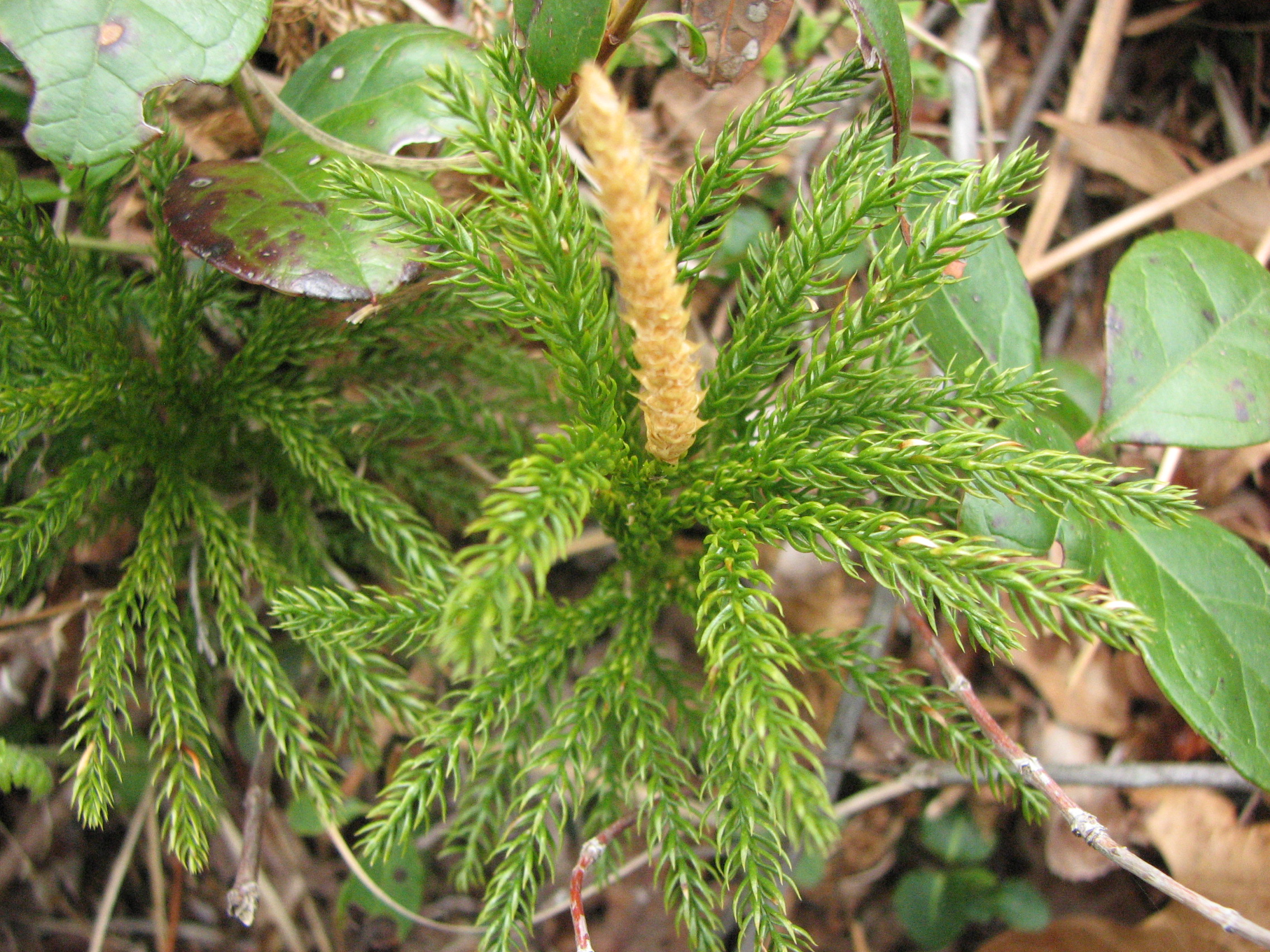

Scientific classification
- Kingdom: Plantae
- Clade: Tracheophytes
- Clade: Lycophytes
- Class: Lycopodiopsida
- Order: Lycopodiales
- Family: Lycopodiaceae
- Genus: Dendrolycopodium
- Species: D. hickeyi

Binomial name
- Dendrolycopodium hickeyi (W.H.Wagner, Beitel & R.C.Moran) A.Haines

Synonyms
- Lycopodium hickeyi W.H.Wagner, Beitel & R.C.Moran; Lycopodium obscurum var. isophyllum Hickey

= Dendrolycopodium hickeyi =

Species of spore-bearing plant native to eastern North America

Dendrolycopodium hickeyi (synonym Lycopodium hickeyi) known as Hickey's tree club-moss or Pennsylvania clubmoss, is a North American species of clubmoss in the family Lycopodiaceae. It is native to eastern and Central Canada (from Newfoundland to Ontario with isolated populations in Saskatchewan) and the eastern and north-central United States (from Maine west to Minnesota and south as far as Tennessee and North Carolina). The genus Dendrolycopodium is accepted in the Pteridophyte Phylogeny Group classification of 2016 (PPG I), but not in other classifications, which submerge the genus in a larger Lycopodium.

== Description ==
Similar to other members of the genus, the sporophyte of Dendrolycopodium hickeyi resembles the seedlings of some conifers. The upright sporophytes grow from subterranean horizontal stems, often causing tree club-mosses to be found in clusters. The upright sporophytes have small, green microphylls (leaves) extending from the ground to the tips of their branches (branches 4–7mm in diameter). These plants remain green throughout the winter and in their final year, they produce usually a single, unstalked (sessile) terminal strobilus from which spores are released.

=== Identification ===
Dendrolycopodium hickeyi is ostensibly very similar to Dendrolycopodium obscurum which overlaps with D. hickeyi in range. While D. obscurum has reduced leaves on the underside of the branches, D. hickeyi has leaves of equal length around the branches (as reflected by its former name, Lycopodium obscurum var. isophyllum: iso- [“equal”] + -phyllum [“leaf”]). D. hickeyi can be distinguished from D. dendroideum, which also has leaves of equal length around their branches, by the orientation of these leaves. D. hickeyi and D. obscurum both have a single rank of leaves on the top of the branches while D. dendroideum has leaves in ranks of two on the top of each branch. D. hickeyi also has leaves which are appressed to the stem below the first branches (unlike spreading leaves in D. dendroideum). The strobilus of D. hickeyi is also intermediate in length between D. obscurum and D. dendroideum.

== Range and Habitat ==
D. hickeyi is native across the northeastern United States and Eastern Canada.Its range overlaps with several other lycophytes, including D. obscurum and D. dendroideum, which were previously classified as varieties of each other.It can be found in dry or mesic conifer forests, as well as forest openings, and prefers sandy soil shaded light conditions.

== Taxonomy ==
The oldest name for the taxon is Lycopodium obscurum var. isophyllum. In elevating the plants from varietal level to species level, Wagner et al. opted to forgo the common (but not mandatory) custom of using the old varietal epithet as the new species epithet since D. hickeyi and D. dendroideum both have leaves of equal length around the branches. They chose instead the name Lycopodium hickeyi in honor of the pteridologist James Hickey who originally described the plant as L. obscurum var. isophyllum.
