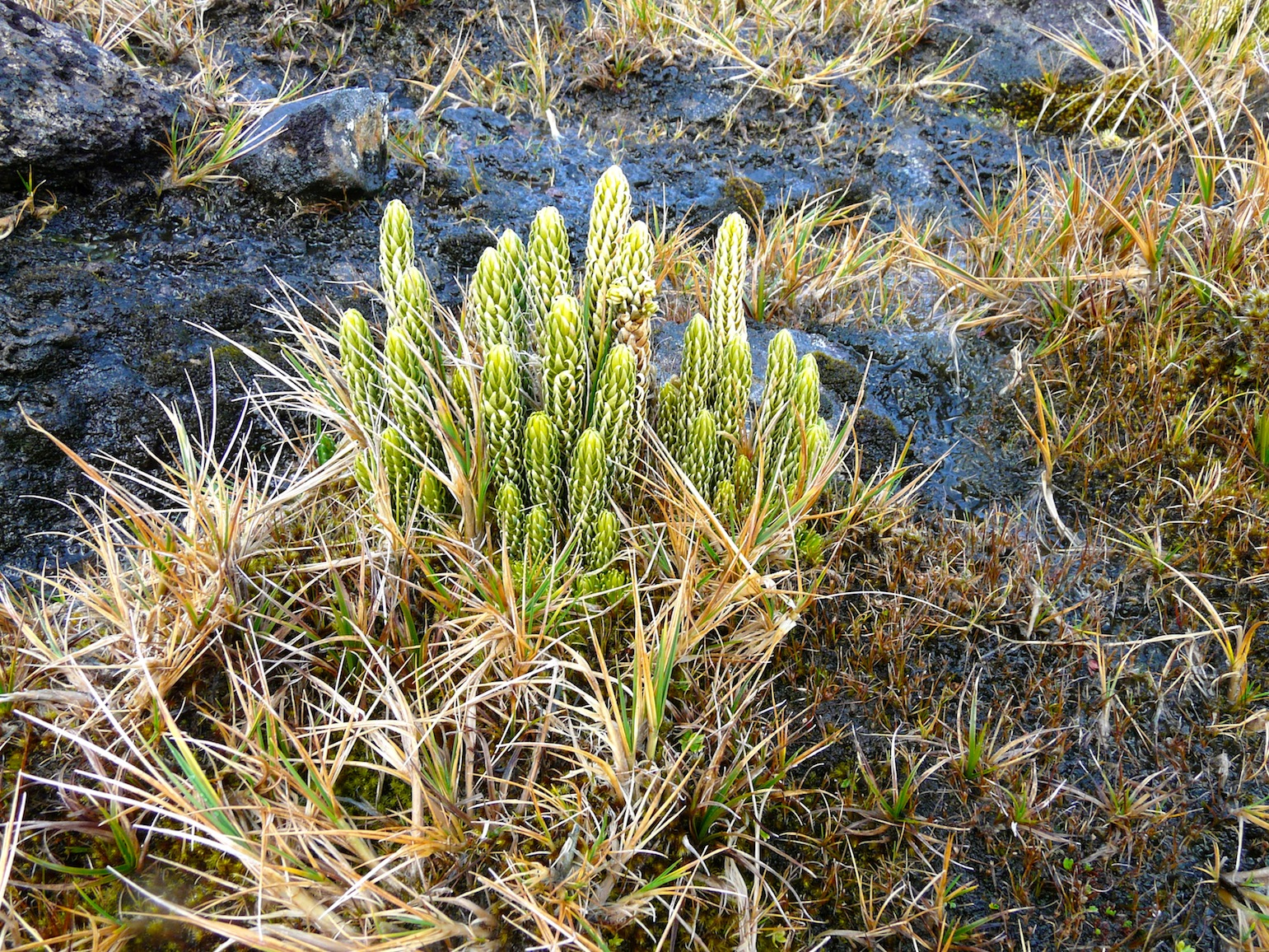
- Austrolycopodium magellanicum

Scientific classification
- Kingdom: Plantae
- Clade: Tracheophytes
- Clade: Lycophytes
- Class: Lycopodiopsida
- Order: Lycopodiales
- Family: Lycopodiaceae
- Subfamily: Lycopodioideae
- Genus: Austrolycopodium; Holub

Species
- See text.

= Austrolycopodium =

Genus of spore-bearing plants

Austrolycopodium is a genus of lycophytes in the family Lycopodiaceae. In the Pteridophyte Phylogeny Group classification of 2016 (PPG I), it is placed in the subfamily Lycopodioideae. Some sources do not recognize the genus, sinking it into Lycopodium. Austrolycopodium species are mostly native to the temperate southern hemisphere.

== Species ==
As of June 2024, the Checklist of Ferns and Lycophytes of the World recognized the following species:

- Austrolycopodium aberdaricum (Chiov.) Holub
- Austrolycopodium alboffii (Rolleri) Holub
- Austrolycopodium confertum (Willd.) Holub
- Austrolycopodium erectum (Phil.) Holub
- Austrolycopodium fastigiatum (R.Br.) Holub
- Austrolycopodium magellanicum (P.Beauv.) Holub
- Austrolycopodium paniculatum (Desv. ex Poir.) Holub
