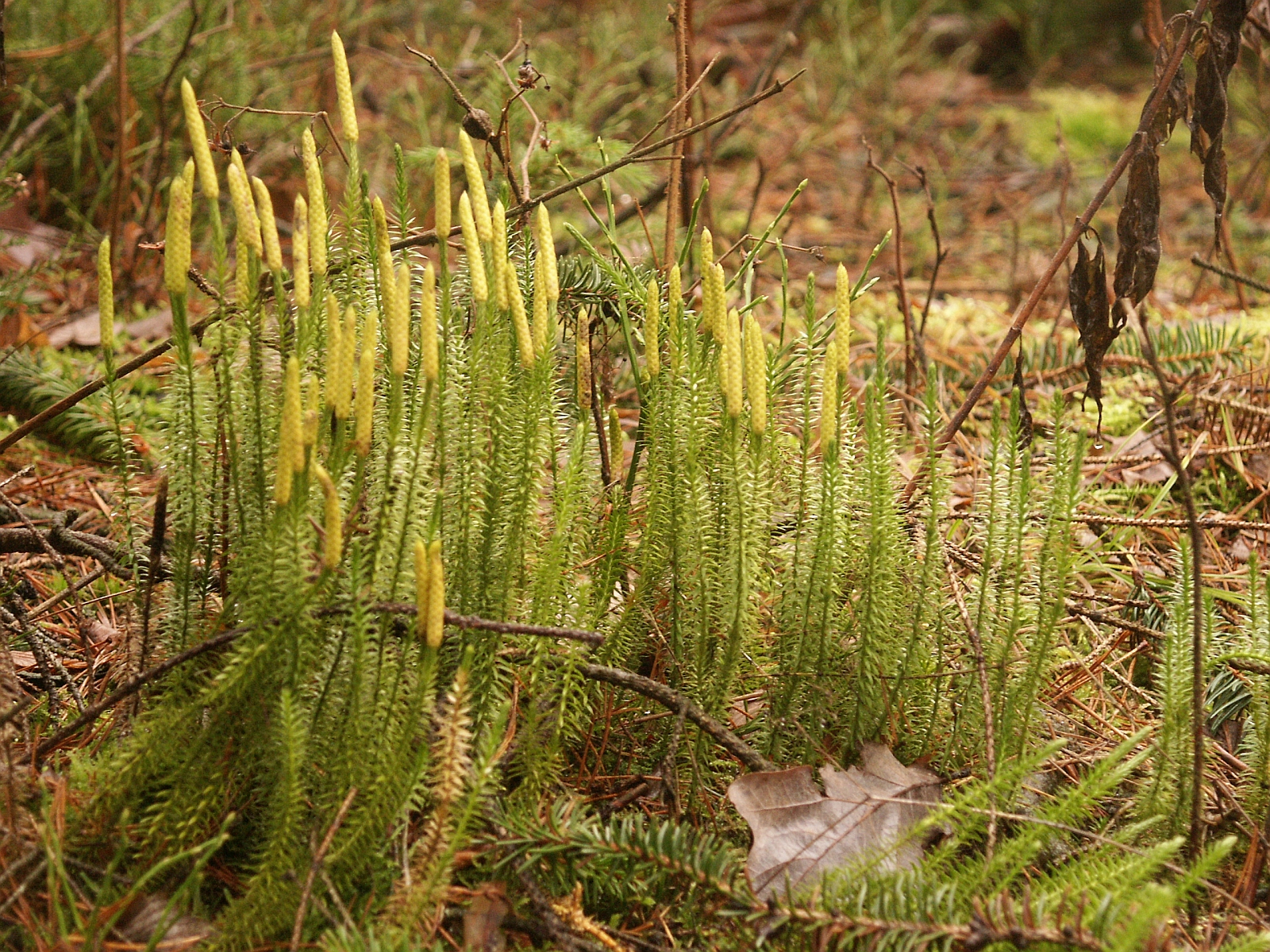

Conservation status
- Secure (NatureServe)

Scientific classification
- Kingdom: Plantae
- Clade: Embryophytes
- Clade: Tracheophytes
- Clade: Lycophytes
- Class: Lycopodiopsida
- Order: Lycopodiales
- Family: Lycopodiaceae
- Genus: Spinulum
- Species: S. annotinum

Binomial name
- Spinulum annotinum (L.) A.Haines

Synonyms
- Lycopodium bryophyllum C.Presl; Lepidotis annotina (L.) P.Beauv.; Lycopodium annotinum (L.)

= Lycopodium annotinum =

Species of plant

Spinulum annotinum, synonym Lycopodium annotinum, known as interrupted club-moss, or stiff clubmoss, is a species of clubmoss native to forests of the colder parts of North America (Greenland, Saint Pierre and Miquelon, all 10 provinces and all 3 territories of Canada, Alaska, and mountains of the contiguous United States), as well as Asia (China, Russia, Japan, Korea, Nepal, Assam), and most of Europe. It is an evergreen perennial pteridophyte. The genus Spinulum is accepted in the Pteridophyte Phylogeny Group classification of 2016 (PPG I), but not in other classifications, which submerge the genus in Lycopodium.

== Description ==
Spinulum annotinum is a common and widespread club-moss spreading by means of horizontal stems running along the surface of the ground. It is usually unbranched or sparingly branched, each branch containing a cone at the top. Leaves have minute teeth on their edges. The branches are 5–25 cm (2–10 in) long, upright and somewhat branchless themselves. The sporangium are located at the top of the branches in individually located spore cones.

== Uses ==
In Finnish traditional medicine Spinulum annotinum has been used as a remedy for rickets. The plant's spore dust has also been used as medicine for rashes and inflammation. The spore dust or lycopodium powder has also been used as 'fly gunpowder' (kärpäsruuti in Finnish) due to the oily and easily flammable nature of the spores.

The plant has been used as decoration in binding crafts in Finland.

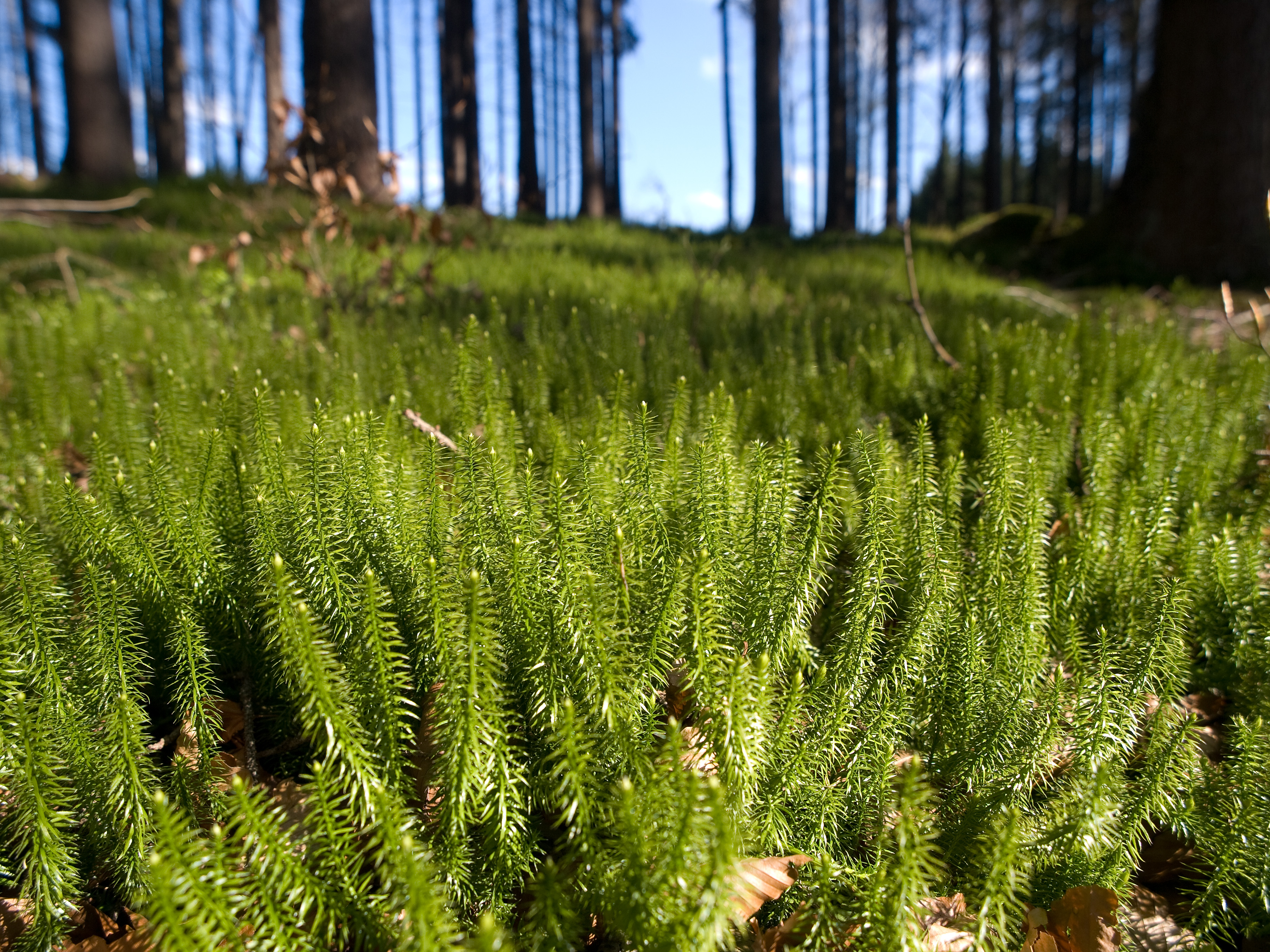
Growing in Germany

== Alkaloids ==
Four alkaloids were found to be present in Lycopodium annotinum. These include: Annofoline, Lycofoline, α-Lofoline and β-Lofoline (fawcettiine).

Lycodine is another example of such an alkaloid.
