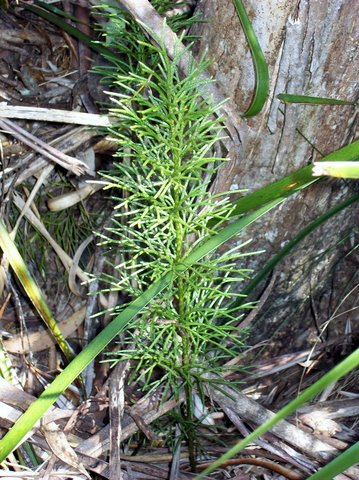
- Growing near the Gloucester River, Barrington Tops, Australia

Scientific classification
- Kingdom: Plantae
- Clade: Tracheophytes
- Clade: Lycophytes
- Class: Lycopodiopsida
- Order: Lycopodiales
- Family: Lycopodiaceae
- Genus: Pseudolycopodium; Holub
- Species: P. densum

Binomial name
- Pseudolycopodium densum (Rothm.) Holub

Synonyms
- Lepidotis densa Rothm.; Lycopodium densum Labill. nom. illeg.; Lycopodium deuterodensum Herter

= Pseudolycopodium =

Genus of spore-bearing plants

Pseudolycopodium is a genus of lycophyte in the family Lycopodiaceae with only one species, Pseudolycopodium densum, known as the bushy clubmoss. In the Pteridophyte Phylogeny Group classification of 2016 (PPG I), the genus is placed in the subfamily Lycopodioideae. Some sources do not recognize the genus, sinking it into Lycopodium. Pseudolycopodium densum is native to Australia, the North Island of New Zealand and New Caledonia. It is a spore-bearing vascular plant and grows up to a metre high. It is found in a wide variety of situations, often in high rainfall areas on sandy soils.

== Taxonomy ==
The species was first described in 1807 by Jacques Labillardière, as Lycopodium densum. However, the name had already been used for a different species, so this name is illegitimate. Hence when Werner Rothmaler in 1944 placed the species in the genus Lepidotis as Lepidotis densa, this was the first legitimate use of the epithet. In 1983, Josef Holub placed the species in a newly described genus Pseudolycopodium. This placement is accepted in the Pteridophyte Phylogeny Group classification of 2016 (PPG I), and by the Checklist of Ferns and Lycophytes of the World as of June 2024. Other sources retain the species in its original genus, Lycopodium, where the legitimate name is Lycopodium deuterodensum Herter.

== Distribution and habitat ==
Pseudolycopodium (as Lycopodium deuterodensum) grows in open forest, scrub or heath in eastern New South Wales, southern Victoria, Tasmania (including the Bass Strait Islands), Queensland, South Australia, the North Island and Chatham Islands of New Zealand and in New Caledonia.
