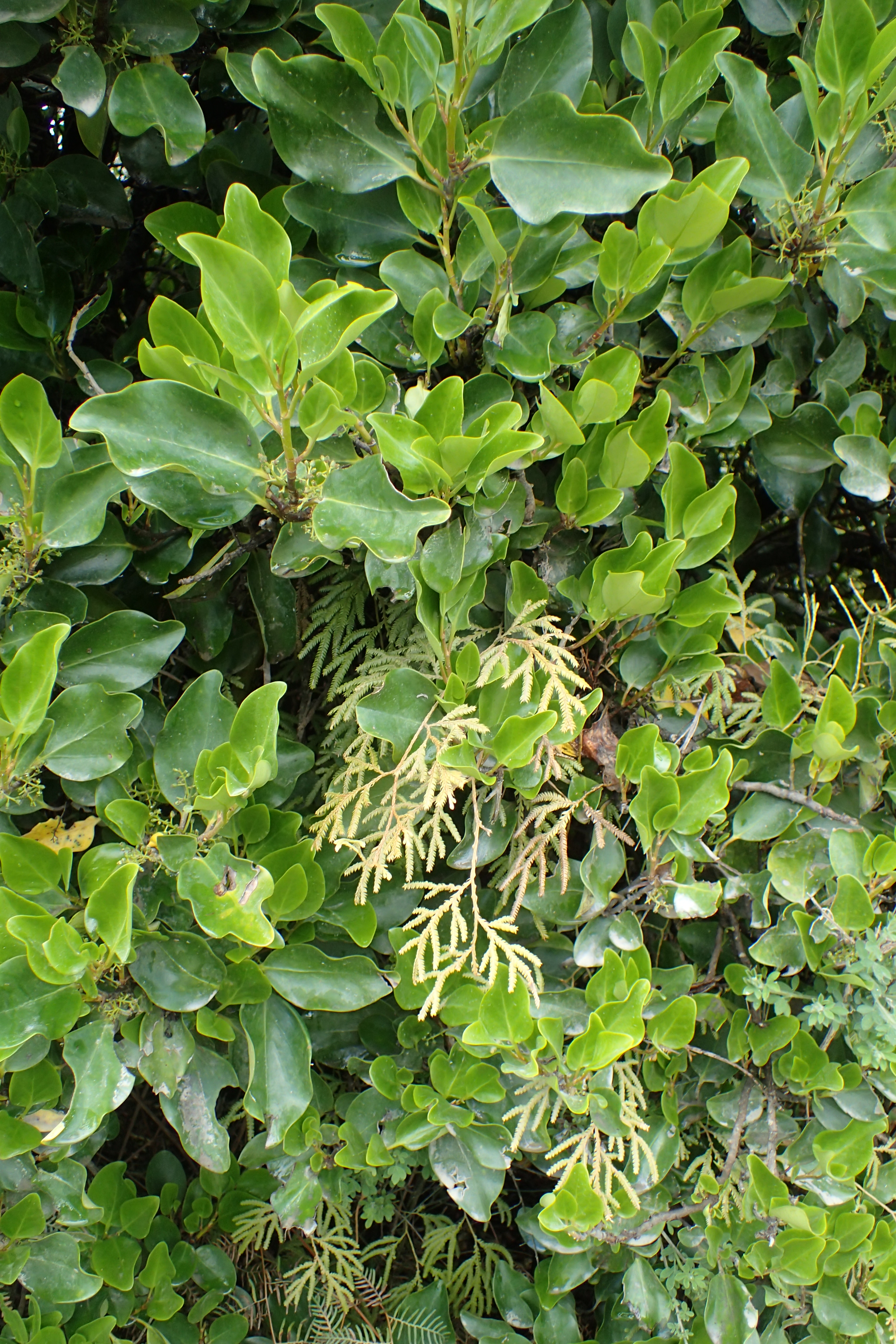

Scientific classification
- Kingdom: Plantae
- Clade: Tracheophytes
- Clade: Lycophytes
- Class: Lycopodiopsida
- Order: Lycopodiales
- Family: Lycopodiaceae
- Genus: Pseudodiphasium; Holub
- Species: P. volubile

Binomial name
- Pseudodiphasium volubile (G.Forst.) Holub

Synonyms
- Lepidotis volubilis (G.Forst.) Rothm.; Lycopodium durvillei A.Rich.; Lycopodium volubile G.Forst.; Lycopodium spectabile Blume

= Pseudodiphasium =

Genus of spore-bearing plants

Pseudodiphasium is a monotypic genus of lycophyte in the family Lycopodiaceae with only one species, Pseudodiphasium volubile. Pseudodiphasium volubile is native from Peninsular Malaysia to Queensland, Australia, and has been introduced into Ecuador. In the Pteridophyte Phylogeny Group classification of 2016 (PPG I), the genus is placed in the subfamily Lycopodioideae. Some sources do not recognize the genus, sinking it into Lycopodium.

== Taxonomy ==
Josef Ludwig Holub formally raised this group to the status of genus as Pseudodiphasium in 1983.

== Extinction ==
In Australia Pseudodiphasium volubile is listed as "extinct" under the Environment Protection and Biodiversity Conservation Act 1999 as Lycopodium volubile and "extinct of the wild" under the Queensland Nature Conservation Act 1992 as Pseudodiphasium volubile.
