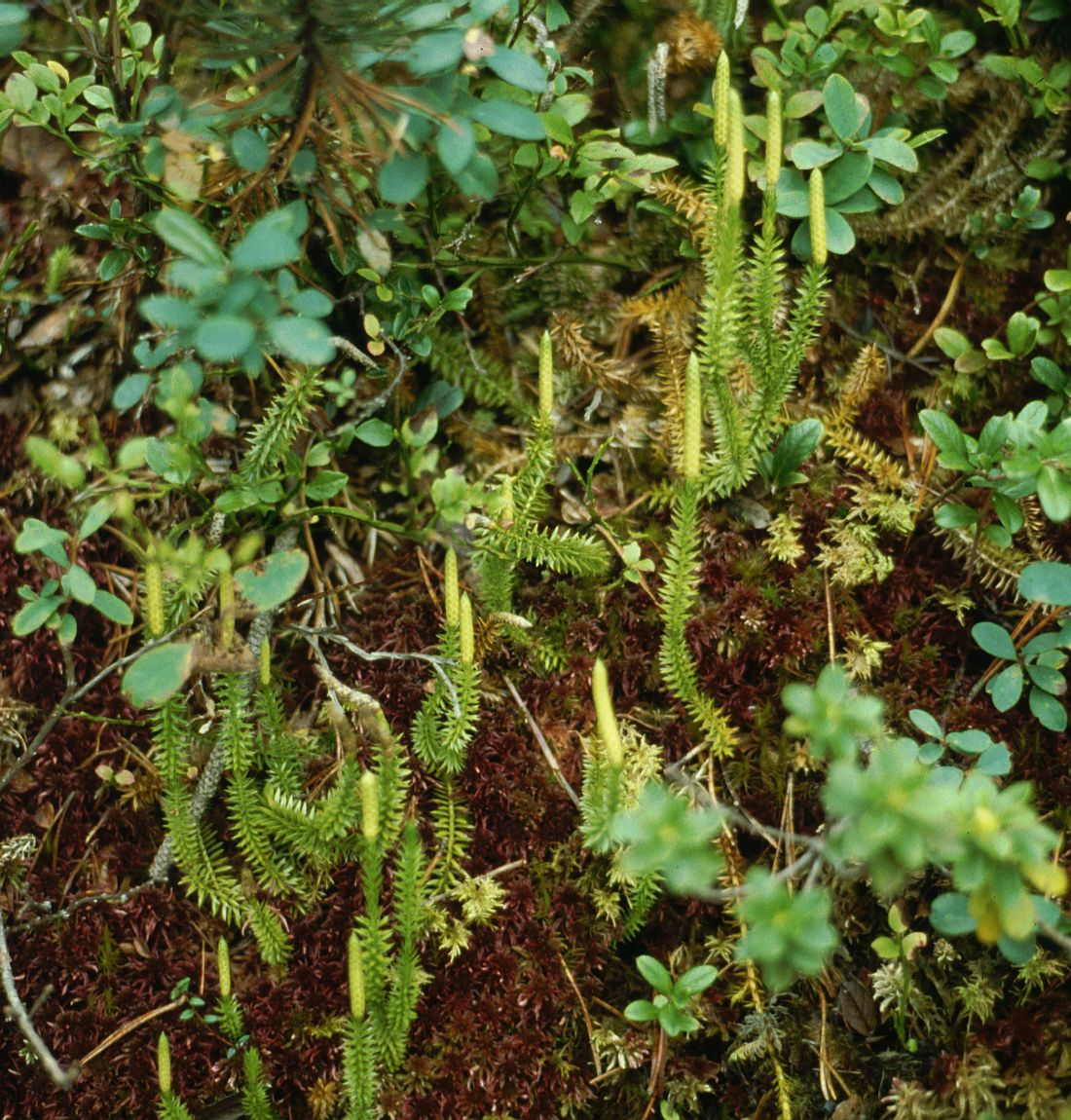
- Spinulum annotinum

Scientific classification
- Kingdom: Plantae
- Clade: Tracheophytes
- Clade: Lycophytes
- Class: Lycopodiopsida
- Order: Lycopodiales
- Family: Lycopodiaceae; P.Beauv. ex Mirb. 1802

Genera
- See text

= Lycopodiaceae =

Lycopodiaceae (Clubmosses)

Family of vascular plants

The Lycopodiaceae (class Lycopodiopsida, order Lycopodiales) are an old family of vascular plants, including all of the core clubmosses and firmosses, comprising 17 accepted genera and about 500 known species. This family originated about 380 million years ago in the early Devonian, though the diversity within the family has been much more recent. "Wolf foot" is another common name for this family due to the resemblance of either the roots or branch tips to a wolf's paw.

== Description ==
Members of Lycopodiaceae are not spermatophytes and so do not produce seeds. Instead they produce spores, which are oily and flammable, and are the most economically important aspects of these plants. The spores are of one size (i.e. the plants are isosporous) and are borne on a specialized structure at the apex of a shoot called a strobilus (plural: strobili), which resembles a tiny battle club, from which the common name derives. Members of the family share the common feature of having a microphyll, which is a "small leaf with a single vein, and not associated with a leaf gap in the central vascular system." In Lycopodiaceae, the microphylls often densely cover the stem in a linear, scale-like, or appressed fashion to the stem, and the leaves are either opposite or spirally arranged. The club mosses commonly grow to be 5–20 cm tall. The gametophytes in most species are non-photosynthetic and myco-heterotrophic, but the subfamily Lycopodielloideae and a few species in the subfamily Huperzioideae have gametophytes with an upper green and photosynthetic part, and a colorless lower part in contact with fungal hyphae. In Lycopodioideae monoplastidic meiosis is common, whereas polyplastidic meiosis is found in Lycopodielloideae and Huperzioideae.

== Taxonomy ==
The family Lycopodiaceae is considered to be basal within the Lycopodiopsida (lycophytes). One hypothesis for the evolutionary relationships involved is shown in the cladogram below.

- Lycopodiopsida
  - Lycopodiaceae
  - - Isoetaceae
    - Selaginellaceae

Within the family, there is support for three subgroups. In 2016, Field et al. proposed that the primary division is between Lycopodielloideae plus Lycopodioideae and the Huperzioideae (names sensu PPG I).

- Lycopodiaceae
  - - Lycopodielloideae (Lycopodiella s.l.)
    - Lycopodioideae (Lycopodium s.l.)
  - Huperzioideae (Huperzia s.l.)

There are about 400 known species in the family Lycopodiaceae. Sources differ in how they group these into genera. Field et al. (2016) say "Most Lycopodiaceae species have been re-classified into different genera several times, leading to uncertainty about their most appropriate generic identification." In the PPG I system, the family has 16 accepted genera, grouped into three subfamilies, Lycopodielloideae, Lycopodioideae and Huperzioideae, based in part on molecular phylogenetic studies. The Huperzioideae differ in producing spores in small lateral structures in the leaf axils, and it has been suggested that they be recognized as a separate family. Other sources use fewer genera; for example, the three genera placed in the subfamily Huperzioideae in PPG I, Huperzia, Phlegmariurus and Phylloglossum, have also all been treated within a broadly defined Huperzia.

The species within this family generally have chromosome counts of n=34. A notable exception are the species in Diphasiastrum, which have counts of n=23.

=== Genera ===
As of June 2024, the Checklist of Ferns and Lycophytes of the World recognized the following genera as members of Lycopodiaceae. All of these are recognized by the Pteridophyte Phylogeny Group classification of 2016 (PPG I), except for the genus Brownseya, described in 2021. Other classifications circumscribe the genera in the family more broadly, recognizing the subfamilies Lycopodielloideae, Lycopodioideae, and Huperzioideae as the genera Lycopodiella, Lycopodium, and Huperzia.

Phylogeny of Lycopodiaceae

- Lycopodiaceae
  - - Huperzioideae Wagner & Beitel ex Øllgaard
      - Huperzia s.s. Bernhardi
      - - Phylloglossum Kunze
        - Phlegmariurus (Herter) Holub
  - - - Lycopodielloideae Wagner & Beitel ex Øllgaard
        - - - Brownseya Zhang et al.
            - Palhinhaea Franco & Vasconcellos
          - Lateristachys Holub
        - - Pseudolycopodiella Holub
          - Lycopodiella Holub
    - - Lycopodiastroideae Zhang & Zhou
        Lycopodiastrum Holub ex Dixit
      - Lycopodioideae Eaton ex Øllgaard
        - - Diphasiastrum Holub
          - - Lycopodium s.s. von Linné
            - Spinulum Haines
        - - - Pseudolycopodium Preslia ex Holub
            - - Pseudodiphasium Holub
              - Austrolycopodium Holub
          - - Dendrolycopodium Haines
            - Diphasium Presl ex Rothmaler

== Distribution and habitat ==
The members of Lycopodiaceae are terrestrial or epiphytic in habit and are most prevalent in tropical mountain and alpine environments. Though Lycopodiaceae are most abundant in these regions, they are cosmopolitan, excluding arid environments.

== Evolution ==
Lycopodiaceae (homosporous lycophytes) split off from the branch leading to Selaginella and Isoetes (heterosporous lycophytes) about ~400 million years ago, during the early Devonian. The two subfamilies Lycopodioideae and Huperzioideae diverged ~350 million years ago, but has evolved so slowly that about 30% of their genes are still in syntenic blocks (remaining in the same arrangement). They have also gone through independent whole genome duplications. In most plants the majority of duplicate genes are lost relatively quickly through diploidization, but in this group both sets of genes tends to be retained with relatively few alterations, even after hundreds of millions of years after the duplication event. Spores indicate that the crown group of Lycopodiaceae had emerged by the Triassic-Jurassic boundary, around 200 million years ago, with a member of the crown group of Lycopodioideae known from the Early Cretaceous of China.

== Uses ==
- The running clubmosses (Diphasiastrum) have long been used as greenery for Christmas decoration.
- The spores have long been used as a flash powder. See Lycopodium powder.
- The spores have been used by violin makers for centuries as a pore filler.
- In Cornwall, club mosses gathered during certain lunar phases were historically used as a remedy for eye disease.
