= List of Canadian plants by genus D =

This is a partial list of the plant species considered native to Canada.

Many of the plants seen in Canada were introduced, either intentionally or accidentally. For these plants, see List of introduced species to Canada.

N indicated native and X indicated exotic. Those plants whose status is unknown are marked with a ?.

Due to Canada's biodiversity, this page is divided.

== Da ==
- Dalea — prairie clovers
  - Dalea purpurea — prairie clover
- Dalibarda — dewdrops
  - Dalibarda repens — dewdrop, false violet, robin-run-away, star violet
- Danthonia — oatgrasses
  - Danthonia compressa — flattened oatgrass, flat-stemmed danthonia
  - Danthonia spicata — poverty oatgrass

== De ==
- Decodon — willowherbs
  - Decodon verticillatus — swamp willowherb, water oleander, water willow, hairy swamp loosestrife
- Dennstaedtia — hay-scented ferns
  - Dennstaedtia punctilobula — eastern hay-scented fern
- Deparia — glade ferns
  - Deparia acrostichoides — silvery glade fern, silvery spleenwort
- Deschampsia — hairgrasses
  - Deschampsia atropurpurea — mountain hairgrass
  - Deschampsia cespitosa subsp. cespitosa — tufted hairgrass, tussock grass
  - Deschampsia flexuosa — wavy hairgrass, crinkled hairgrass
- Descurainia — tansy-mustards
  - Descurainia pinnata — western tansy-mustard, green tansy-mustard, shortfruit tansy-mustard
  - Descurainia richardsonii — Richardson's tansy-mustard
- Desmodium — tick-trefoils
  - Desmodium canadense — Canadian tick-trefoil, showy tick-trefoil
  - Desmodium canescens
  - Desmodium cuspidatum — toothed tick-trefoil
  - Desmodium glutinosum — pointy-leaved tick-trefoil, large tick-trefoil
  - Desmodium illinoense — Illinois tick-trefoil Extirpated
  - Desmodium nudiflorum — bare-stemmed tick-trefoil, naked-flowered tick-trefoil
  - Desmodium paniculatum var. dillenii
  - Desmodium paniculatum var. paniculatum
  - Desmodium rotundifolium — roundleaf tick-trefoil, prostrate tick-trefoil, dollar leaf

== Di ==
- Diarrhena — beak grasses
  - Diarrhena obovata — beak grass
- Dicentra — dicentras
  - Dicentra canadensis — squirrel corn
  - Dicentra cucullaria — Dutchman's-breeches, soldier's cap
- Diervilla — bush honeysuckles
  - Diervilla lonicera — northern bush honeysuckle
- Digitaria — witchgrasses
  - Digitaria cognata — fall witchgrass
- Dioscorea —
  - Dioscorea quaternata — fourleaf wild-yam
- Diphasiastrum — clubmosses
  - Diphasiastrum complanatum — trailing clubmoss, northern ground-cedar, northern running-pine, flat-branched clubmoss, trailing evergreen, Christmas green, ground-pine
  - Diphasiastrum digitatum — fan clubmoss, southern running-pine, southern ground-cedar, fan ground-pine, crowfoot clubmoss, trailing ground-pine
  - Diphasiastrum sabinifolium — ground-fir, savinleaf clubmoss, heath-cypress
  - Diphasiastrum sitchense — Sitka clubmoss, tufted ground-cedar, Alaskan clubmoss
  - Diphasiastrum tristachyum — three-spiked clubmoss, blue ground-cedar, northern ground-pine
- Diplazium — glade ferns
  - Diplazium pycnocarpon — narrowleaf glade fern, narrowleaf spleenwort
- Dirca — leatherwoods
  - Dirca palustris — leatherwoods, ropebark, moosewood, wicopy

== Do ==
- Doellingeria — flattop white aster
  - Doellingeria umbellata var. pubens — hairy flattop white aster
  - Doellingeria umbellata var. umbellata — tall flattop white aster, parasol whitetop

== Dr ==
- Draba — whitlowgrasses
  - Draba alpina — alpine whitlowgrass
  - Draba arabisans — rock whitlowgrass
  - Draba aurea — golden whitlowgrass, golden draba
  - Draba cana — canescent whitlowgrass, hairyfruit whitlowgrass
  - Draba cinerea — ashy whitlowgrass, greyleaf whitlowgrass
  - Draba glabella — smooth whitlowgrass
  - Draba incana — hoary whitlowgrass
  - Draba lactea — milky whitlowgrass
  - Draba nemorosa — woodland whitlowgrass
  - Draba nivalis — snow whitlowgrass, snow draba, yellow arctic whitlowgrass
  - Draba norvegica — Norwegian whitlowgrass
  - Draba reptans — Carolina whitlowgrass
- Dracocephalum — dragonheads
  - Dracocephalum parviflorum — American dragonhead, dragonhead mint
- Drosera — sundews
  - Drosera anglica — English sundew
  - Drosera intermedia — spoonleaf sundew, spatulate-leaf sundew, floating sundew, narrowleaf sundew
  - Drosera linearis — slenderleaf sundew, linear-leaf sundew
  - Drosera rotundifolia — roundleaf sundew, dewplant
- Dryas — mountain avens
  - Dryas drummondii — yellow mountain avens, Drummond's dryad
  - Dryas integrifolia — white mountain avens
- Dryopteris — woodferns
  - Dryopteris carthusiana — spinulose woodfern, spinulose shieldfern, toothed woodfern, narrow Buckler fern
  - Dryopteris clintoniana — Clinton's woodfern
  - Dryopteris cristata — crested woodfern
  - Dryopteris expansa — spreading woodfern, northern Buckler fern, northern woodfern
  - Dryopteris filix-mas — male fern,
  - Dryopteris fragrans — fragrant woodfern
  - Dryopteris goldieana — Goldie's woodfern
  - Dryopteris intermedia — evergreen woodfern
  - Dryopteris marginalis — marginal woodfern, leather woodfern

== Du ==
- Dulichium — threeway sedges
  - Dulichium arundinaceum — threeway sedge
- Dupontia — tundra grasses
  - Dupontia fisheri — Fischer's tundra grass, Fischer's dupontia

== Dy ==
- Dyssodia — dogweeds
  - Dyssodia papposa — fœtid dogweed
