= Chamcook Lake =

Lake in New Brunswick, Canada

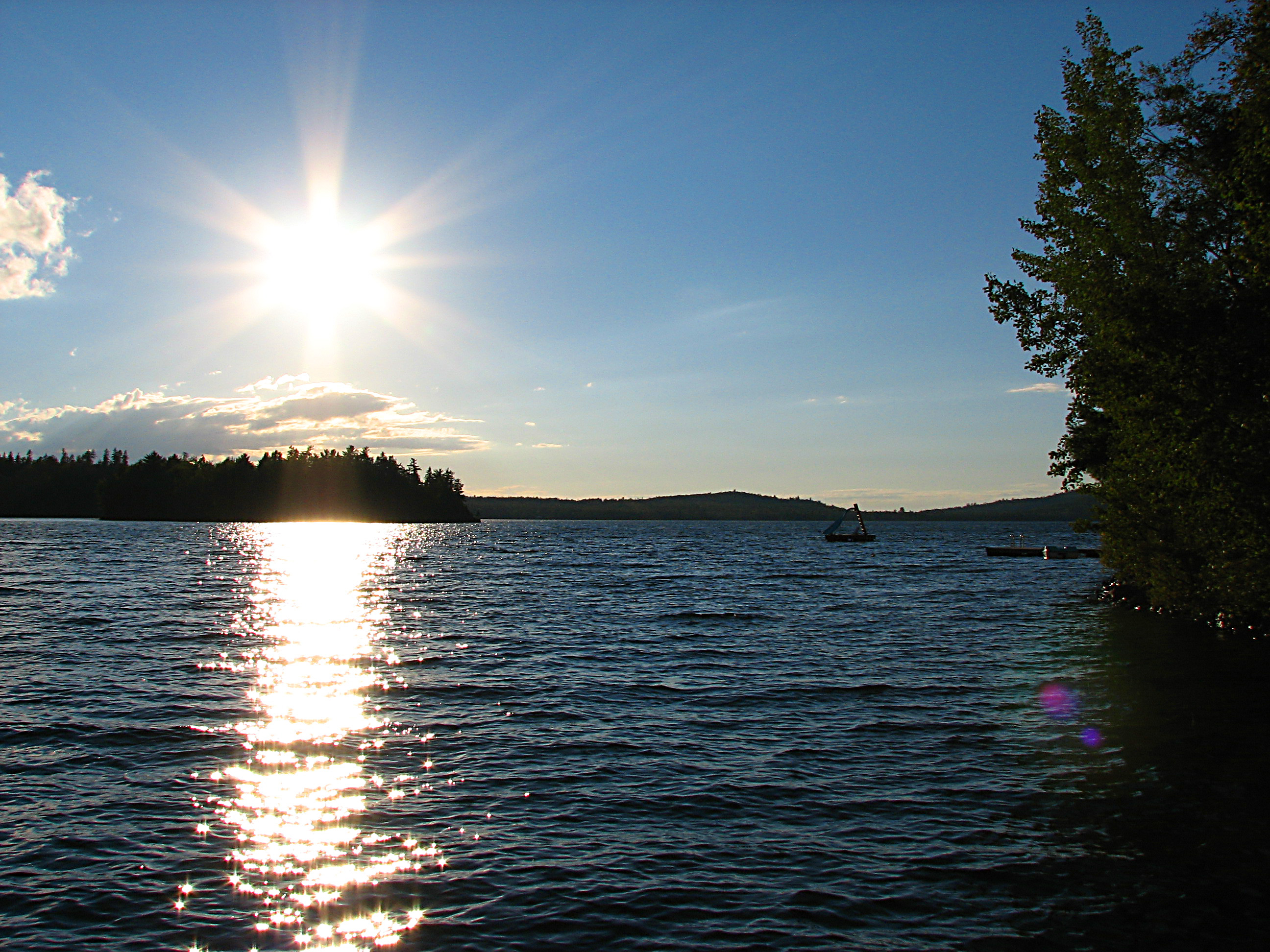

- Location within New Brunswick

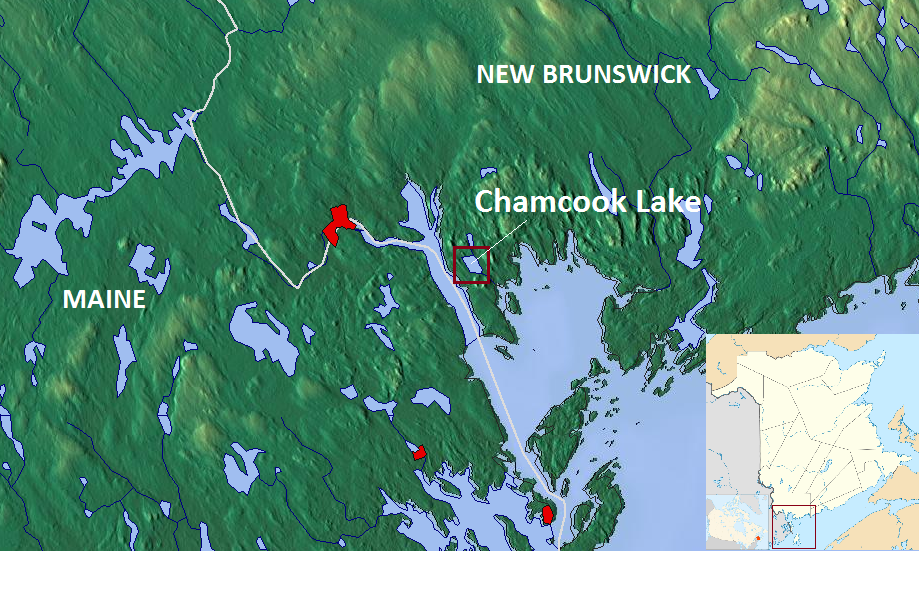
- Location: Saint Andrews Parish, New Brunswick, Canada
- Coordinates: 45°08′41″N 67°05′27″W
- Surface area: 337 ha (830 acres)
- Average depth: 60 ft (18 m)
- Max. depth: 137 ft (42 m)
- Surface elevation: 29 m (95 ft)
- Islands: Odell Island; Big Rock

Chamcook Lake is a lake of Saint Andrews Parish, New Brunswick, Canada. It is located just north of the Passamaquoddy Bay which is part of the Bay of Fundy, near the border with Maine, United States. The town of Chamcook, New Brunswick lies on the eastern bank of the lake and Chamcook Mountain is nearby. The lake has been notable within New England and Canada for its fishing.

It is notable as a local tragedy when five men drowned when their car fell through the frozen lake on January 23, 1938, leading to ballads and poems.

== Etymology ==
Chamcook comes from the Passamaquoddy word K'tchumcook which, according to William Francis Ganong, has many meanings but none are certain.

== Geography ==
Chamcook Lake is approximately 1.5 miles (2.4 km) from Passamaquoddy Bay. The lake is connected by road to St. Stephen, New Brunswick. A Canadian Pacific Railway freight service station has been located at Chamcook Lake.

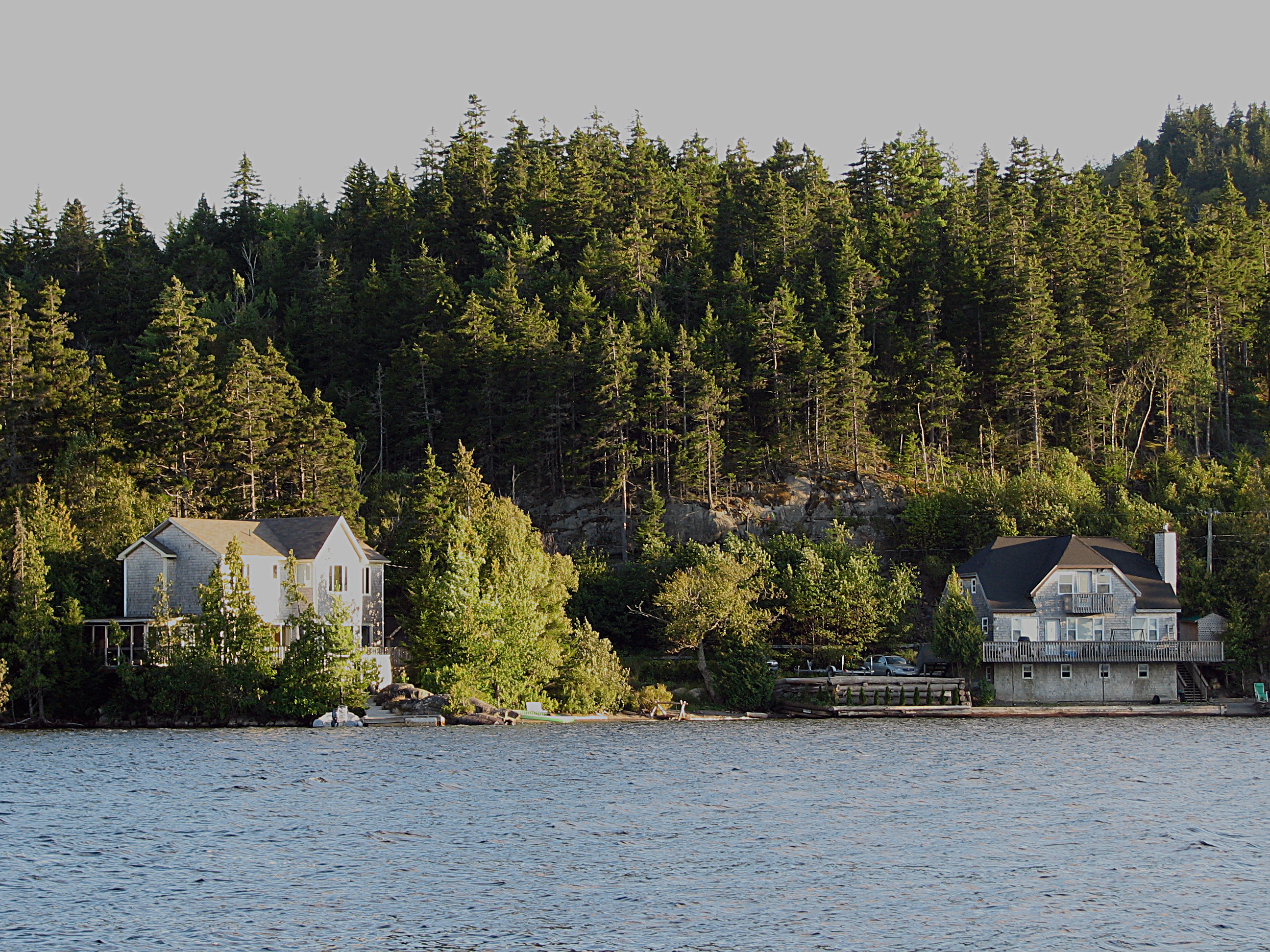
Shoreline

The lake is situated at 95 ft (29 m) above sea level, and has a maximum depth of 200 ft (61 m). The Chamcook River which feeds the Chamcook Lake rises from the cone shaped hill range of Mt. Chamcook. The Chamkcook harbour, a wet dock, lies is to the eastern side of the peninsular where development took place. It contains Odell Island in the southeast and Big Rock in the north. Despite its name, the Odell Island is larger than Big Rock. Approximately 2.2 miles (3.5 km) to the north beyond Big Rock is a sister lake named Little Chamcook Lake. The Chamcook Lake watershed serves as a potable water supply for the Atlantic Salmon Federation, the St. Andrews Biological Station, the Champlain Industrial Park, and the town of St. Andrews.

The lake's red rock is feldspathic, of a brownish-red colour that weathers to brick-red, imperfectly syenitic, and showing some indications of an eruptive origin. A set of very fine petro-siliceous rocks, which are almost black, but have a perceptible purplish tinge are situated on the western shore.

The steep and solitary Chamcook Mountain overlooks the lake. The mountain has a glacial rounded top scored with long scratches which indicate that a glacier from the northern highlands had grated its way across the mountain. The Chamcook Lake and the Chamcook mountain are both located in the Silurian belt of huge sandstones which has fossiliferous and volcanic formations in different sections.

Ecology

After an advisory warning was issued in September 2010 for bloom of blue green algae, no detectable toxins were found in the town's drinking water supply, which comes from the lake, though officials continued to monitor the water supply.

== Flora and Fauna ==
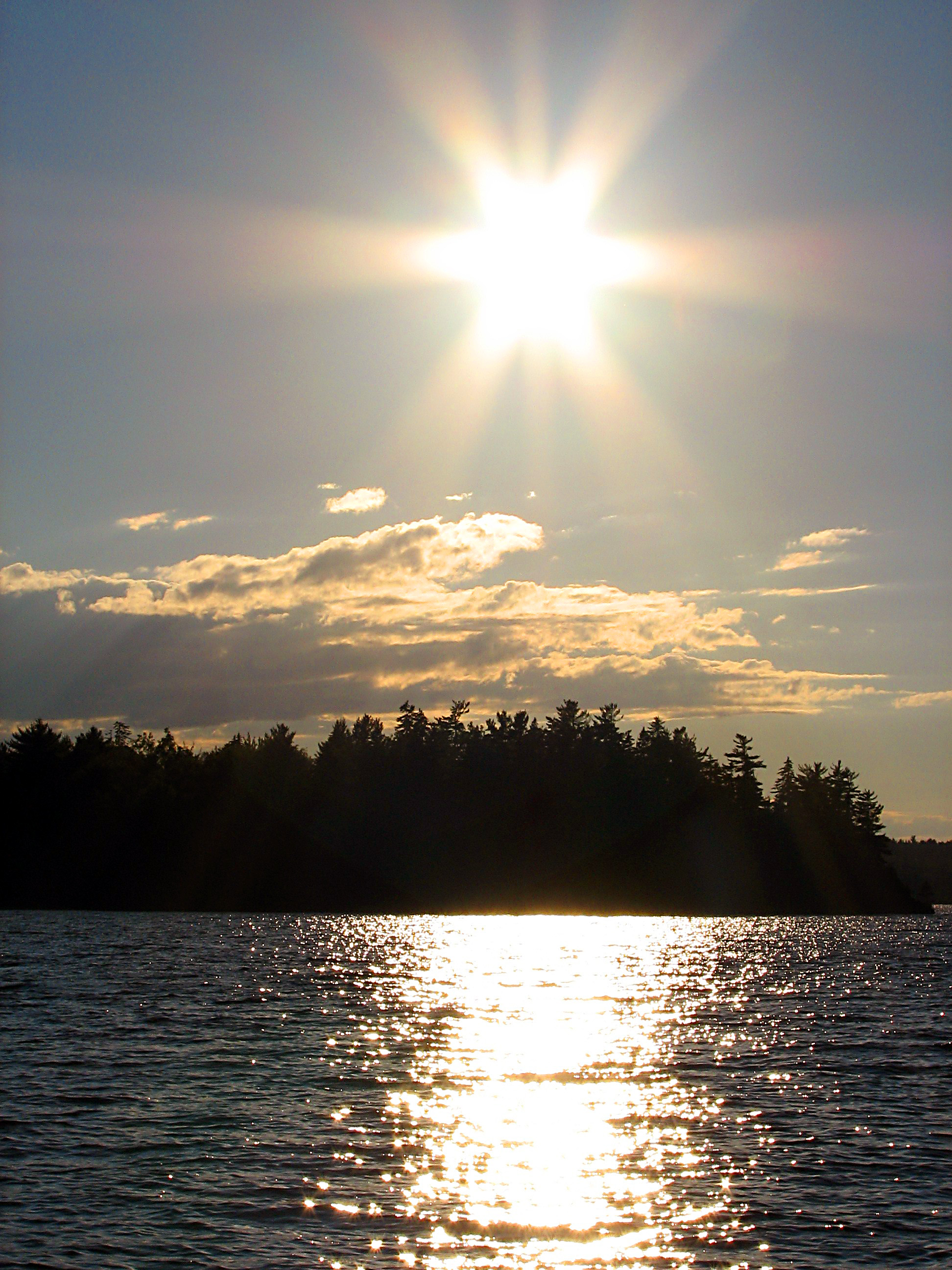
Chamcook Lake

Chamcook Lake contains populations of Vitrea snails and in the 1930s a new species of Holopedium water flea was discovered in the area. Lymnaea stagnalis is found mainly along the lake's margin, composed chiefly of Isoetes echinospora; Sagittaria montevidensis; Potamogeton gramineus; Potamogeton spirillus; and the aquatic form of Hypericum boreale. Ground Cedar is found on the lake's dry bank and Isoetes echinospora is frequent along the lake's south margin.

The mushroom Boletus luridus Schaef. vermiculosus Pk has been found nearby. Of the Halophytes, Sagittaria latifolia, Sagittaria cuneata, Alopecurus aequalis, Glyceria borealis, Eleocharis acicularis, Acorus calamus, and Juncus pelocarpus are noted along the lake margins. The fern vegetation found on the lake's shores and along the stream which flows out from the Chamcook Lake to the sea are Diphasiastrum complanatum, Diphasiastrum digitatum, and Isoetes echinospora.

In 1886, 200,000 salmon and salmon trout fry (young trout) were deposited in the lake. Fish species reported from the lake included sockeye salmon, steelhead trout and brown trout. During certain times of the year, it is said to contain heavy populations of sebago salmon. Studies conducted into the methylmercury concentration of eels from Chamcook Lake in the early 1970s indicated elevated levels of mercury in the lake's ecosystem, although brook trout from the lake revealed only 0.03 ppm.

== See also ==
- List of lakes of New Brunswick
