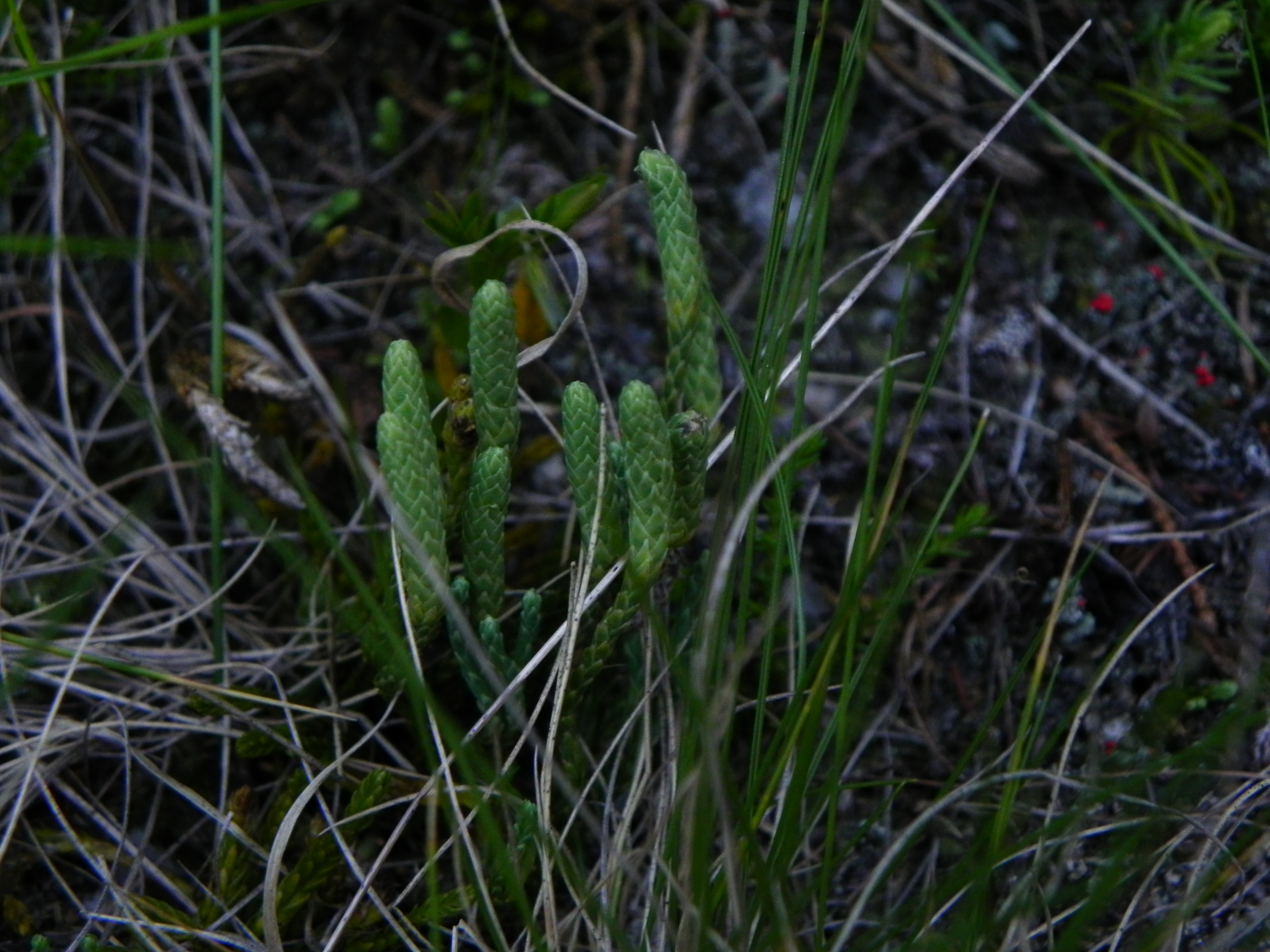

Scientific classification
- Kingdom: Plantae
- Clade: Tracheophytes
- Clade: Lycophytes
- Class: Lycopodiopsida
- Order: Lycopodiales
- Family: Lycopodiaceae
- Genus: Diphasiastrum
- Species: D. × issleri

Binomial name
- Diphasiastrum × issleri (Rouy) Holub

Synonyms
- Diphasiastrum complanatum subsp. complanatum (Rouy) Jermy; Diphasium hastulatum Sipliv.; Diphasium issleri (Rouy) Holub; Lycopodium alpinum race issleri Rouy; Lycopodium alpinum subsp. issleri (Rouy) Chass.; Lycopodium complanatum subsp. issleri (Rouy) Domin; Lycopodium issleri (Rouy) Domin

= Diphasiastrum × issleri =

Species of spore-bearing plant

Diphasiastrum × issleri, known as Issler's clubmoss, is a hybrid species of clubmoss known from northern Europe and a few historical collections in northern Maine.

== Taxonomy ==
Diphasiastrum × issleri is a hybrid between D. alpinum and D. complanatum. Originally placed in a broadly circumscribed Lycopodium as a race of L. alpinum, it was transferred to the segregate genus Diphasiastrum and raised to species level by Holub in 1975. In the past, it has been treated as a subspecies of D. complanatum. American material was once believed to be a hybrid between D. alpinum and D. tristachyum, but the offspring of those parents is properly known as D. × oellgaardii, which has not yet been found in North America.
