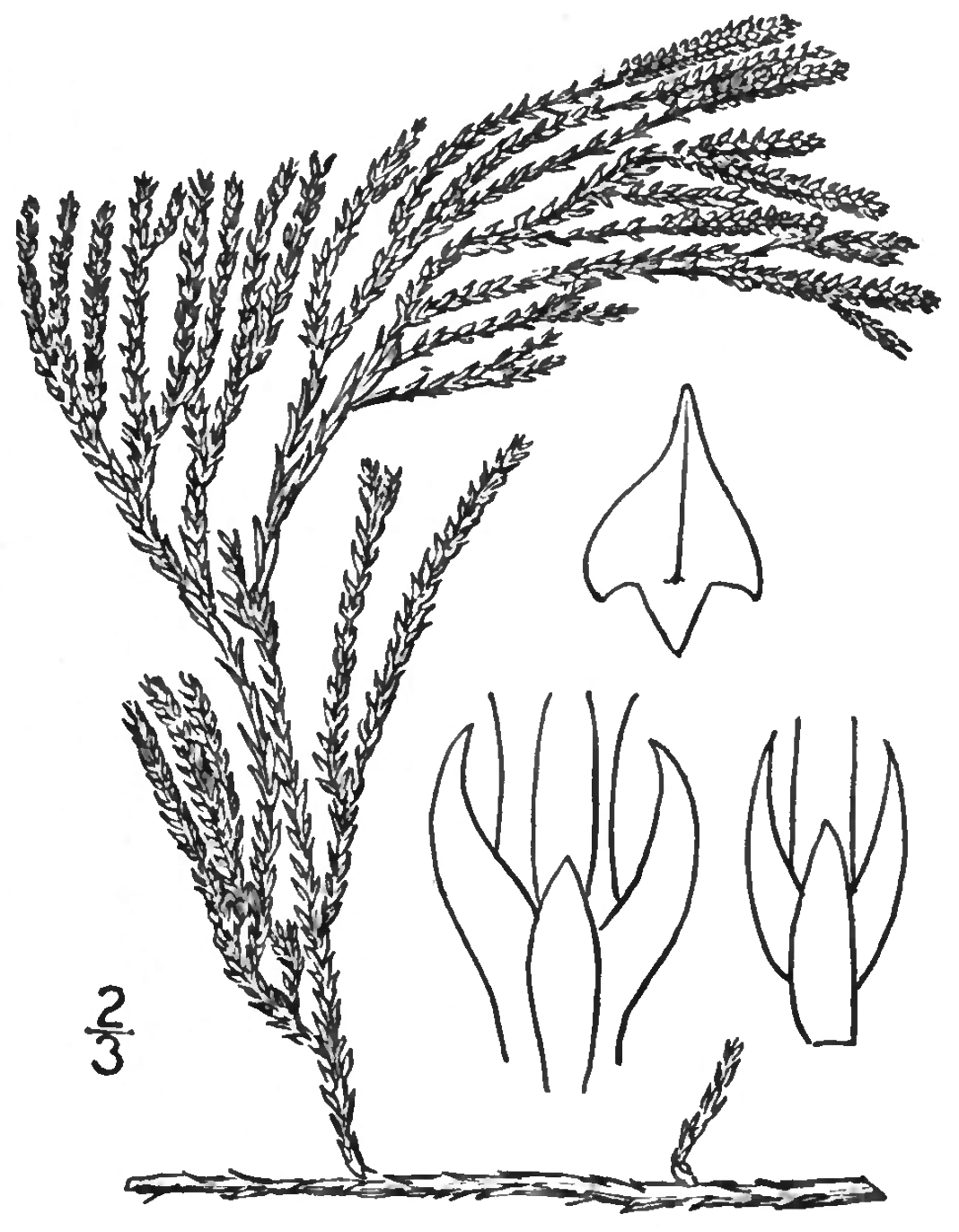
- illustration of Lycopodium sabinaefolium

Scientific classification
- Kingdom: Plantae
- Clade: Tracheophytes
- Clade: Lycophytes
- Class: Lycopodiopsida
- Order: Lycopodiales
- Family: Lycopodiaceae
- Genus: Diphasiastrum
- Species: D. × sabinifolium

Binomial name
- Diphasiastrum × sabinifolium (Willd.) Holub

Synonyms
- Lycopodium sabinifolium Willd.

= Diphasiastrum × sabinifolium =

Species of spore-bearing plant

Diphasiastrum × sabinifolium, the savinleaf groundpine or savin leaf club moss, is hybrid of D. sitchense and D. tristachyum. It can be found in North America from Labrador and Newfoundland to Ontario, and south to Pennsylvania and Michigan. Erect stems can reach 20 centimeters high, and branch dichotomously. The sterile branches are flattened, and the leaves are 4-ranked. Peduncles are 1-8 centimeters long. In many disturbed sites, it can be found growing alongside D. sitchense, and can be distinguished by flattened branchlets split into four ranks, as opposed to those of D. sitchense, which generally are rounded and split into five ranks.
