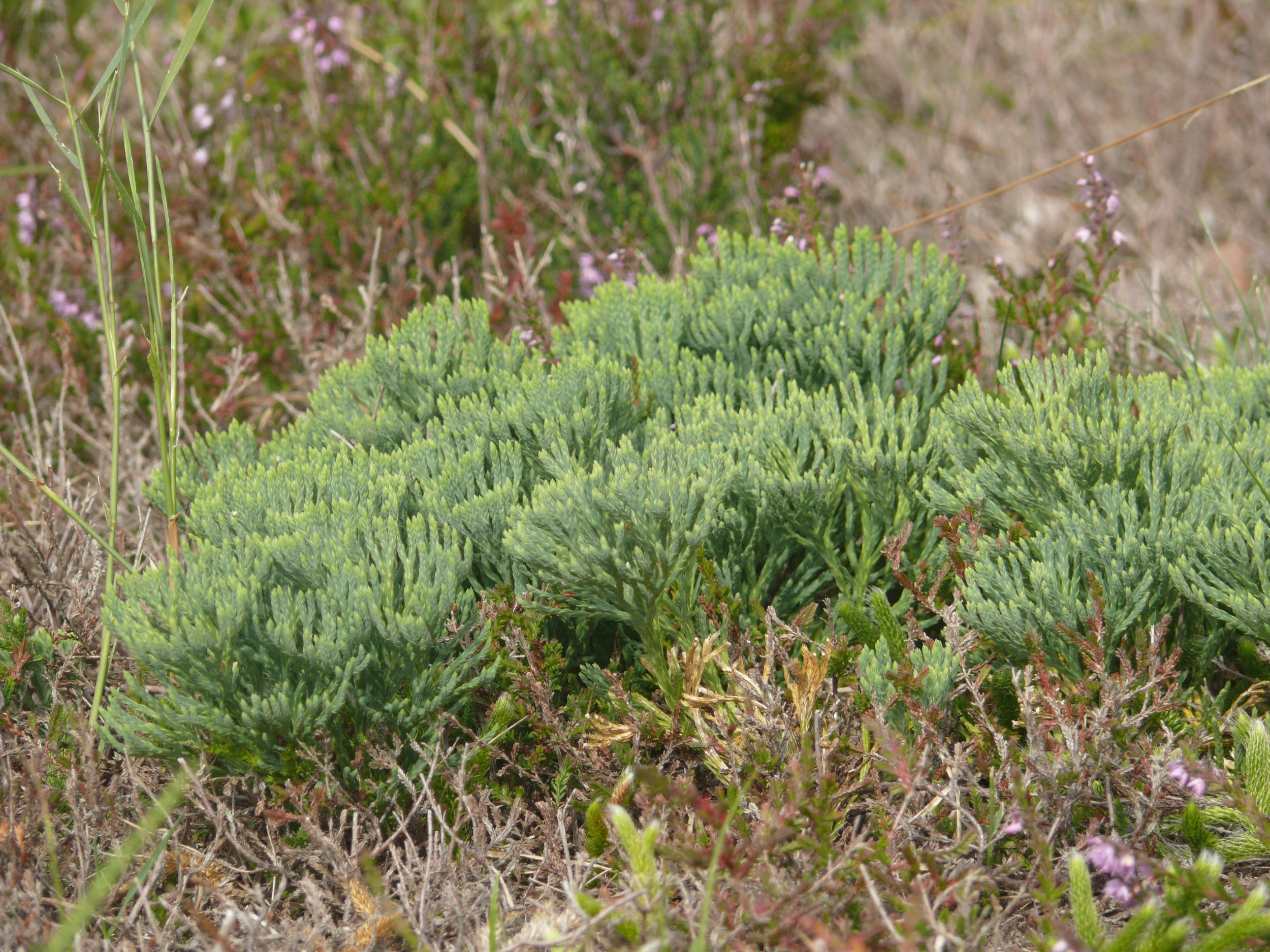
- Blue ground cedar growing in Germany

Scientific classification
- Kingdom: Plantae
- Clade: Tracheophytes
- Clade: Lycophytes
- Class: Lycopodiopsida
- Order: Lycopodiales
- Family: Lycopodiaceae
- Genus: Diphasiastrum
- Species: D. tristachyum

Binomial name
- Diphasiastrum tristachyum (Pursh) Holub 1975

Synonyms
- Synonymy: Lycodpodium tristachyum(Pursh) 1813; Diphasiastrum complanatum ssp. chamaecyparissus (A. Br. ex Mutel) Kukkonen; Diphasium chamaecyparissus (A. Br. ex Mutel) A. & D. Löve; Diphasium complanatum ssp. chamaecyparissus (A. Br. ex Mutel) Dostal; Diphasium complanatum ssp. chamaecyparissus (A. Br. ex Mutel) Kukkonen; Diphasium tristachyum (Pursh) Rothm. 1944; Lycopodium chamaecyparissus A. Br. ex Mutel; Lycopodium complanatum ssp. chamicyparissus (A. Braun) Nyman; Lycopodium complanatum var. chamaecyparissus (A. Br. ex Mutel) Dostal; Lycopodium complanatum ssp. chamaecyparissus (A. Br. ex Mutel) C. Hartm.; Lycopodium complanatum ssp. chamaecyparissus (A. Br. ex Mutel) Milde; Lycopodium complanatum ssp. tristachyum (Pursh) Dostal; Lycopodium complanatum var. chamicyparissus (A. Braun) Doell; Lycopodium complanatum var. patentifolium Spring; Lycopodium complanatum var. tristachyum (Pursh) Domin

= Diphasiastrum tristachyum =

Species of spore-bearing plant

Diphasiastrum tristachyum, commonly known as blue clubmoss, blue ground-cedar, ground pine, deep-rooted running-pine or ground cedar, is a North American and Eurasian species of clubmoss. In North America, it has been found from Newfoundland west to Manitoba, and south as far as Georgia and Alabama. In Eurasia, it ranges from southern Norway and Sweden south to France and Italy and it also occurs in the Caucasus.

The name tristachyum means three branched.

== Description ==
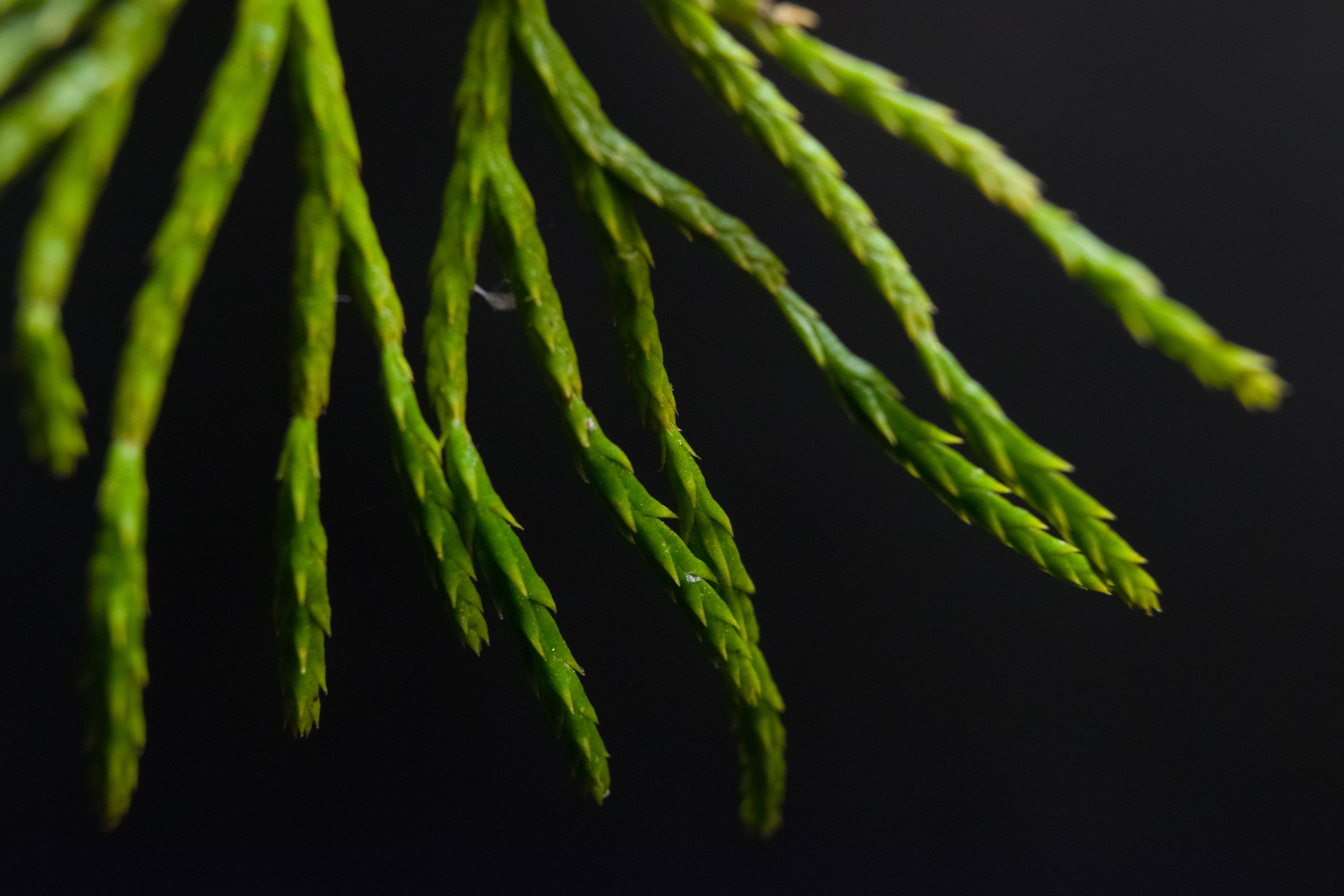
Showing distinctive annual constrictions

Diphasiastrum tristachyum is a perennial species of clubmoss. It grows from creeping underground stems which are often deeply buried at 5–12 cm deep; at nodes from this stem the above ground stems emerge. The upright stems can be 30 cm (12 in) tall or higher. From the main stem, several fan shaped "leaves" emerge, these are not true leaves but rather branched stems which appear to almost look like leaves, each branches 4-6 times. The stems all grow to a similar height at the top of the plant, giving it a flat topped appearance which is a diagnostic character for this species. The peduncle is ~9 cm long and often branches twice near the top to form four strobili; the strobili are ~6 cm long and 3-4mm in diameter with a rounded tip. The strobili contain the sporophyll which are 2.2-3.5 X 1.6-3mm in size, light yellow, deltoid shaped, with a long sharp pointed tip, the edges are rough and chaffy; the spore case is almost round and the spores themselves are convex on their sides.

The branches are 1-2.2mm wide and square with rounded angles when viewed in cross-section. The blue-green leaves are scale like, four-ranked and lanceolate to subulate. It can be distinguished from similar species by annual constrictions along these branches.

Ground cedar prefers dry and sandy areas with poor soils, this allows it to grow in barrens and other xeric sites. It can tolerate sterile acidic soils which are often found within coniferous forests. Ground cedar also prefers to grow in open areas where other plants are not growing densely. Plants growing in the shade are more diffusely branched than those which grow in bright sun, but branchlets are always more rounded than those of either D. complanatum or D. digitatum.

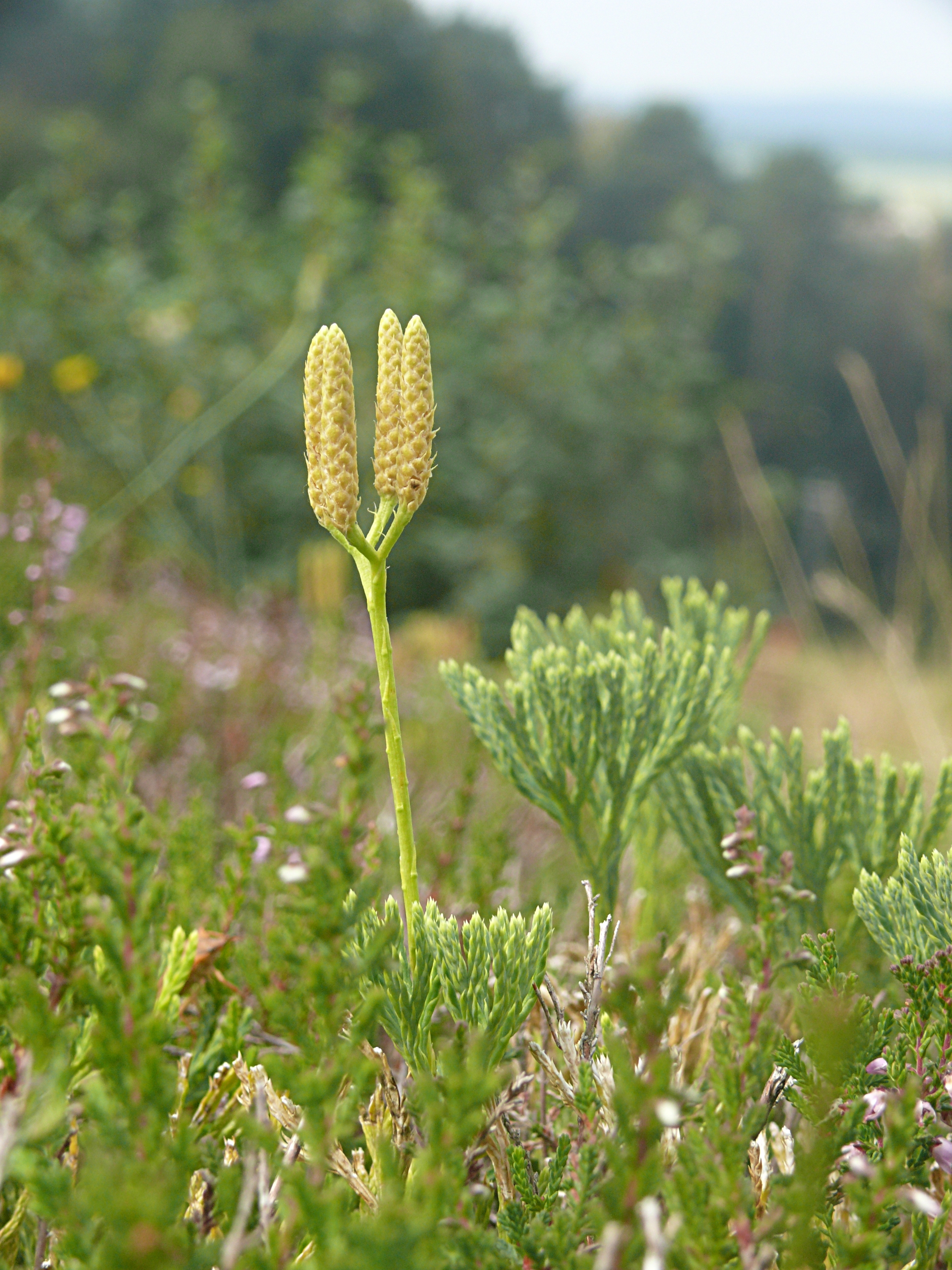
Diphasiastrum tristachyum showing its strobilus

== Hybrids ==
D. tristachyum forms many hybrids with other species in the genus Diphasiastrum

- Diphasiastrum × zeilleri (Rouy) Holub (D. complanatum X tristachyum) is a frequent plant in areas of distributional overlap between the parents, especially in north central and western Minnesota jackpine forests.
- Diphasiastrum × habereri (House) Holub (D. digitatum X tristachyum) has been overlooked and confused with both parents in zones of overlap. It is found occasionally to frequently in habitats like those of the parents, not necessarily growing close to them.
- Diphasiastrum × issleri (Rouy) Holub (D. alpinum X tristachyum) is a rare hybrid in North America, reported only from Maine, but much more widespread in Europe.
- Diphasiastrum × sabinifolium (Willdenow) Holub (D. sitchense X tristachyum) is widespread and frequent in eastern Canada. This hybrid is commonly confused with D . sitchense . It is highly variable, and some individuals approach one or the other parent in morphology (W. J. Cody and D. M. Britton 1989).
