= Creeping cedar =

Creeping cedar may refer to the following plants:

- Juniperus horizontalis in family Cupressaceae
- The genus Diphasiastrum in family Lycopodiaceae
