= Lycopodium powder =

Plant material

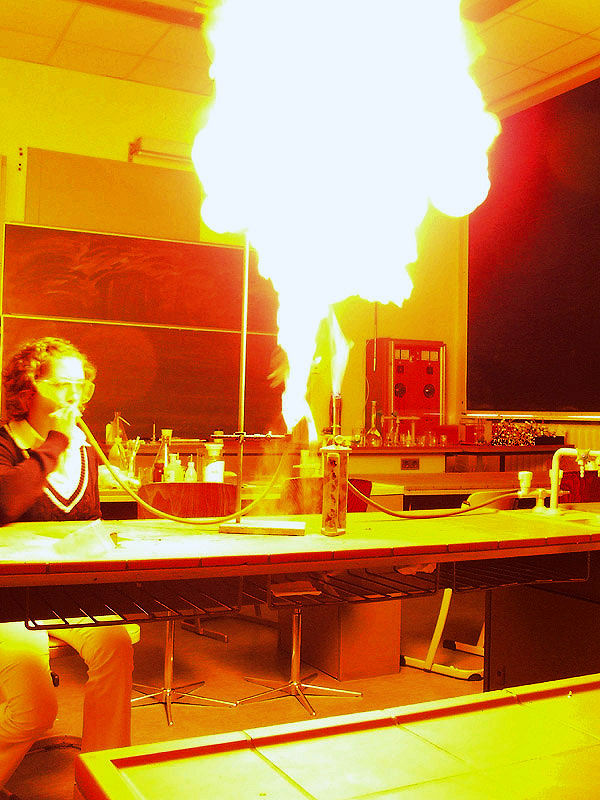
Lycopodium powder being used to demonstrate the power of a dust explosion.

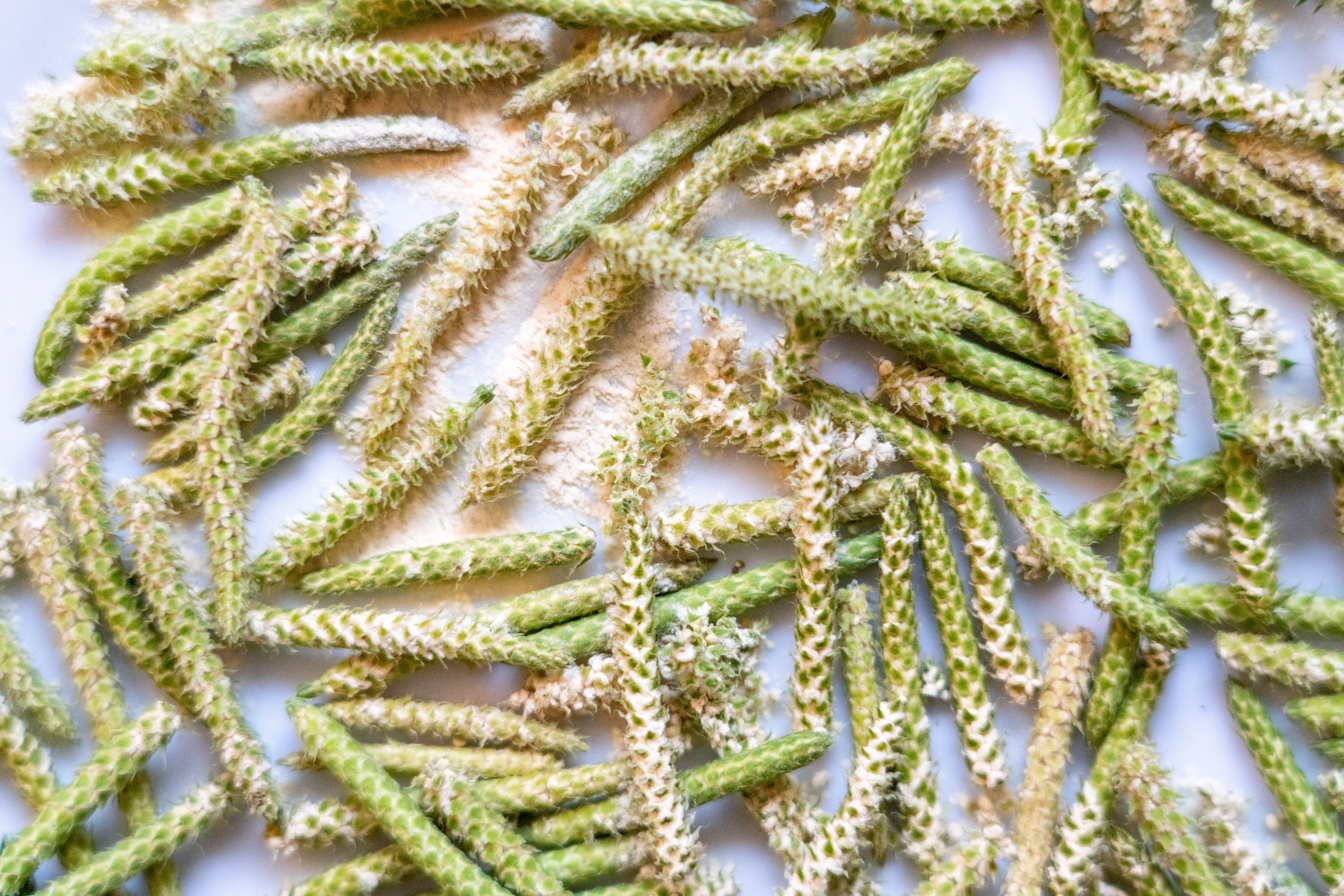
Spore houses from the lycopodium plant drying for harvesting spores.

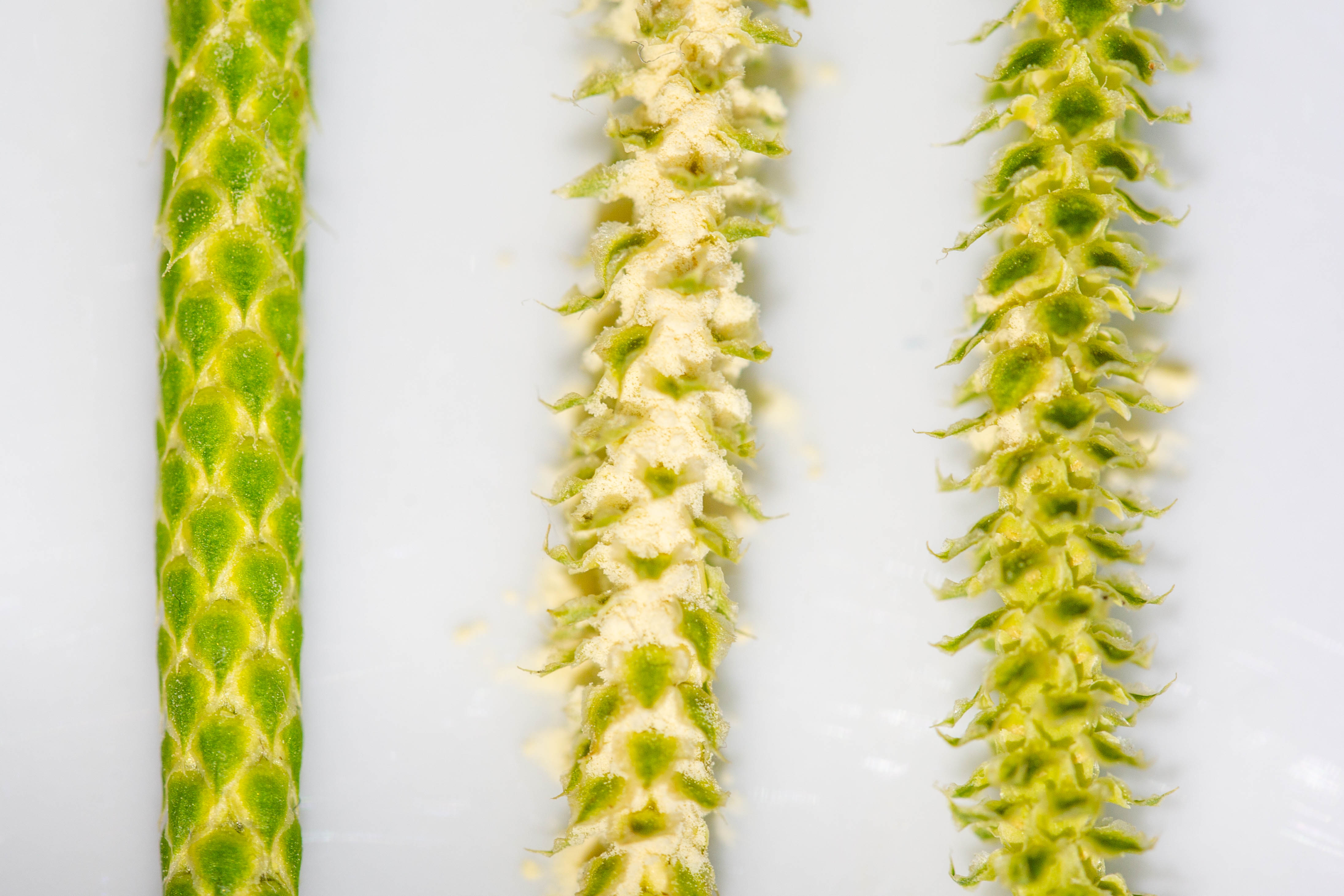
From left: Lycopodium spore house before drying, dried spore house and dried spore house emptied for spores.

Lycopodium powder, also known as vegetable sulphur and formerly witchmeal, is a yellow-tan, dustlike powder consisting of the dry spores of clubmoss plants or various fern relatives. When it is mixed with air, the spores are highly flammable and are used to create dust explosions as theatrical special effects. The powder was traditionally used in physics experiments to demonstrate phenomena such as Brownian motion.

== Composition ==
The powder consists of the dry spores of clubmoss plants, or various fern relatives principally in the genera Lycopodium and Diphasiastrum. The preferred source species are Lycopodium clavatum (stag's horn clubmoss) and Diphasiastrum digitatum (common groundcedar), because these widespread and often locally abundant species are both prolific in their spore production and easy to collect.

== Main uses ==
Today, the principal use of the powder is to create flashes or flames that are large and impressive but relatively easy to manage safely in magic acts and for cinema and theatrical special effects. Historically it was also used as a photographic flash powder. Both these uses rely on the same principle as a dust explosion, as the spores have a large surface area per unit of volume (a single spore's diameter is about 33 micrometers (μm)), and a high fat content.

It is also used in fireworks and explosives, fingerprint powders, as a covering for pills, and as an ice cream stabilizer.

== Other uses ==
Lycopodium powder is also sometimes used as a lubricating dust on skin-contacting latex (natural rubber) goods, such as condoms and medical gloves.

In physics experiments and demonstrations, lycopodium powder can be used to make sound waves in air visible for observation and measurement, and to make a pattern of electrostatic charge visible. The powder is also highly hydrophobic; if the surface of a cup of water is coated with lycopodium powder, a finger or other object inserted straight into the cup will come out dusted with the powder but remain completely dry.

Because of the very small size of its particles, lycopodium powder can be used to demonstrate Brownian motion. A microscope slide, with or without a well, is prepared with a droplet of water, and a fine dusting of lycopodium powder is applied. Then, a cover-glass can be placed over the water and spore sample in order to reduce convection in the water by evaporation. Under several hundred diameters magnification, one will see in the microscope, when well focused upon individual lycopodium particles, that the spore particles "dance" randomly. This is in response to asymmetric collisional forces applied to the macroscopic (but still quite small) powder particle by microscopic water molecules in random thermal motion.

As a then-common laboratory supply, lycopodium powder was often used by inventors developing experimental prototypes. For example, Nicéphore Niépce used lycopodium powder in the fuel for one of the first internal combustion engines, the Pyréolophore, in about 1807, and Chester Carlson used lycopodium powder in 1938 in his early experiments to demonstrate xerography.
