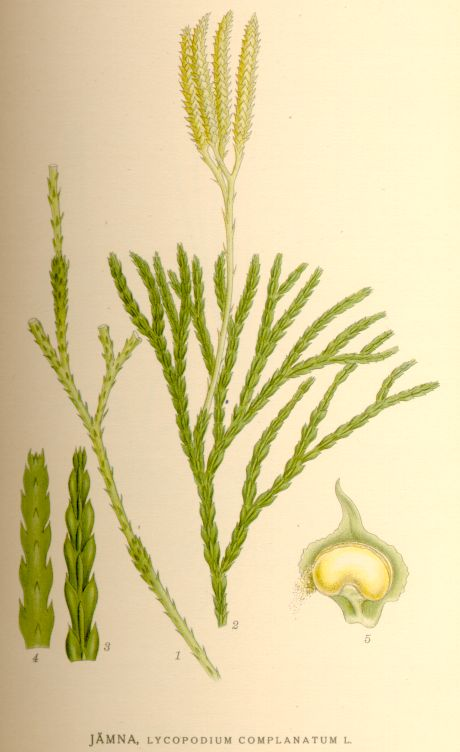
- Diphasiastrum complanatum (previously called Lycopodium complanatum).

Scientific classification
- Kingdom: Plantae
- Clade: Embryophytes
- Clade: Tracheophytes
- Clade: Lycophytes
- Class: Lycopodiopsida
- Order: Lycopodiales
- Family: Lycopodiaceae
- Subfamily: Lycopodioideae
- Genus: Diphasiastrum; Holub

Species
- See text

= Diphasiastrum =

Genus of vascular plants in the clubmoss family Lycopodiaceae

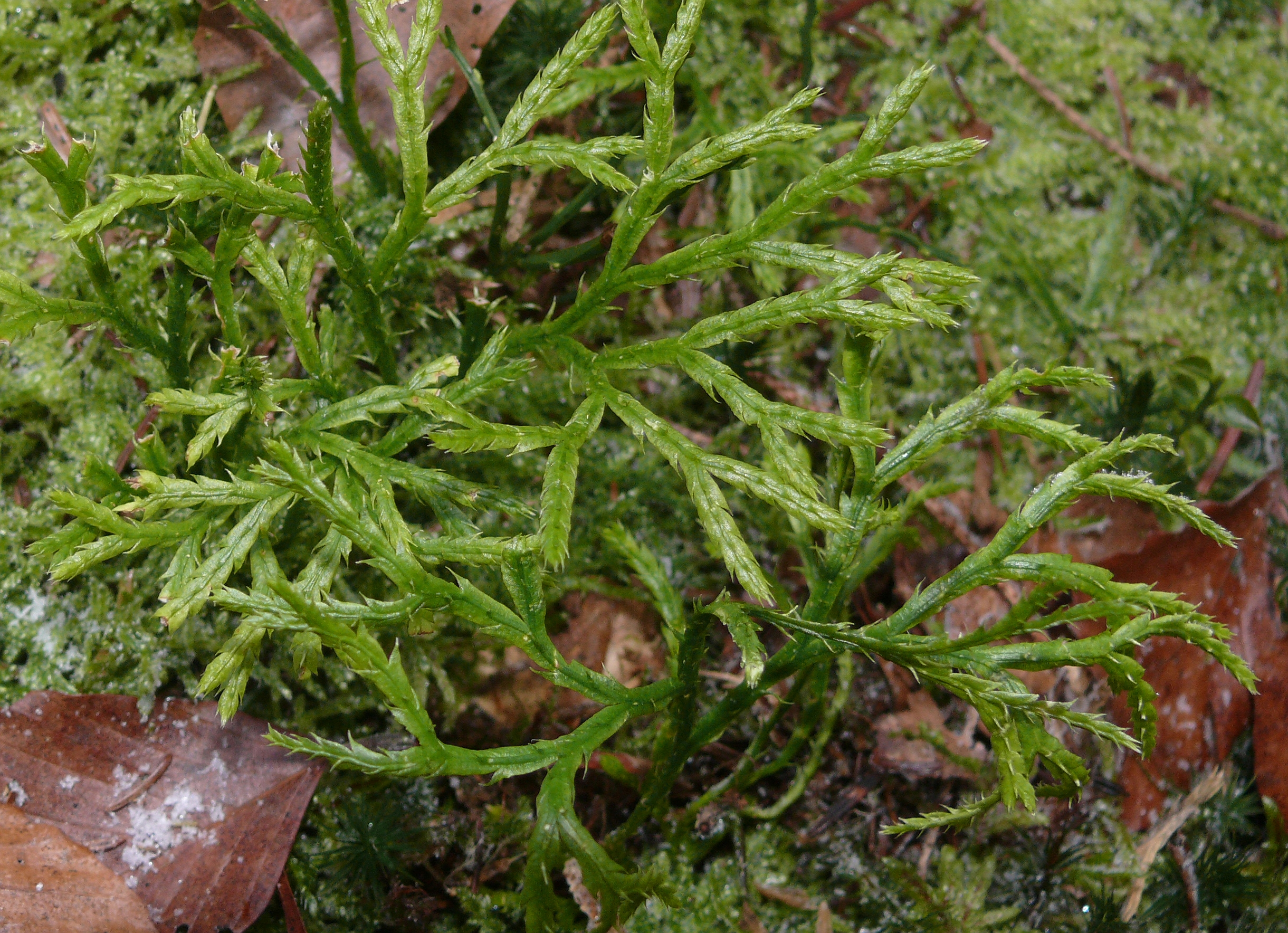
Diphasiastrum complanatum

Diphasiastrum is a genus of clubmosses in the plant family Lycopodiaceae. In the Pteridophyte Phylogeny Group classification of 2016 (PPG I), it is placed in the subfamily Lycopodioideae. It is closely related to the genus Lycopodium, and some botanists treat it within a broad view of that genus as a section, Lycopodium sect. Complanata. Plants of the World Online (POWO), for example, considers Diphasiastrum to be a synonym of the genus Lycopodium. The genus was first proposed by Josef Holub in 1975, who characterized the species by their dorsiventral structure of branchlets, their chromosome number, and their special type of prothallium. Some species superficially resemble diminutive gymnosperms and have been given common names such as ground-pine or ground-cedar.

Features which Holub found to be distinct in most Diphasiastrum species inclulde distinct differences between dorsal and ventral surfaces of leaves, leaves arranged in 3 parallel planes (dorsal, lateral and ventral), leaves coming in 2 or 3 distinct forms, leaves arranged opposite and decussate on the stem, pairs of lateral leaves alternating with pairs consisting of one dorsal and one ventral leaf, complex prothallia, and typically 23 basal chromosomes.

There are 16 species, and numerous natural hybrids in the genus; many of the hybrids are fertile, allowing their occurrence to become frequent, sometimes more so than the parent species. The basal chromosome count for this genus is n=23, which is distinctively different from other lycopods.

Several species have been used economically for their spores, which are harvested as Lycopodium powder.

== Etymology ==
Holub derived the name of the genus from the similar genus Diphasium, to which he added the termination "-astrum," meaning an incomplete or false resemblance. Diphasium, in turn, derives its name from "di-" meaning "two," and "phasis," meaning "appearance" or "phase," referring to the leaf arrangement in two parallel (dorsal and ventral) planes.

== Species ==
As of June 2024, the Checklist of Ferns and Lycophytes of the World recognized the following species:

- Diphasiastrum alpinum (L.) Holub – alpine clubmoss; circumpolar, subarctic and alpine
- Diphasiastrum angustiramosum (Alderw.) Holub – New Guinea
- Diphasiastrum carolinum (Lawalrée) Holub
- Diphasiastrum complanatum (L.) Holub – flat-stemmed clubmoss, northern running-pine, or ground cedar; circumpolar, cool temperate
- Diphasiastrum digitatum (Dill. ex A.Br.) Holub – fan clubmoss, southern running-pine, or running cedar; eastern Canada, northeastern United States, Appalachian Mountains
- Diphasiastrum falcatum B.Øllg. & P.G.Windisch
- Diphasiastrum fawcettii (F.E.Lloyd & Underw.) Holub – Jamaica, Hispaniola
- Diphasiastrum henryanum (E.D.Br. & F.Br.) Holub – Marquesas Islands
- Diphasiastrum madeirense (J.H.Wilce) Holub – Madeira, Azores
- Diphasiastrum multispicatum (J.H.Wilce) Holub – Taiwan, Philippines
- Diphasiastrum nikoense (Franch. & Sav.) Holub – Japan
- Diphasiastrum platyrhizoma (J.H.Wilce) Holub – Borneo, Sumatra
- Diphasiastrum sitchense (Rupr.) Holub – Alaskan clubmoss; northern North America
- Diphasiastrum thyoides (Humb. & Bonpl. ex Willd.) Holub – Caribbean, Central and South America
- Diphasiastrum tristachyum (Pursh) Holub – blue clubmoss, blue ground-cedar; circumpolar, cool temperate
- Diphasiastrum veitchii (Christ) Holub – Veitch's clubmoss; eastern Himalayas east to Taiwan
- Diphasiastrum wightianum (Wall. ex Hook. & Grev.) Holub – southeast Asia, New Guinea
- Diphasiastrum yueshanense (C.M.Kuo) Holub – Taiwan
- Diphasiastrum zanclophyllum (J.H.Wilce) Holub

== Selected hybrids ==
Some species are treated as hybrids, although not by all sources:

- Diphasiastrum × habereri (House) Holub (D. digitatum × D. tristachyum)
- Diphasiastrum × issleri (Rouy) Holub (syn. D. issleri, D. alpinum × D. complanatum)
- Diphasiastrum × oellgaardii Stoor, Boudrie, Jérôme, K.Horn & Bennert (D. alpinum × D. tristachyum)
- Diphasiastrum × sabinifolium (Willd.) Holub (syn. D. sabinifolium, D. sitchense × D. tristachyum)
- Diphasiastrum × takedae Ivanenko (D. alpinum × D. sitchense)
- Diphasiastrum × verecundum A.V.Gilman (D. complanatum × D. digitatum)
- Diphasiastrum × zeilleri (Rouy) Holub (D. complanatum × D. tristachyum)

== Distribution ==
The genus has a subcosmopolitan distribution, in much of the Northern Hemisphere, south in mountains to South America (reaching furthest south in Jujuy Province, northwest Argentina), New Guinea and the Marquesas Islands in the Pacific Ocean, but confined to climates with high humidity for most or all of the year (or, in cool climates, protected by snow cover in winter).
