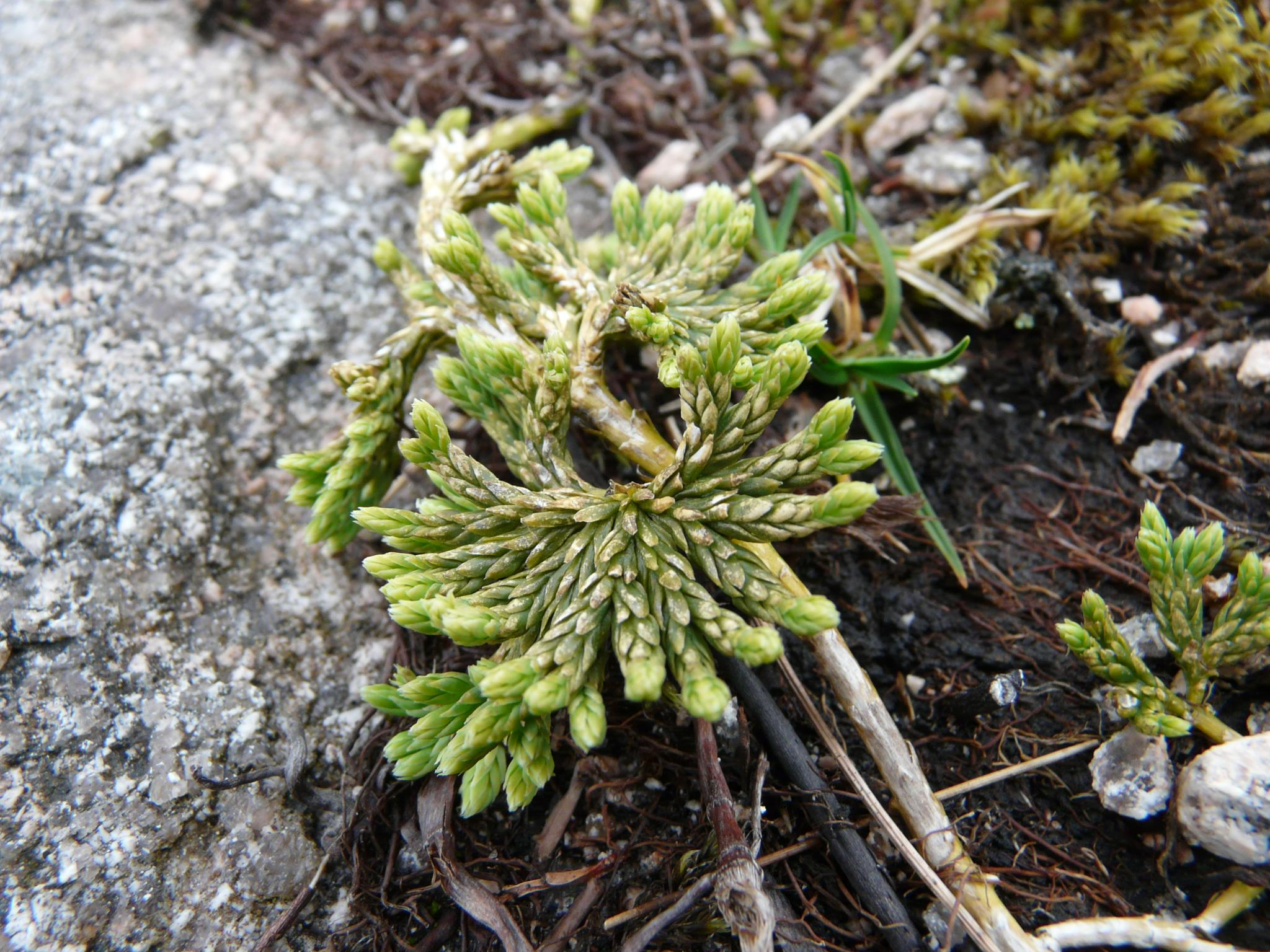

Conservation status
- Secure (NatureServe)

Scientific classification
- Kingdom: Plantae
- Clade: Tracheophytes
- Clade: Lycophytes
- Class: Lycopodiopsida
- Order: Lycopodiales
- Family: Lycopodiaceae
- Genus: Diphasiastrum
- Species: D. alpinum

Binomial name
- Diphasiastrum alpinum (L.) Holub 1975

Synonyms
- Synonymy: Diphasium alpinum (L.) Rothm.; Lepidotis alpina (L.) P. Beauv.; Stachygynandrum alpinum (L.) C. Presl; Lycopodium alpinum L. 1753; Diphasium alpinum (L.) Rothm.; Lycopodium chamarense Turcz. ex Ledeb.; Lycopodium cupressifolium Opiz; Diphasiastrum kablikianum (Domin) Dostál

= Diphasiastrum alpinum =

Species of spore-bearing plant

Diphasiastrum alpinum, the alpine clubmoss, is a species of clubmoss. This plant is a glaucous scale-leaved perennial pteridophyte. In Finland, the spores are produced June to September. It was first described by Carl Linnaeus in his Flora Lapponica, 1737, from specimens obtained in Finland.

== Description ==
Diphasiastrum alpinum have 30-50 cm long stems, with 3-5 cm long branches. The stems are upright, 4-edged, growing densely in branchy bunches. The leaves are small, scale-like, wintering and parallel to the stem. The leaves are hollow at the bases. The spore-cases are in sessile, 1-1,5 cm long, densely cylindrical spore cones. The female stems produce strobili up to 3 cm (1 in) long.

Diphasiastrum alpinum may hybridize with Diphasiastrum sitchense.

== Distribution ==
It has a circumpolar distribution across much of the northern parts of the Northern Hemisphere: much of Canada, the northwestern United States, northern and central Europe, Russia, China and Japan. It is an indicator of alpine tundra and boreal climates. It is found in mountains and moors often with Calluna and grasses.
