= Bayside, New Brunswick =

Place in New Brunswick, Canada

Coordinates: 45.128°N 67.105028°W

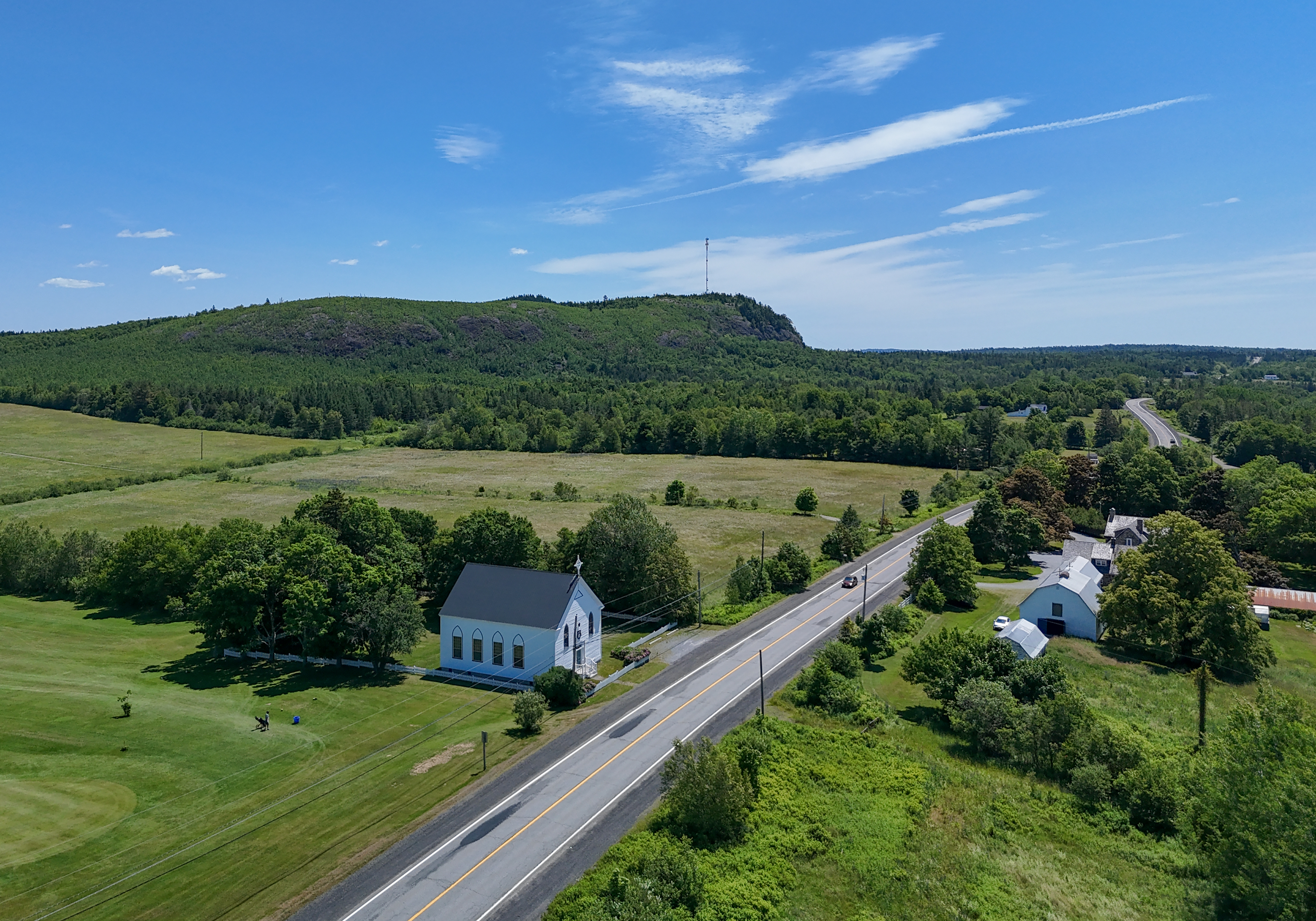
Bayside, New Brunswick

Location of Bayside in New Brunswick

Bayside is a designated place and dispersed rural community in Charlotte County, New Brunswick, Canada. Historically part of Saint Croix Parish, it became part of the Town of Saint Andrews on 1 January 2023 under New Brunswick’s local governance reforms. It is located on the north bank of the Saint Croix River, approximately 2.27 km northwest of Wileys Corner. The community lies primarily along New Brunswick Route 127.

== History ==
In 1866, Bayside was a farming settlement consisting of approximately 15 families. By 1871, the community and its surrounding district had a population of about 300. By 1904, Bayside supported a post office, a church, and a creamery, with a population of around 200. A post office operated in the community from 1854 to 1913. The area historically included Lower Bayside.

== Demographics ==
In the 2021 Census of Population conducted by Statistics Canada, Bayside had a population of 355 living in 158 of its 213 total private dwellings, representing a 2.3% change from its 2016 population of 347. With a land area of 33.99 km^{2} (13.12 sq mi), it had a population density of 10.4/km^{2} (27.1/sq mi) in 2021.

== See also ==
- List of communities in New Brunswick
