= Chamcook, New Brunswick =

Unincorporated area in New Brunswick, Canada

Coordinates: 45.126389°N 67.071667°W

Location of Chamcook in New Brunswick

Chamcook (/ʃæmˈkʊk/ sham-KUUK) is an unincorporated area in Charlotte County, New Brunswick, Canada. It lies between the eastern shore of Chamcook Lake and the western edge of Passamaquoddy Bay.

Local governance was provided by the Chamcook Local Service District (LSD) prior to the 2023 local governance reforms. The LSD was responsible for assessing and providing services such as fire protection, police, zoning, emergency measures, and animal control. Its taxing authority number was 513.00 Chamcook. The LSD was part of the Southwest New Brunswick Service Commission (SNBSC).

Statistics Canada includes Chamcook's population in the census subdivision of Saint Andrews Parish.

The origin of the name "Chamcook" is uncertain. As noted by William Francis Ganong, “Many meanings have been given, but none are certain.” It may refer to a harbour with a narrow entrance. Ganong recorded the Passamaquoddy name for the area as K'tchum'cook or Shamcook.

== History ==
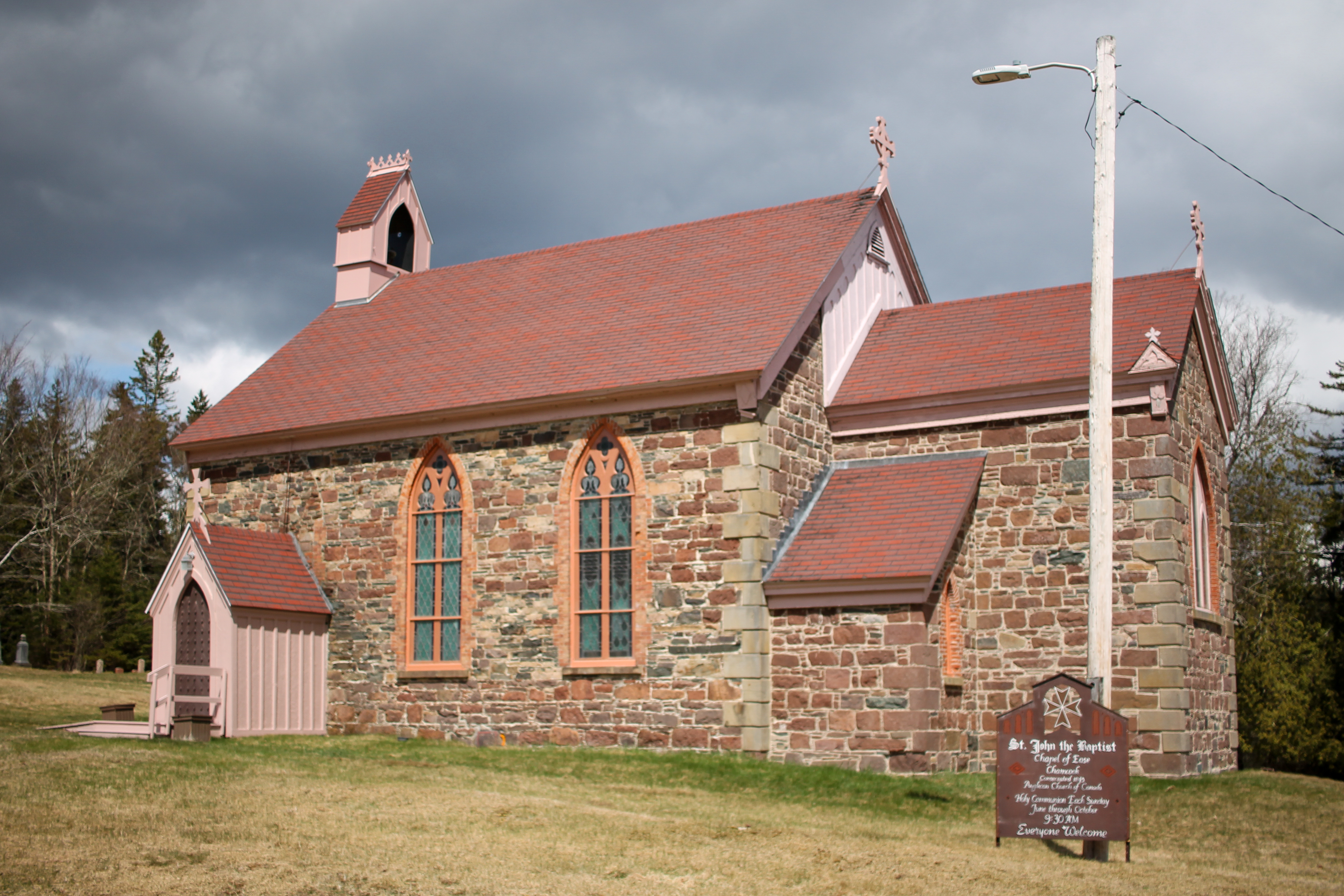
St. John the Baptist Chapel of Ease in Chamcook, New Brunswick

Chamcook was first settled in 1785. Its location on Passamaquoddy Bay supported fishing and shipbuilding as key local industries, while agriculture also played an important role, as in many surrounding New Brunswick communities.

By 1866, Chamcook was a fishing, farming, and shipbuilding settlement with approximately 90 families. It became a flag station on the New Brunswick and Canada Railway in 1871, with a population of about 150. By 1904, it was a station on the Canadian Pacific Railway, and the community included a post office, a summer hotel, a flour and feed mill, a church, and a population of around 300.

== Religion ==
Chamcook is home to St. John the Baptist Anglican Chapel, which functions as a chapel of ease for the Parish of Saint Andrews. The parish, founded in 1873, encompasses the Town of Saint Andrews and the surrounding peninsula extending into Passamaquoddy Bay. The main parish church is All Saints in Saint Andrews; St. John the Baptist serves as a secondary worship site for parishioners in Chamcook.

== See also ==
- List of communities in New Brunswick
- List of people from Charlotte County, New Brunswick
