= Diphasiastrum multispicatum =

Scientific classification
- Kingdom: Plantae
- Clade: Tracheophytes
- Clade: Lycophytes
- Class: Lycopodiopsida
- Order: Lycopodiales
- Family: Lycopodiaceae
- Genus: Diphasiastrum
- Species: D. multispicatum

Binomial name
- Diphasiastrum multispicatum (J.H.Wilce) Holub

Synonyms
- Diphasiastrum complanatum var. glaucum Ching; Diphasium multispicatum (J.H.Wilce) Rothm.; Lycopodium multispicatum J.H.Wilce

Species of plant

Diphasiastrum multispicatum, synonym Lycopodium multispicatum, is a species of plant in the family Lycopodiaceae. As of March 2024, Plants of the World Online used a broader circumscription of the genus Lycopodium, treating this species as Lycopodium multispicatum.

== Distribution ==
Diphasiastrum multispicatum is native to Central Asia (Kazakhstan, Kyrgyzstan, Tajikistan, Turkmenistan and Uzbekistan), parts of Western Asia (Afghanistan, Iran, and Iraq), and China (south-central China, Tibet, and Xinjiang).
