= Chamcook Mountain =

Mountain in New Brunswick, Canada

Coordinates: 45°07′30″N 67°05′00″W

Chamcook Mountain is located 4.6 miles (7.4 km) from St. Andrews, Charlotte County, New Brunswick, Canada. Ice has completely ground over it and the summit, 637 feet (194 m) above sea level, is scored and polished.

== Etymology ==
Chamcook is derived from the Passamaquoddy word of K'tchumcook which, according to William Francis Ganong, has many meanings but none are certain.
