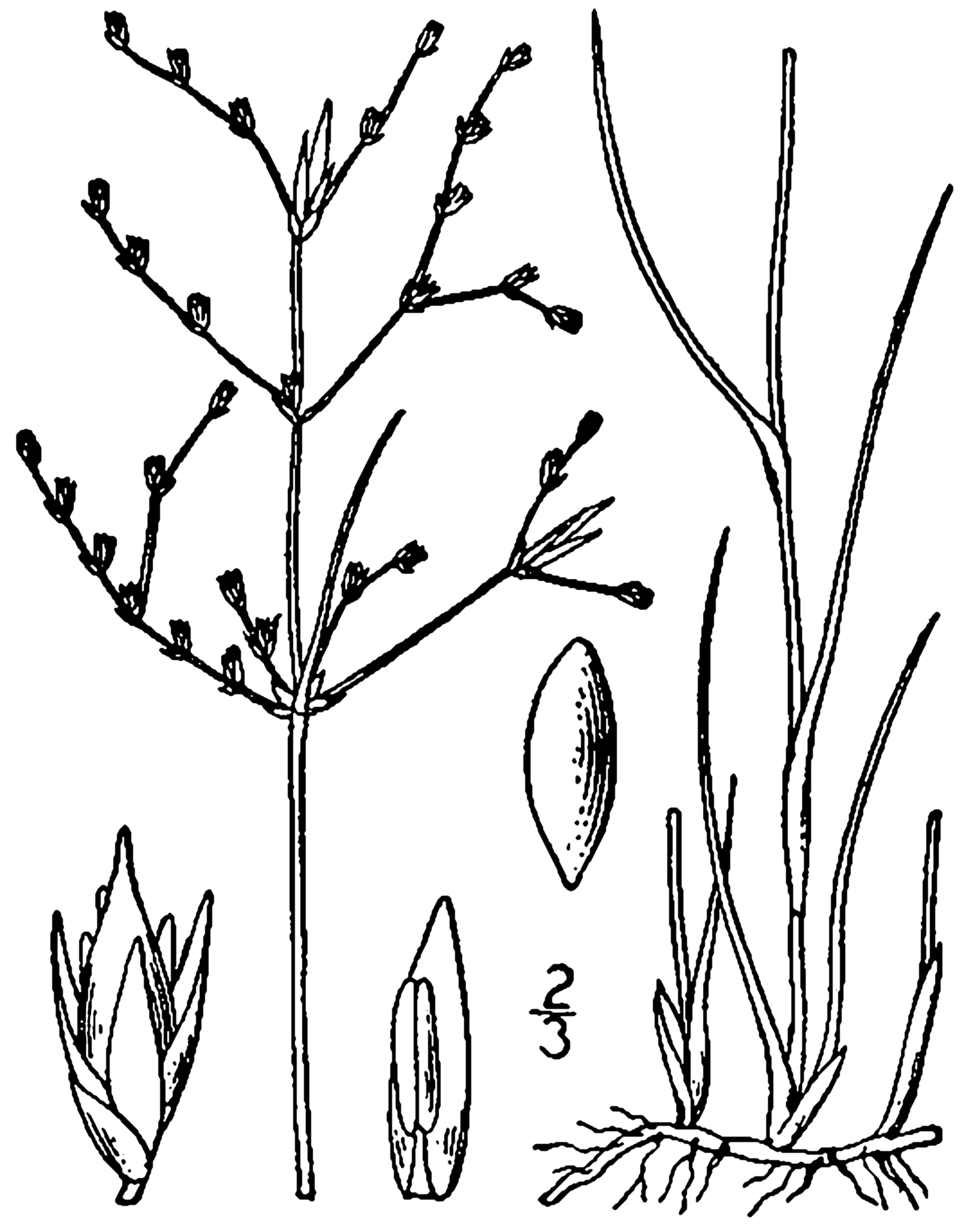
- Botanical illustration

Conservation status
- Least Concern (IUCN 3.1)

Scientific classification
- Kingdom: Plantae
- Clade: Embryophytes
- Clade: Tracheophytes
- Clade: Spermatophytes
- Clade: Angiosperms
- Clade: Monocots
- Clade: Commelinids
- Order: Poales
- Family: Juncaceae
- Genus: Juncus
- Species: J. pelocarpus

Binomial name
- Juncus pelocarpus E.Mey.

Synonyms
- Homotypic Synonyms: Juncus articulatus var. pelocarpus (E.Mey.) A.Gray; Verojuncus pelocarpus (E.Mey.) Záv.Drábk. & Proćków; Heterotypic Synonyms: Juncus abortivus Chapm.; Juncus conradii Tuck.; Juncus muehlenbergii Spreng.; Juncus pelocarpus var. crassicaudex Engelm.; Juncus pelocarpus var. sabulonensis H.St.John; Juncus pelocarpus f. submersus Fassett; Juncus subverticillatus Muhl.; Juncus viviparus Conrad

= Juncus pelocarpus =

Species of plant

Juncus pelocarpus, the brown-fruit rush, is a species of flowering plant in the family Juncaceae, native to British Columbia and eastern Canada, and the north-central and eastern United States. A colonial perennial 1 to 12 in (3 to 30 cm) tall, it is found in wet areas.
