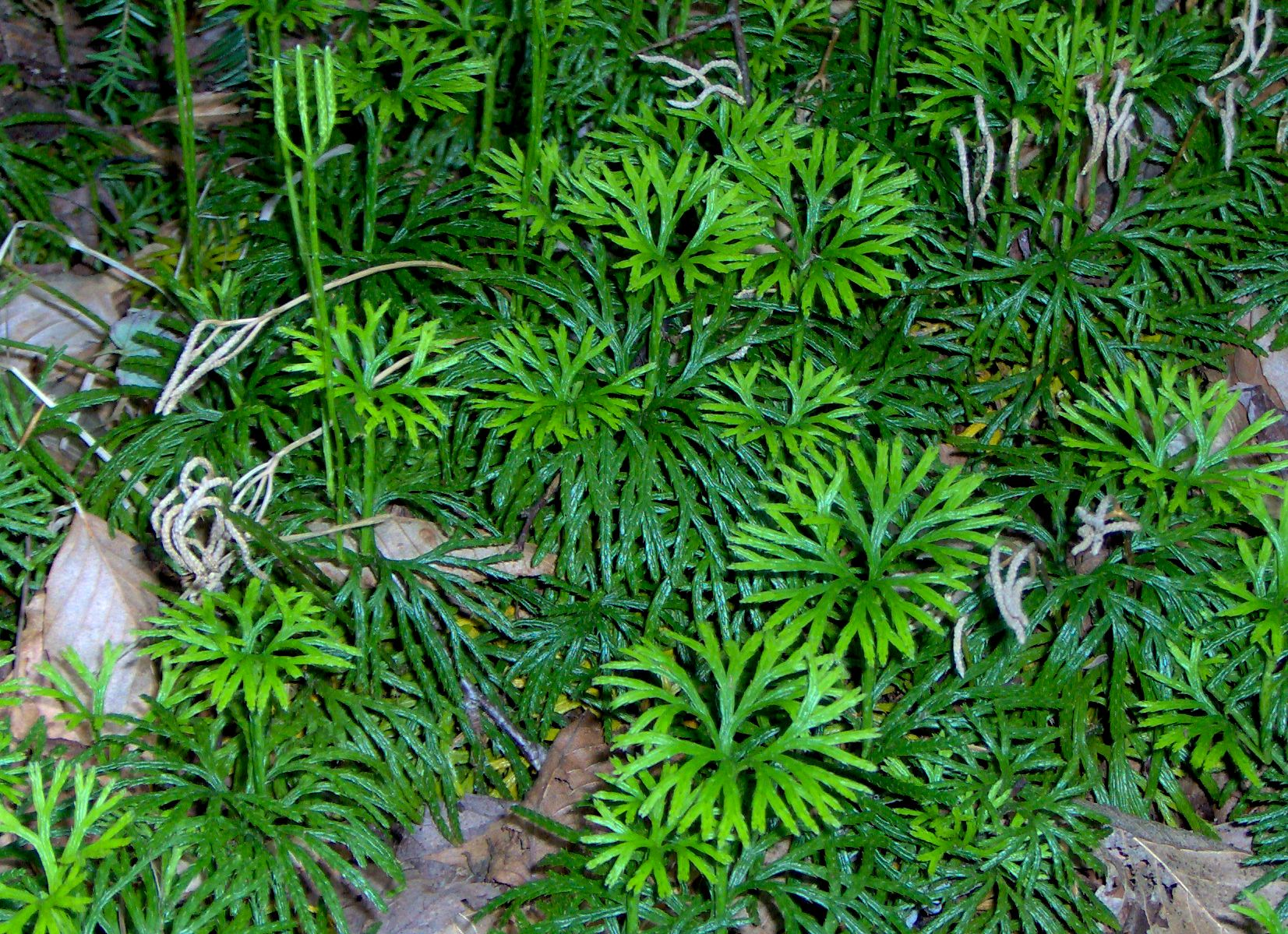

Scientific classification
- Kingdom: Plantae
- Clade: Embryophytes
- Clade: Tracheophytes
- Clade: Lycophytes
- Class: Lycopodiopsida
- Order: Lycopodiales
- Family: Lycopodiaceae
- Genus: Diphasiastrum
- Species: D. digitatum

Binomial name
- Diphasiastrum digitatum (Dill. ex A.Braun) Holub 1975

Synonyms
- Lycopodium digitatum Dill. ex A.Braun 1848; Diphasium flabelliforme (Fern.) Rothm.; Lycopodium complanatum L. var. flabelliforme Fern.; Lycopodium flabelliforme (Fern.) Blanch; Lycopodium flabelliforme var. ambiguum Victorin

= Diphasiastrum digitatum =

Species of plant

Diphasiastrum digitatum is known as groundcedar, running cedar or crowsfoot, along with other members of its genus, but the common name fan clubmoss can be used to refer to it specifically. Other common names include common running-cedar, ground pine and fan ground-pine. It is the most common species of Diphasiastrum in North America. It is a type of plant known as a clubmoss, which is within one of the three main divisions of living vascular plants. It was formerly included in the superspecies Diphasiastrum complanatum. For many years, this species was known as Lycopodium flabelliforme or Lycopodium digitatum. Plants of the World Online (POWO), for example, still considers Diphasiastrum digitatum to be a synonym of Lycopodium digitatum.

Its common name is due to its resemblance to cedar boughs lying on the ground. Its leaves are scale-like and appressed, like a mature cedar, and it is glossy and evergreen. It normally grows to a height of about four inches (10 cm), with the spore-bearing strobili held higher. This plant was once widely harvested and sold as Christmas greenery, and populations were widely depleted for this reason. However, it has recovered throughout its range, and makes large clonal colonies, carpeting the forest floor.

It prefers disturbed areas and coniferous forests, where it can form dense monocultures. The subterranean, brown gametophytes may live for years in the soil before developing vegetative shoots. Its range is in the higher Appalachian mountains northward, and its range ends in northern Georgia and Alabama, but isolated stands have sprung up elsewhere.

In the Appalachian Mountains of Southwest Virginia, the plant is known locally as "Bear's Paw." This species was also once one of the principal clubmoss species used for collection of lycopodium powder, used as a primitive flashpowder.

== Etymology ==
Diphasiastrum: From the genus Diphasium and the suffix -astrum for "incomplete resemblance;" so "false Diphasium".

== Description ==
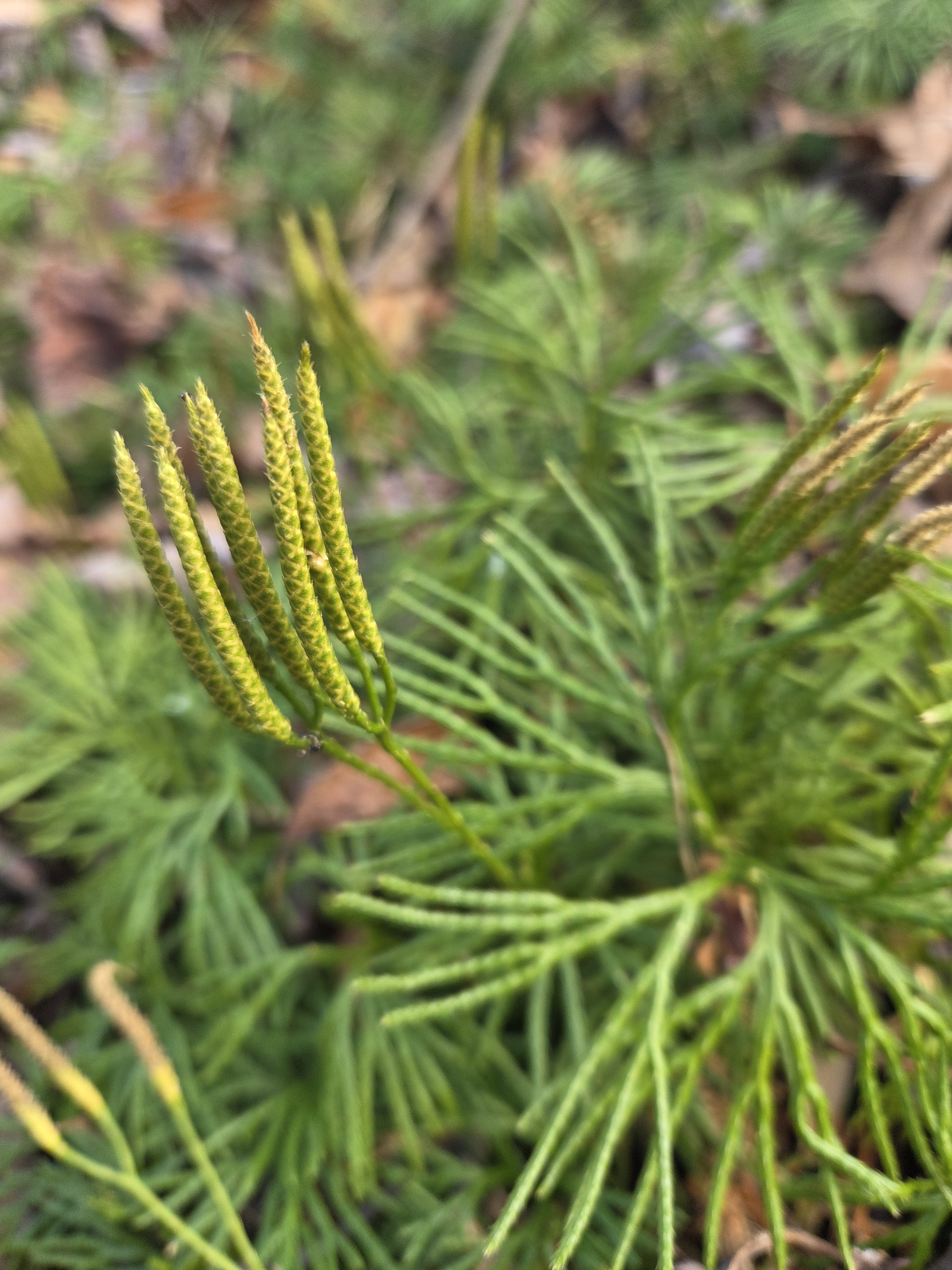
Strobili on peduncles of Diphasiastrum digitatum. Panther Creek State Park, Hamblen County, TN, USA

Diphasiastrum digitatum is a perennial vascular plant that does not contain a significant amount of wood tissue above or at the ground. They are low-growing, usually measuring less than 30 cm (12 in) tall. Leaves are evergreen, which appear opposite, and are arranged spirally with four evenly spaced leaves; when viewed from the side it appears as four columns. The branch leaves are green and shiny, the base extends down to the stem (decurrent) and the free portion at the tip is pointed and scale-like. Branches are shaped rectangular in cross-section, flattened on the underside with the associated leaf much smaller than the rest. The largest leaves are lateral, the free portion appressed to spreading, and the leaves on the upper surface are appressed and are more narrow. The stems spread horizontally above ground or just below the surface of the duff layer. The erect shoots each contain two or more branches near the base. Branches are more likely ascending to spreading, forked and tree-like, and mostly are arranged on the same plane, fan-like. Erect shoots can measure from 3 to 20 in (7.6 to 50.8 cm) tall, although, vegetative shoots are typically less than 8 in (20 cm). Spores develop in cone-like structures referred to as strobili. About 2 to 4 strobili (rarely more) are usually clustered at the tip of a long stalk which is referred to as the peduncle.

== Taxonomy ==
The species Diphasiastrum digitatum belongs to the kingdom Plantae. Its subkingdom is Trachaebionta, its division is Lycopodiophyta. It falls in the class Lycopoiosida, order Lycopodiales, family Lycopodiaceae and the genus is Diphasiastrum L.

== Distribution and habitat ==
Diphasiastrum digitatum is present in dry to mesic and usually acid forests and openings. They are located in the eastern part of North America, including parts of Canada such as Ontario and Quebec, and south to Florida and Louisiana. There are a variety of habitats for Diphasiastrum digitatum, but they are usually found in a partially shaded habitat that is moist to dry. Typically habitats are open forest, thickets, and fields. The sporulating season tends to be from July to October. Other habitats include upland woodlands, bluffs, sandstone cliffs, and abandoned sandy fields. They tend to be found in wooded areas where oak trees and conifers can also be found.

== Uses ==
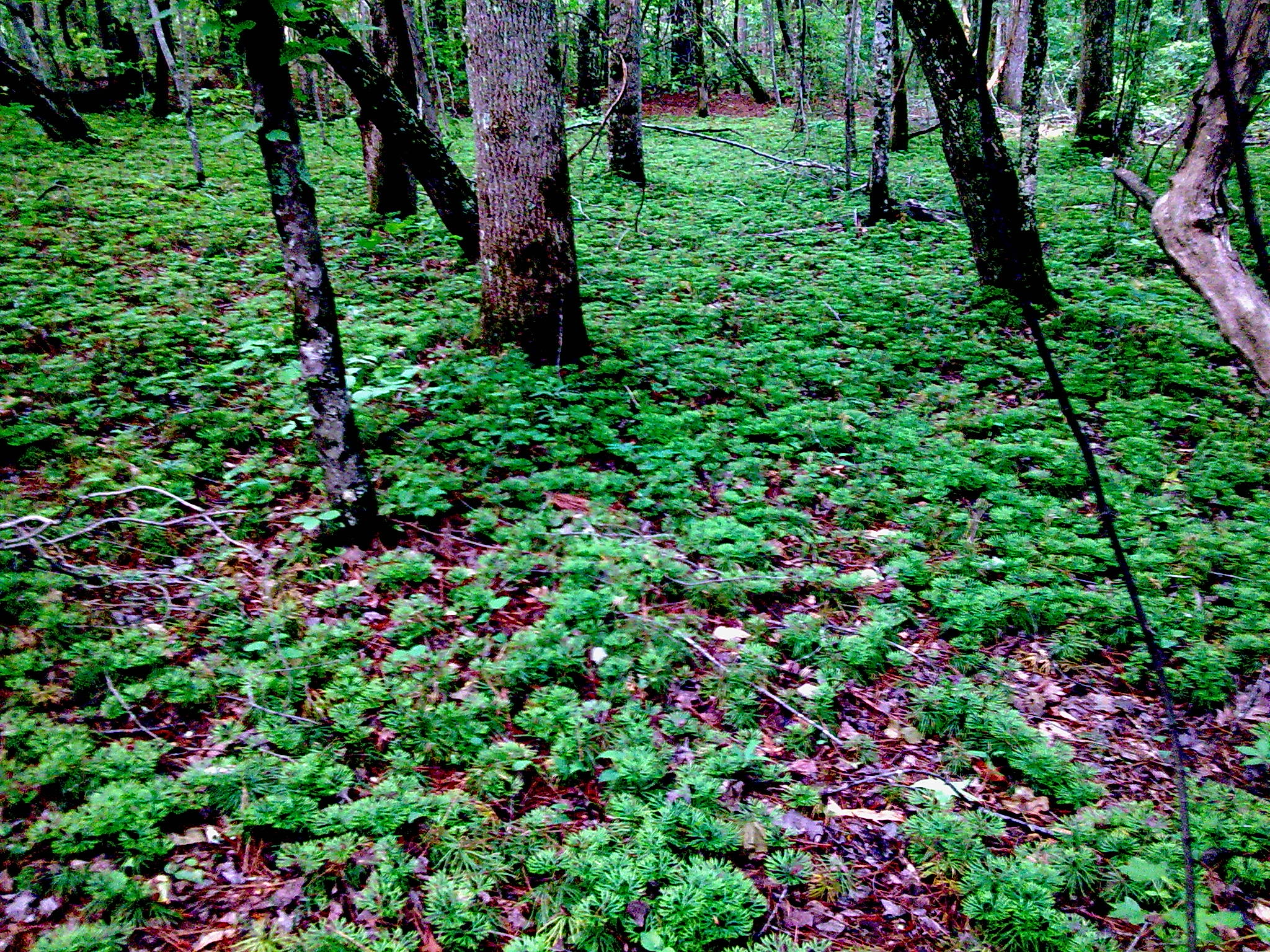
This photograph is of about half of the largest patch of groundcedar in Spalding County, GA.

Diphasiastrum digitatum has uses such as medicinal, pyrotechnic, and decorative purposes. Club moss spores and teas from plant leaves have been used since ancient times in both American Indian and European cultures. Medicinal uses included treating urinary tract problems, diarrhea and other digestive tract problems; relieving headaches and skin ailments; and inducing labor in pregnancy. In some cultures, the spores have been purported to be an aphrodisiac. The spores repel water and have been used as a powder on skin rashes and even on baby bottoms, and to treat wounds. Spores have been used historically as coating for pills, and in the Americas and Europe as fabric dyes. Spores are also highly flammable due to their high content of oil. They have been used culturally for ceremonial purposes when medicine men tossed the spores into a fire for a flash of light. The spores ignite with a bright flash of light and were used in flash photography, in stage productions, in fireworks and in chemistry labs. It is used for mainly bladder disorders, kidney disorders and other conditions, although more evidence is needed regarding effectiveness and safety.

== Cultivation ==
Diphasiastrum digitatum is very difficult to cultivate in the garden. Transplants are rarely successful, and the development of mature plants from spores is very slow (taking perhaps 20 years). They can be grown with frequent application of weak fertilizer solution under bright light, high humidity, and year-round moderate temperatures in greenhouses, growth chambers, and laboratories. During its sexual phase, this species develops underground and requires the presence of appropriate fungi. It prefers a somewhat acidic soil that is sandy or rocky, dappled sunlight to light shade, and well-drained conditions.

== Gallery ==
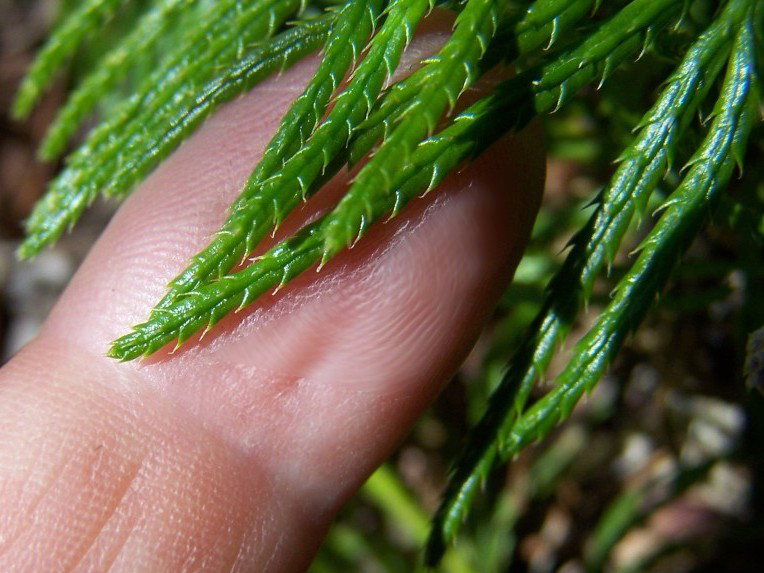
Close-up view of leaf structure
