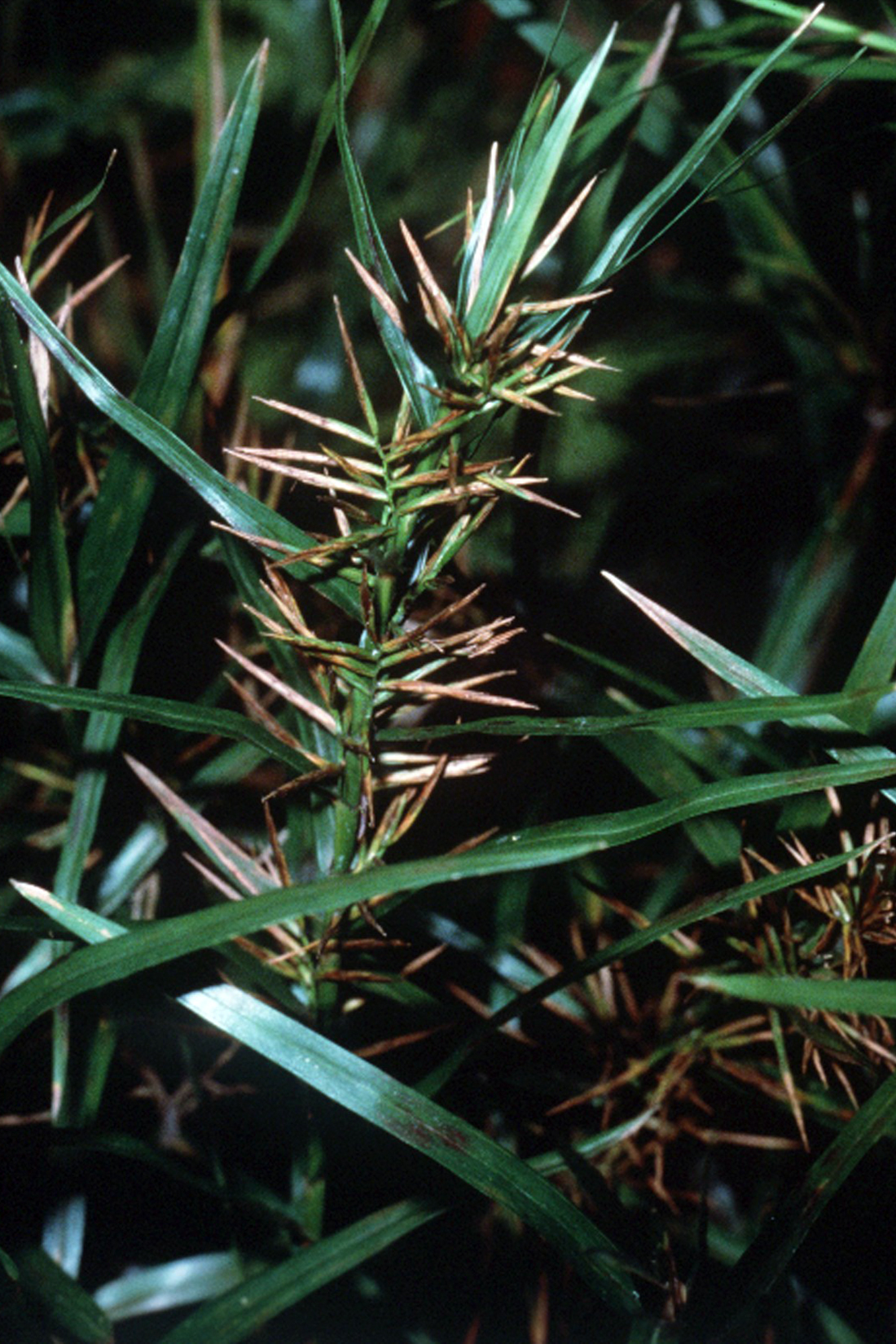

Scientific classification
- Kingdom: Plantae
- Clade: Tracheophytes
- Clade: Angiosperms
- Clade: Monocots
- Clade: Commelinids
- Order: Poales
- Family: Cyperaceae
- Genus: Dulichium; Pers.
- Species: D. arundinaceum

Binomial name
- Dulichium arundinaceum (L.) Britton

Synonyms
- Pleuranthus Pers.; Cyperus arundinaceus L.; Cyperus ferrugineus L.; Schoenus spathaceus L.; Cyperus spathaceus (L.) L.; Scirpus spathaceus (L.) Michx.; Dulichium canadense Rich. in C.H.Persoon; Dulichium spathaceum (L.) Rich. in C.H.Persoon; Schoenus angustifolius Vahl; Sparganium trifidum Poir. in J.B.A.M.de Lamarck; Scirpus tegetalis Burch.

= Dulichium arundinaceum =

Threeway sedge

Species of grass-like plant

Dulichium is a monotypic genus of sedge containing the single species Dulichium arundinaceum, which is known by the common name threeway sedge. This is an aquatic or semi-aquatic plant of the lakes, streams, and ponds of the United States and Canada. It has a wide distribution across the two countries, though noticeably absent from the Dakotas and from the Southwestern Deserts.

Dulichium arundinaceum has a thick rhizome system and grows to heights approaching a meter. It is reminiscent of bamboo in appearance when new, growing bright green erect stalks in large, grassy stands. Stems are round to slightly triangular in cross-section (though not nearly as angularly triangular as in Cyperus or Carex), and hollow. The leaves are in three ranks along the stem when seen from above (thus the common name "threeway sedge"), with sheaths along the stems, and the inflorescence grows from the leaf axilla. The spikelets are generally lance-shaped and one to three centimeters long when ripe.

Two varieties are recognized:

- Dulichium arundinaceum var. arundinaceum - most of species range including Québec
- Dulichium arundinaceum var. boreale Lepage - Québec

== Fossil record ==
One fossil fruit of †Dulichium marginatum has been described from a middle Miocene stratum of the Fasterholt area near Silkeborg in Central Jutland, Denmark.
