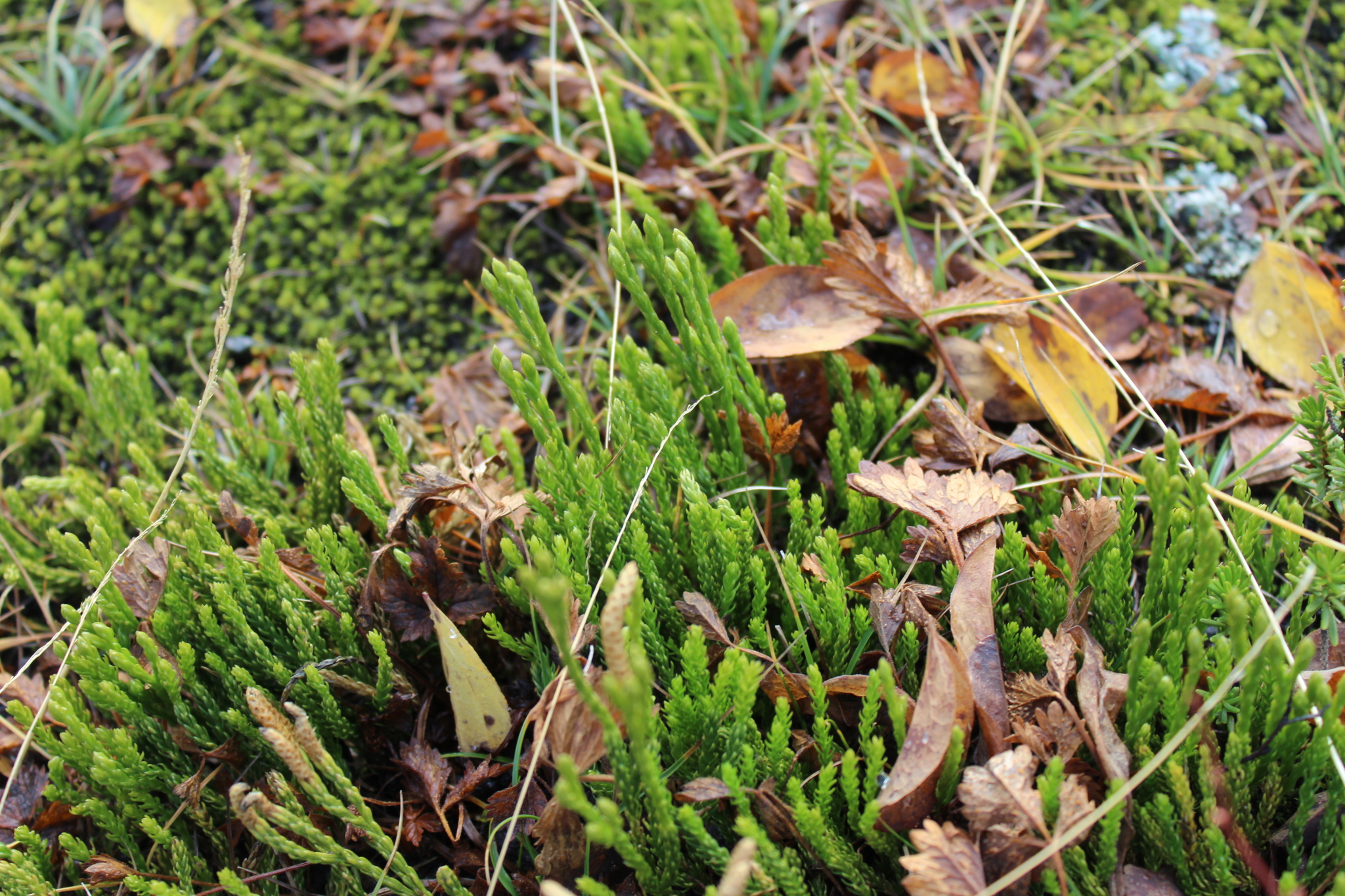

Scientific classification
- Kingdom: Plantae
- Clade: Tracheophytes
- Clade: Lycophytes
- Class: Lycopodiopsida
- Order: Lycopodiales
- Family: Lycopodiaceae
- Genus: Diphasiastrum
- Species: D. sitchense

Binomial name
- Diphasiastrum sitchense (Rupr.) Holub 1975

Synonyms
- Lycopodium sabinifolium subsp. sitchense (Rupr.) Calder & Roy L. Taylor; Lycopodium sabinifolium var. sitchense (Rupr.) Fernald; Lycopodium sabinaefolium subsp. sitchense (Rupr.) Calder & Roy L. Taylor; Lycopodium sabinaefolium var. sitchense (Rupr.) Fernald; Lycopodium sitchense Rupr. 1845; Diphasium sitchense (Rupr.) A. & D. Löve

= Diphasiastrum sitchense =

Species of spore-bearing plant

Diphasiastrum sitchense, the Sitka clubmoss, is a pteridophyte species native to northern North America and northeastern Asia. It is a terrestrial herb spreading by stolons running on the surface or the ground or just slightly below the surface. Leaves are appressed, broadly lanceolate, up to 3.2 mm (0.13 inches) long. Strobili are solitary on the ends of shoots. It is known from every province in Canada, plus the US States of Alaska, Oregon, Washington, Idaho, Montana, Maine, New Hampshire, Vermont, and New York. It is also found in Greenland, St. Pierre and Miquelon, Yukon, Japan, and the Kamchatka Peninsula of Asiatic Russia. It can be found in alpine meadows, open rocky barrens, and coniferous woodlands.
