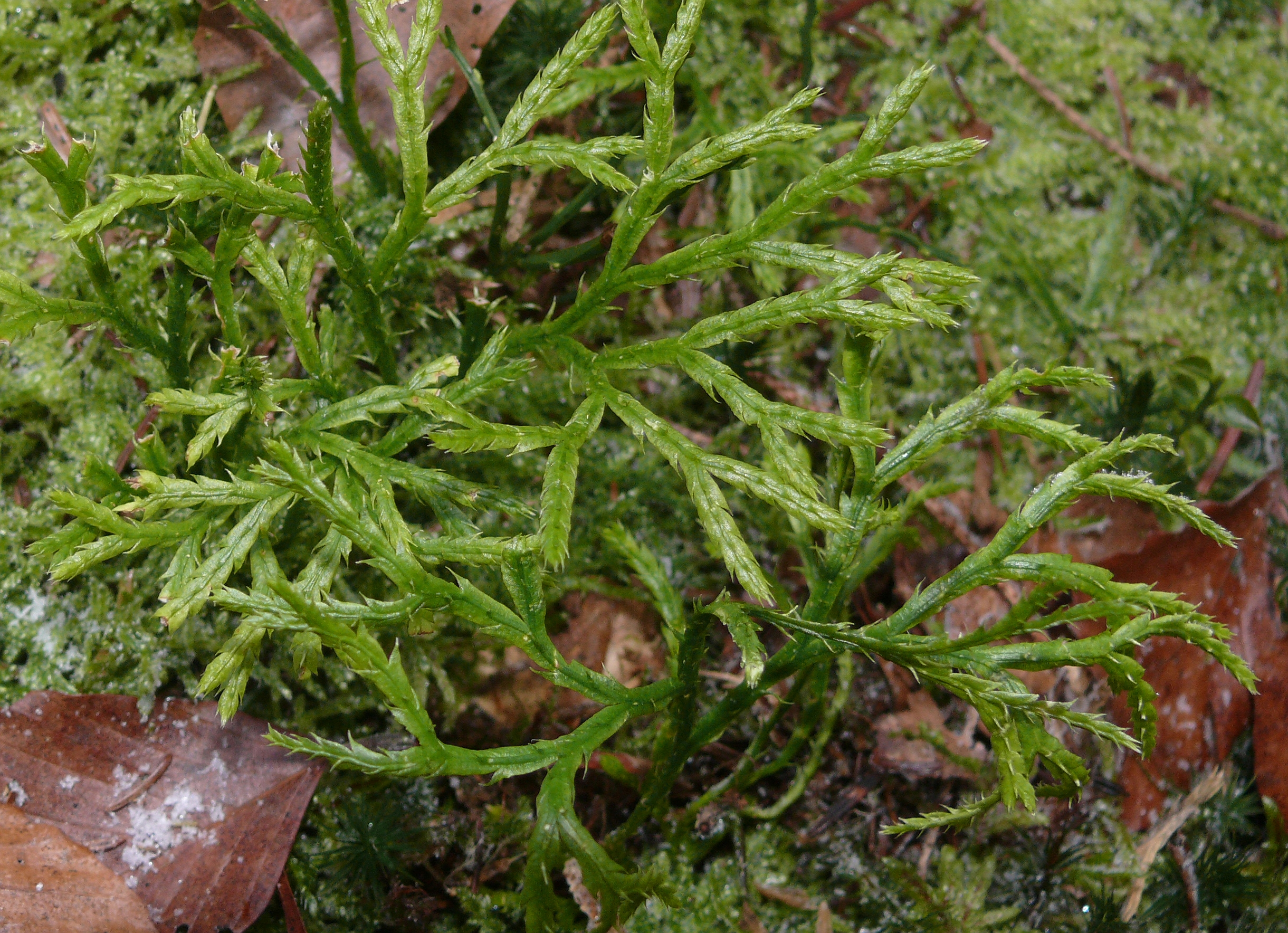

Conservation status
- Secure (NatureServe)

Scientific classification
- Kingdom: Plantae
- Clade: Tracheophytes
- Clade: Lycophytes
- Class: Lycopodiopsida
- Order: Lycopodiales
- Family: Lycopodiaceae
- Genus: Diphasiastrum
- Species: D. complanatum

Binomial name
- Diphasiastrum complanatum (L.) Holub

Synonyms
- Diphasium anceps Á. Löve & D. Löve; Diphasium complanatum (L.) Rothm.; Diphasium wallrothii H.P. Fuchs; Lepidotis complanata (L.) P. Beauv.; Lycopodium complanatum L.; Stachygynandrum complanatum (L.) C. Presl

= Diphasiastrum complanatum =

Species of clubmoss plant from coniferous forests

Diphasiastrum complanatum, common names groundcedar, creeping jenny, or northern running-pine, is a species of clubmoss native to dry coniferous forests in colder northerly parts of the world. Under the original name Lycopodium complanatum, this was an inclusive superspecies that included a number of other species now known to be biologically separate. This plant is an evergreen, perennial pteridophyte. The spores are produced June to September.

== Description ==
Diphasiastrum complanatum is a perennial herb spreading by means of stolons that run along the surface of the ground. Above-ground stems tend to branch within the same geometric plane (hence the specific epithet "complanatum", meaning "same plane"). Strobili are vertical borne in groups of up to 4 at the ends of some of the branches. The stem can reach even over 100 cm in length with offshoots of 5-30 cm long which are upright that are flat at the top. The leaves are scale-like small and parallel to the stem. The sporangium are in long-stalked densely cylindrical spore cones. The shoots on the horizontal plane can take root and eventually form large colonies. Eino Oinonen studied a clonal colony in Finland which measured 250 m (820 ft) in diameter.

== Distribution ==
As the species is currently recognized, it has been found in Canada, Greenland, northern and central Europe including montane regions of the British Isles, Russia, China, Japan, India, Thailand, and the northern United States.

== Uses ==
In Finland Diphasiastrum complanatum has been used to dye wool in the past.
