= Josef Ludwig Holub =

Czech botanist

- Born: 5 February 1930; Mladá Boleslav, Czechoslovakia
- Died: 23 July 1999 (aged 69); Mladá Boleslav, Czech Republic
- Education: Charles University in Prague
- Scientific career
- Fields: Botany
- Workplaces: Czech Institute of Botany
- Author abbrev. (botany): Holub

Josef Ludwig Holub (5 February 1930 – 23 July 1999) was a Czech botanist. He described a number of new species, worked on systematic reorganization of botanical groups, and contributed greatly to the study of European flora.

== Biography ==
Josef Holub was born on 5 February 1930 in Mladá Boleslav. He studied at Charles University in Prague, becoming a lecturer in botany in 1953.

He co-founded the Czech Institute of Botany where he worked for many years. He also helped create the Department of Biosystematics, and the journal Folia, published by the Geobotanical and Phytotaxonomic Institute. In 1991, he was named president of the Czech Botanical Society. He participated in many botanical field studies in central Europe.

== Work ==
He worked on vascular plant taxonomy. He contributed to economic botany, especially with his work on the flora of Slovakia and the Czech Republic.

- Holub, J et al. 1967. "Sobrevista de las unidades de vegetación superior de Checoslovaquia", Rozpr.Čs.Acad. Sci. Praga: 77/3: 1-75

He performed extensive work on the order Lycopodiales and the systematics of the Equisetaceae. He also made substantial contributions to the studies of the fern genera Dryopteris, Lastraea, and Thelypteris.

Other plant genera he worked on included Helictotrichon, Avenula, Rubus and Crataegus. He was a principal author of Flora of the Czech Republic and the Flora of Slovakia.

Holub contributed to the lists of threatened species for several regions, contributing the Redbook of Endangered Species.
