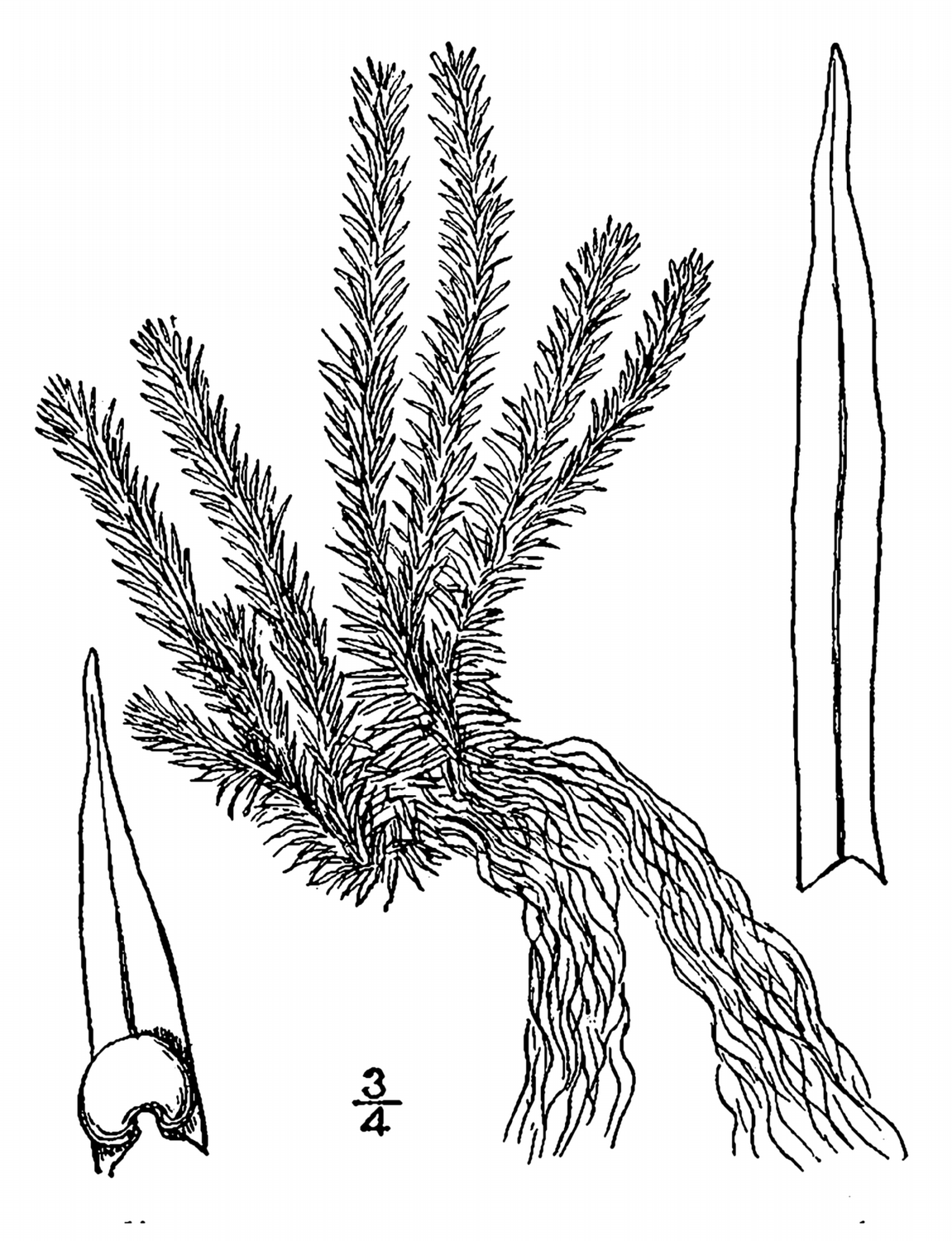
- 1913 illustration

Conservation status
- Apparently Secure (NatureServe)

Scientific classification
- Kingdom: Plantae
- Clade: Tracheophytes
- Clade: Lycophytes
- Class: Lycopodiopsida
- Order: Lycopodiales
- Family: Lycopodiaceae
- Genus: Huperzia
- Species: H. porophila

Binomial name
- Huperzia porophila (Lloyd & Underw.) Holub 1985

Synonyms
- Lycopodium lucidulum var. porophilum (F.E. Lloyd & Underw.) Clute; Lycopodium porophilum F.E. Lloyd & Underw. 1900; Lycopodium selago var. porophilum (F.E. Lloyd & Underw.) Clute; Urostachys lucidulus var. porophilus (F.E. Lloyd & Underw.) Nessel

= Huperzia porophila =

Rock firmoss

Species of spore-bearing plant

Huperzia porophila, the rock clubmoss or rock firmoss, grows throughout the Appalachian province of the Eastern United States and central Canada, from Ontario south to Georgia and Alabama. It is rare east of the Appalachians, being most common in a north–south belt along the western plateau area.

Huperzia porophila grows only on or over rock and requires cool, moist, shaded, acid spots. It is a beautiful sight growing over boulders and outcrops. It is often confused with the shining firmoss (Huperzia lucidula) whose range it largely shares and which also typically grows on rocks. The rock firmoss leaves, 3–8 mm long, are generally not shiny like those of the shining firmoss, and the ascending 12–15 cm stems are rarely branched. Unlike H. lucidula, it only grows as individual plants and not as dense colonies. One of the best sites for viewing this species is in the Hocking Hills in southeast Ohio.

This species is of hybrid origin, the parents being Huperzia lucidula and Huperzia selago.

H. porophila hybridizes with H. lucidula to produce the sterile hybrid H. × bartleyi.

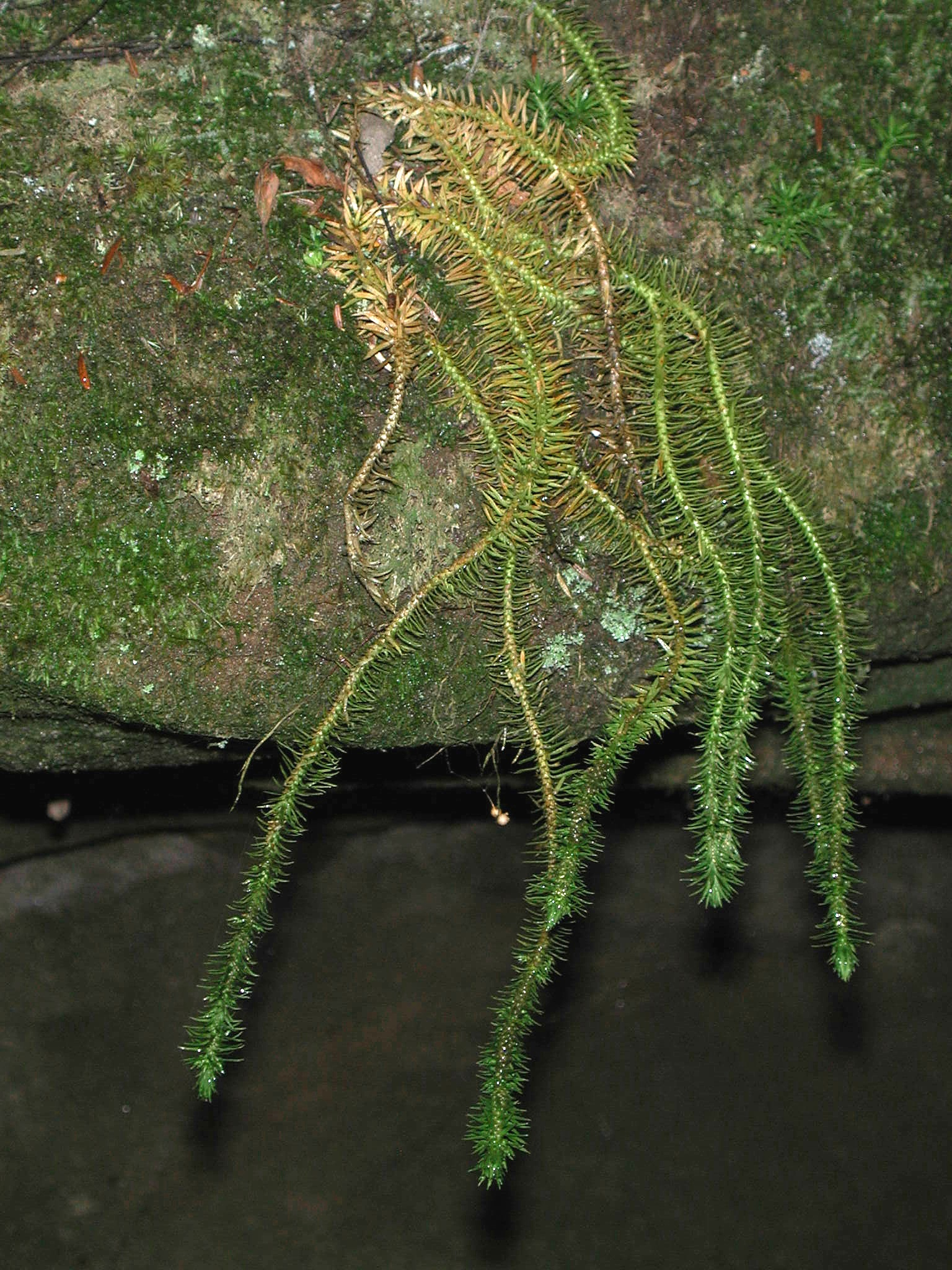
Huperzia porophila, rock firmoss

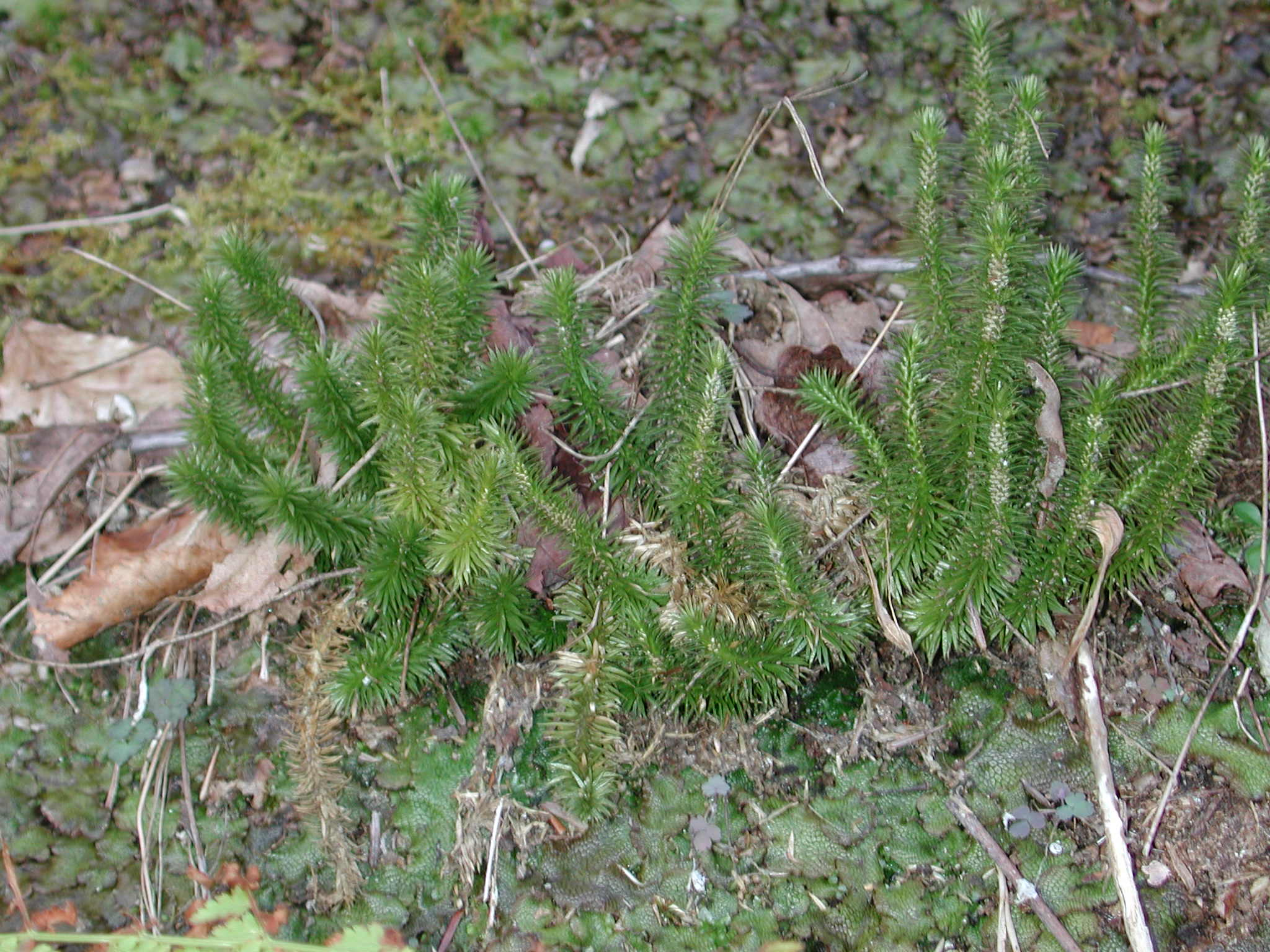
Huperzia porophila, rock firmoss
