= H. australiana =

H. australiana may refer to:

- Hedera australiana, a synonym of Polyscias australiana
- Huperzia australiana, a fir-moss
- Hyadesia australiana, a mite
