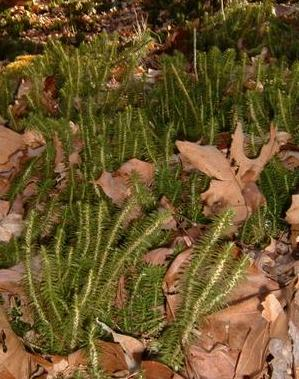
- Shining firmoss, Huperzia lucidula

Scientific classification
- Kingdom: Plantae
- Clade: Tracheophytes
- Clade: Lycophytes
- Class: Lycopodiopsida
- Order: Lycopodiales
- Family: Lycopodiaceae
- Subfamily: Huperzioideae; W.H.Wagner & Beitel ex B.Øllg.

Genera
- Huperzia Bernh.; Phlegmariurus Holub; Phylloglossum Kunze

= Huperzioideae =

Subfamily of plants

Huperzioideae is a subfamily of lycopsids in the family Lycopodiaceae. It has sometimes been recognized as a separate family, Huperziaceae. The Pteridophyte Phylogeny Group classification of 2016 (PPG I) recognizes three extant genera:

- Huperzia (temperate firmosses); about 25 species; terrestrial.
- Phlegmariurus (tropical firmosses); about 250 species; previously included in Huperzia; mainly epiphytes.
- Phylloglossum (pygmy clubmoss); formerly thought to be only distantly related to Huperzia. This is a terrestrial, grass-like plant with basal, 2–5 cm long, fleshy leaves. The only accepted species is Phylloglossum drummondii.

The plants are distinct from those of other members of the Lycopodiaceae in having erect (not creeping) growth; and in their spore-bearing structures being produced in the axils of unmodified leaves, rather than in terminal club-like structures. The subfamily also has a basal chromosome count of n=67, versus counts of n=23, 34 in the Lycopodiaceae.
