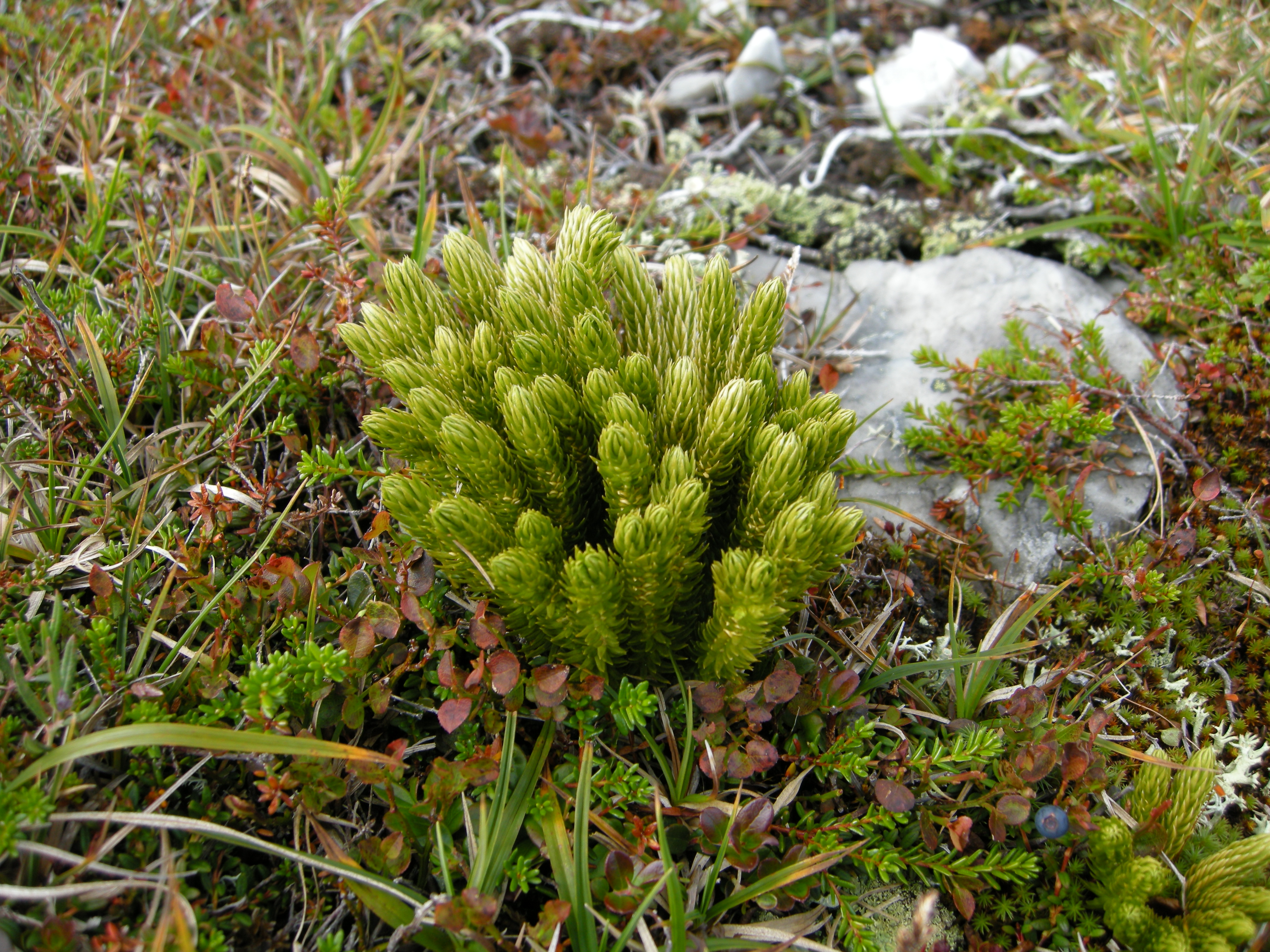
- Huperzia appressa growing on Åklinuten in Norway's Blefjell range at an elevation about 1,300 metres (4,300 ft)

Scientific classification
- Kingdom: Plantae
- Clade: Tracheophytes
- Clade: Lycophytes
- Class: Lycopodiopsida
- Order: Lycopodiales
- Family: Lycopodiaceae
- Genus: Huperzia
- Species: H. appressa

Binomial name
- Huperzia appressa (Desv.) Á. Löve & D. Löve

Synonyms
- List: Huperzia arctica (Tolm.) Sipliv.; Huperzia selago subsp. arctica (Tolm.) Á.Löve & D.Löve; Huperzia selago subsp. appressa (Bach.Pyl. ex Desv.) D.Löve; Huperzia selago var. appressa (Bach.Pyl. ex Desv.) Ching; Lycopodium appressum (Bach.Pyl. ex Desv.) Petrov; Lycopodium selago subsp. appressum (Bach.Pyl. ex Desv.) Hultén; Lycopodium selago f. appressum (Bach.Pyl. ex Desv.) Gelert; Lycopodium selago var. appressum Bach.Pyl. ex Desv.; Lycopodium selago subsp. arcticum Tolm.; Urostachys selago var. appressus (Bach.Pyl. ex Desv.) Herter ex Nessel

= Huperzia appressa =

Species of spore-bearing plant

Huperzia appressa, commonly known as Appalachian firmoss, is a non-flowering species of plant in the family Lycopodiaceae. It has been reported from the United States, Canada, China, Russia, and several European countries. It is a terrestrial plant up to 10 cm tall, with dichotomously branched stems.
