= Coltsfoot Rock =

British confection

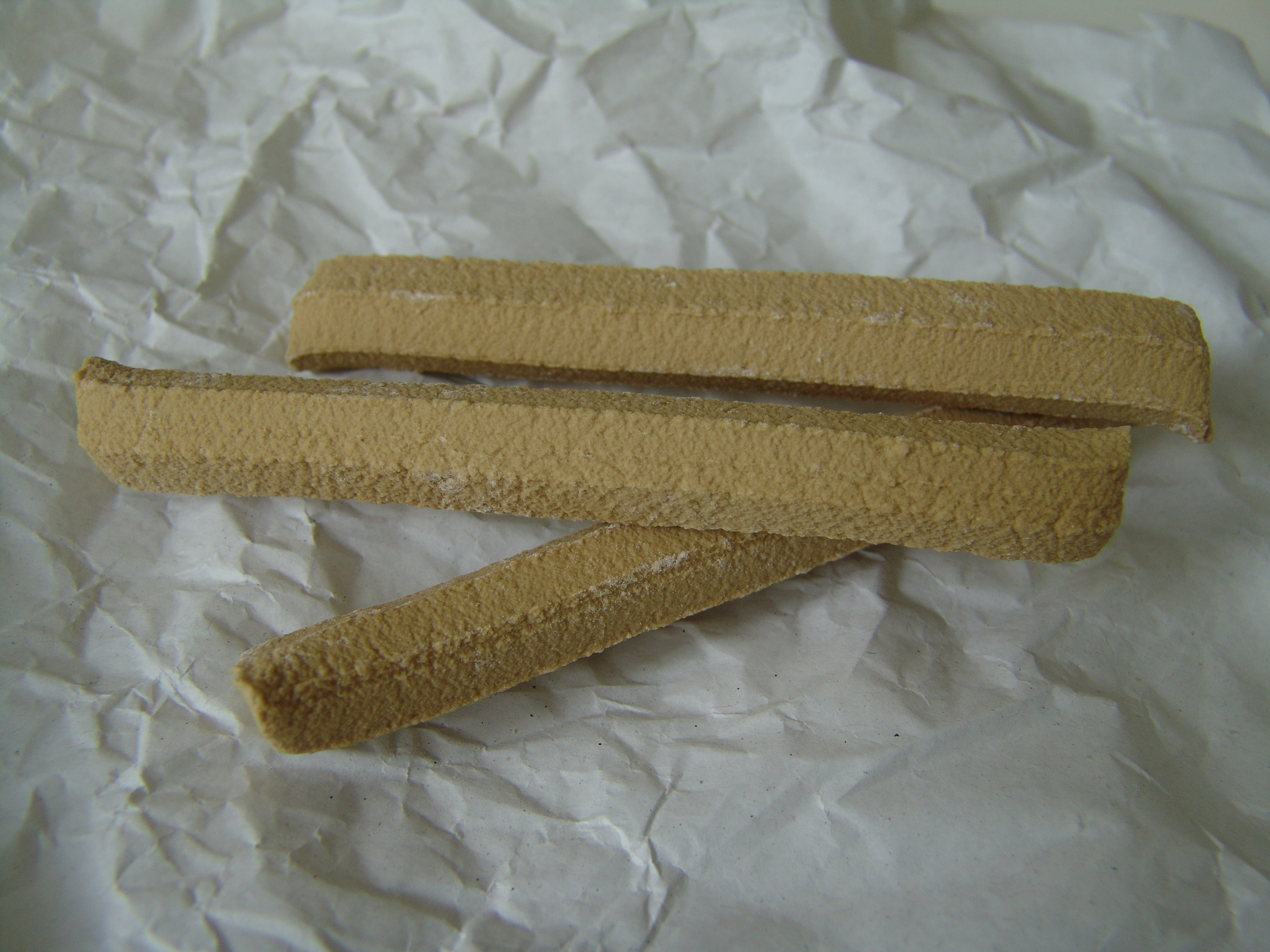
Three sticks of Coltsfoot Rock.

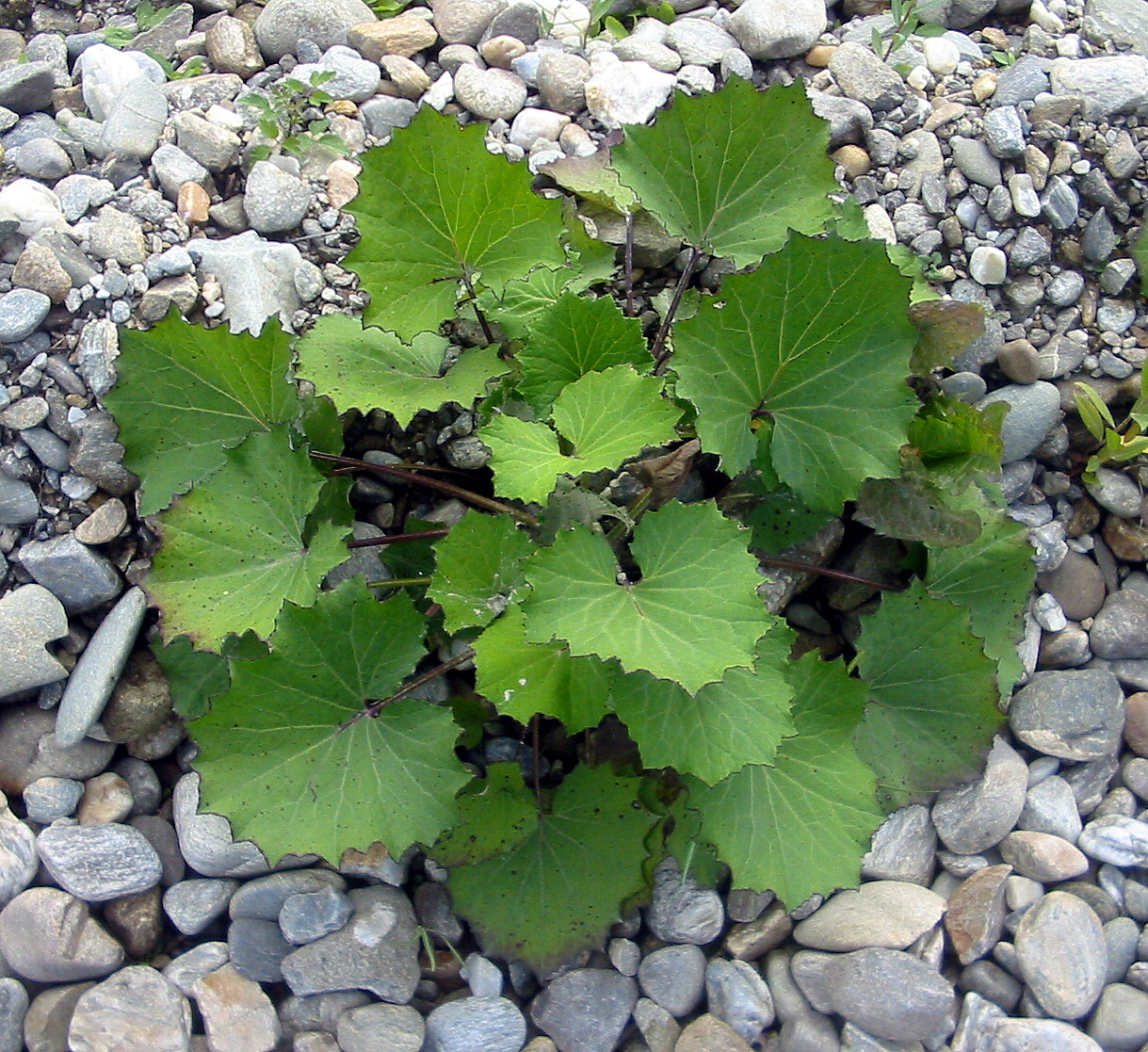
The hoof-shaped leaves of the coltsfoot plant.

Coltsfoot Rock is a confectionary created from coltsfoot extract by the UK confectioners Stockley's Sweets, based in Oswaldtwistle, Lancashire, England. As a product, it is a hardened stick of brittle rock candy flavoured with coltsfoot.

Coltsfoot rock has gained acknowledgements from the UK Regional Tourism Board, Lancashire Tourism Council and culinary organisations such as Gourmet Britain.

The recipe is secret to Stockley's Sweets and, as they are the only manufacturer, all products that are labelled as such have originated from Stockley's traditional factory.

The history and popularity of the confectionery comes from its supposed medicinal benefits; originally the leaves of the coltsfoot plant were dried and then smoked, and this was thought to have relieved asthma.
