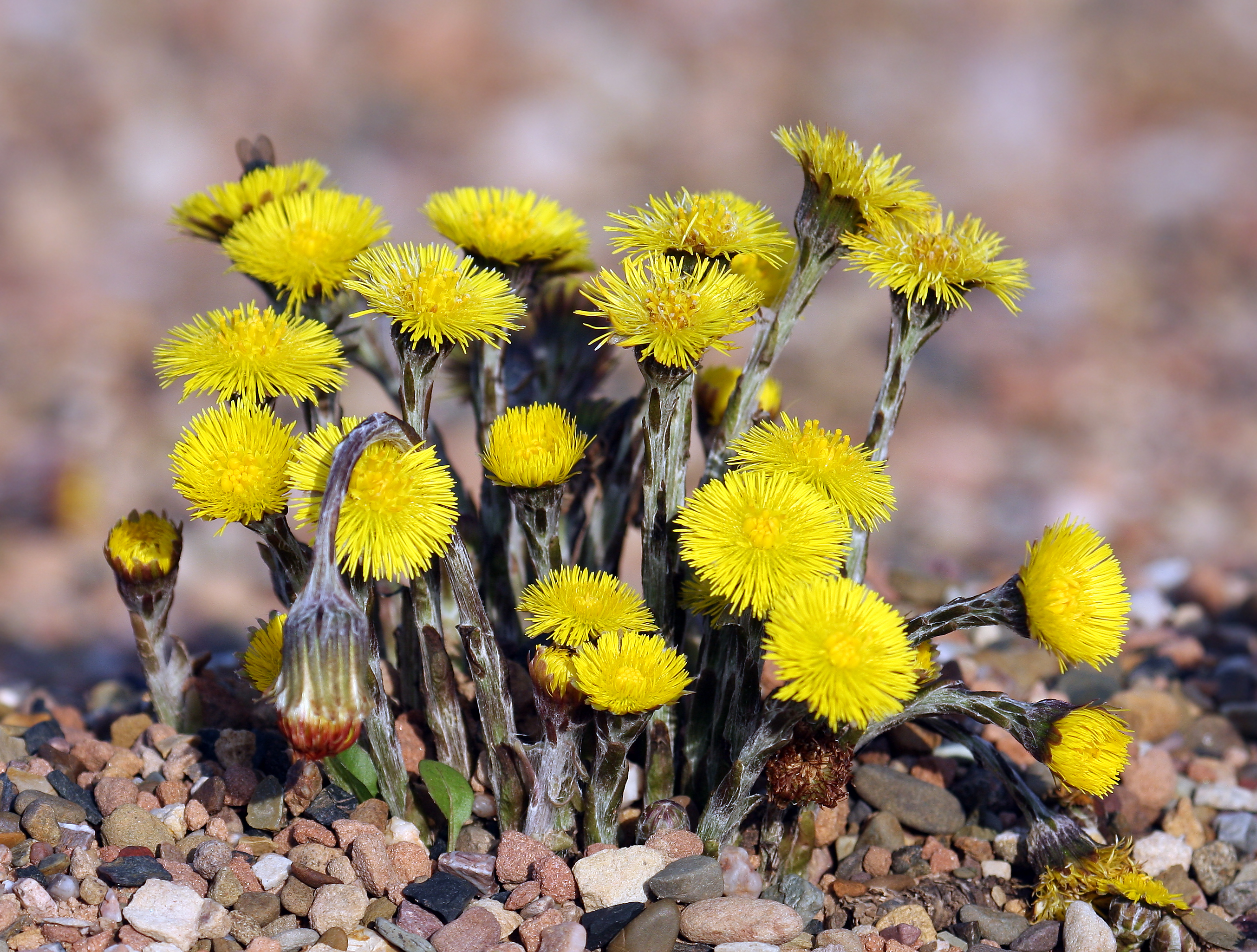

Scientific classification
- Kingdom: Plantae
- Clade: Tracheophytes
- Clade: Angiosperms
- Clade: Eudicots
- Clade: Asterids
- Order: Asterales
- Family: Asteraceae
- Subfamily: Asteroideae
- Tribe: Senecioneae
- Genus: Tussilago; L.
- Species: T. farfara

Binomial name
- Tussilago farfara L.

Synonyms
- Farfara Gilib.; Farfara radiata Gilib.; Tussilago alpestris Hegetschw.; Cineraria farfara (L.) Bernh.; Tussilago umbertina Borbás

= Tussilago =

Coltsfoot

Species of flowering plant in the daisy family

Tussilago farfara, commonly known as coltsfoot, is a plant in the tribe Senecioneae in the family Asteraceae, native to Europe and parts of western and central Asia. The name "tussilago" is derived from the Latin tussis, meaning cough, and ago, meaning to cast or to act on. It has had uses in traditional medicine, but the discovery of toxic pyrrolizidine alkaloids in the plant has resulted in liver health concerns.

Tussilago farfara is the only accepted species in the genus Tussilago, although more than two dozen other species have at one time or another been considered part of this group. Most of them are now regarded as members of other genera (Chaptalia, Chevreulia, Farfugium, Homogyne, Leibnitzia, Petasites, Senecio).

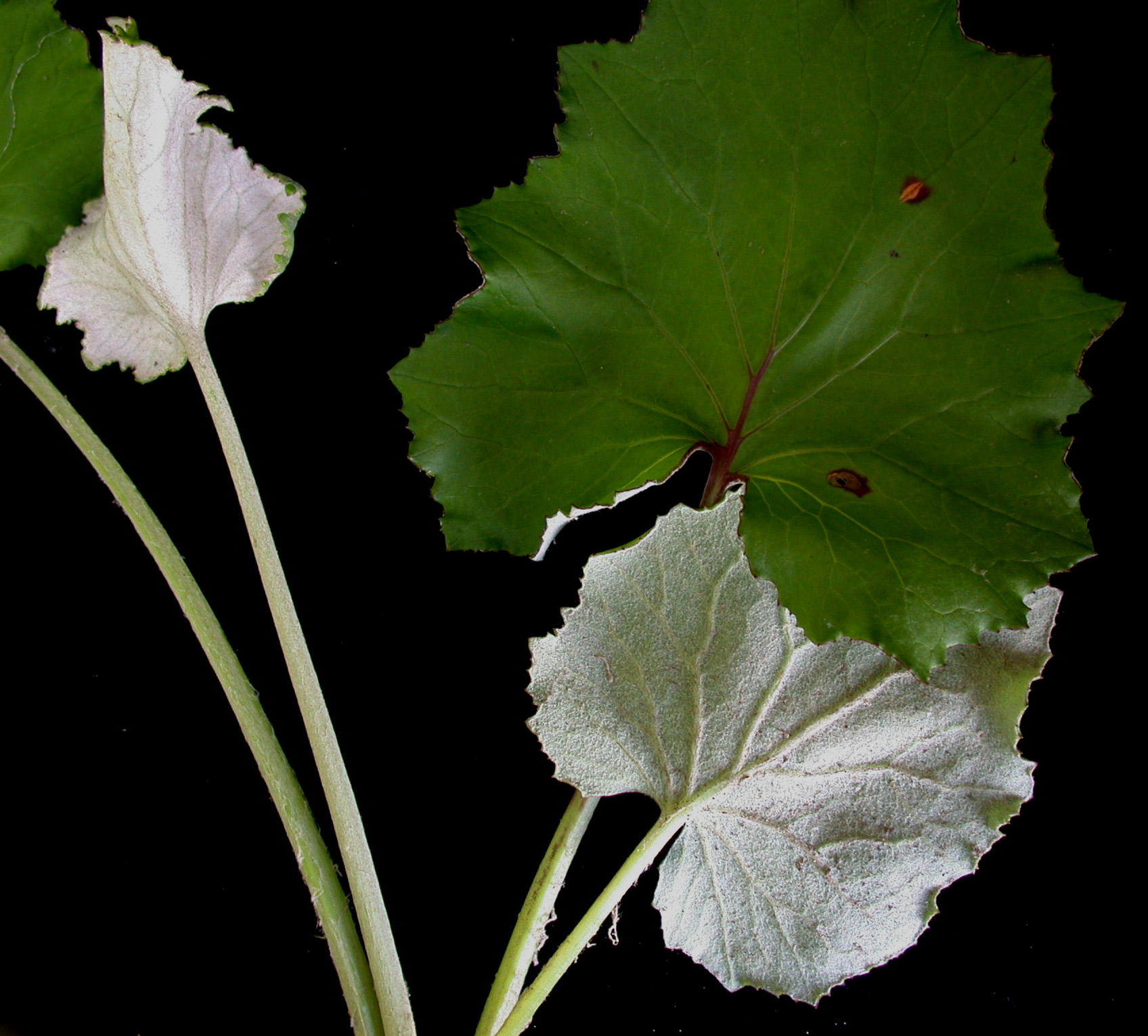
Foliage showing the white underside of Tussilago farfara

== Description ==
Coltsfoot is a perennial herbaceous plant that spreads by seeds and rhizomes. Tussilago is often found in colonies of dozens of plants. The flowers, which superficially resemble dandelions, bear scale-leaves on the long stems in early spring. The leaves of coltsfoot, which appear after the flowers have set seed, wither and die in the early summer. The flower heads are of yellow florets with an outer row of bracts. The plant is typically 5–15 cm (2.0–5.9 in) in height. The leaves have angular teeth on their margins.

Coltsfoot has a seasonal growth pattern in which flowering and seed production happen before the development of its main foliage. Flower buds develop during the preceding growing season and the flowering stems emerge in early spring. Coltsfoot then produces its characteristic large leaves that support photosynthesis in the growing season.

The underground rhizomes let the plant expand existing colonies through vegetative reproduction. Previously connected shoots can become physically independent and still remain genetically identical.

== Distribution ==
Coltsfoot is widespread across Europe, Asia, and North Africa, from Svalbard to Morocco and eastward to China and the Russian Far East. It is also a common plant in North and South America where it has been introduced, most likely by settlers as a medicinal item, or to provide early blooms for honeybees. The plant is often found in waste and disturbed places and along roadsides and paths. In some areas it is considered an invasive species.

In its introduced North American range, Coltsfoot frequently occurs in habitats with soil disturbance and without established vegetation. Wind dispersed seeds enables to Coltsfoot colonize new suitable areas and rhizomes enable Coltsfoot to spread locally.

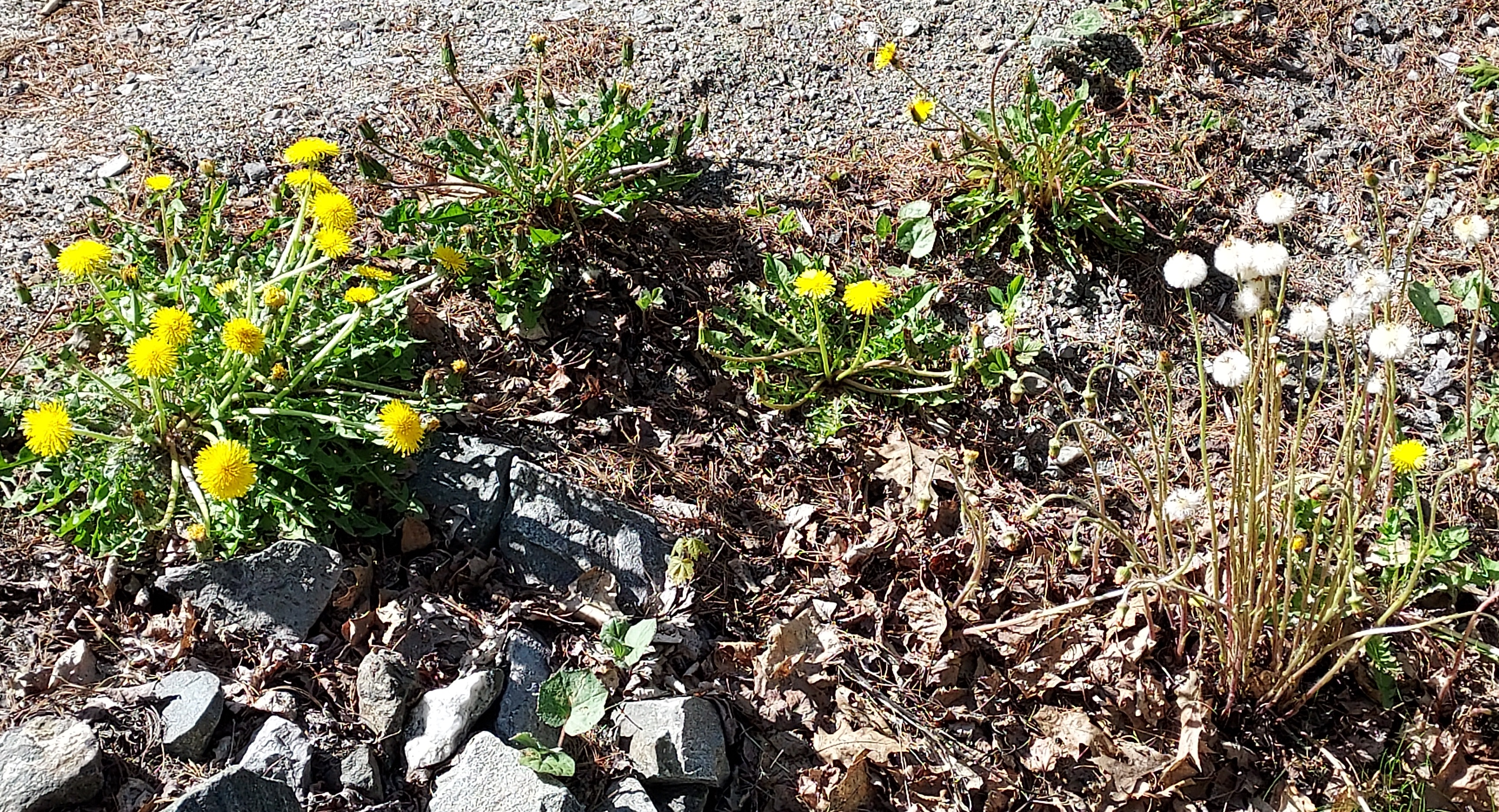
Comparing dandelion with coltsfoot, in early May. The dandelion is just blooming, but the coltsfoot has already gone to seed. Note that the coltsfoot has no leaves yet.

== Name ==
The common name comes from the leaf's supposed resemblance in shape to a colt's foot. It is a 16th-century translation of the medieval Latin name pes pulli, meaning "foal's foot". Other common names include tash plant, ass's foot, bull's foot, coughwort (Old English), farfara, foal's foot, foalswort, and horse foot. Sometimes it is confused with Petasites frigidus, or western coltsfoot.

It has been called bechion, bechichie, or bechie, from the Ancient Greek word for "cough". Also ungula caballina ("horse hoof"), and chamæleuce.

== Uses ==
Coltsfoot has been used in herbal medicine and has been consumed as a food product with some confectionery products, such as Coltsfoot Rock. Tussilago farfara leaves have been used in traditional Austrian medicine internally (as tea or syrup) or externally (directly applied) for treatment of disorders of the respiratory tract, skin, locomotor system, viral infections, flu, colds, fever, rheumatism and gout. An extract of the fresh leaves has also been used to make cough drops and hard candy.

Coltsfoot is used as a food plant by the larvae of some Lepidoptera species including the Gothic and small angle shades. It is also visited by honeybees, providing pollen and nectar.

At the Christian camp for boys Deerfoot Lodge in the Adirondacks, campers use Coltsfoot leaves as "Larry Leaf Bombs" to throw in a game of recreational naval warfare called "Naval Battle" encompasing the entire campsite.

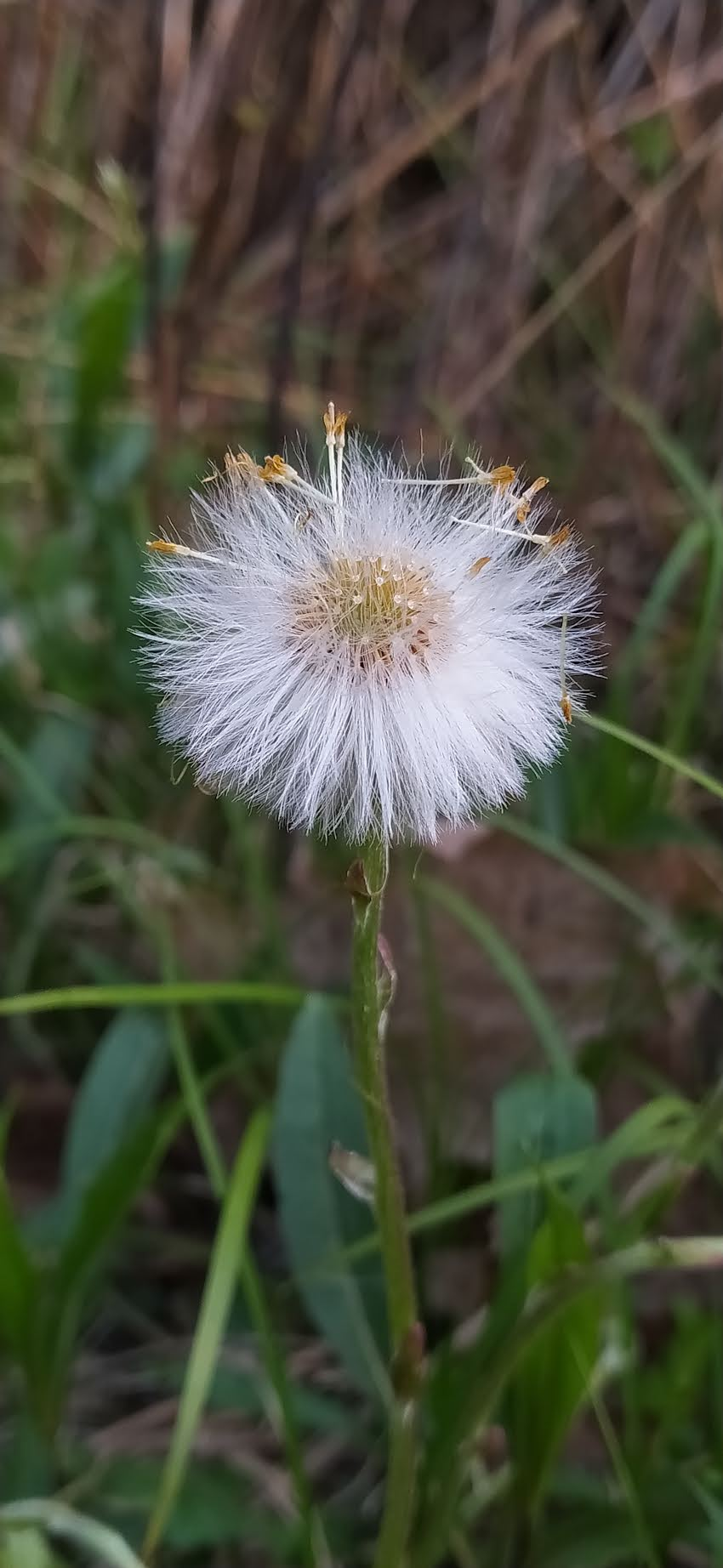
Fruit of coltsfoot with pappus

== Toxicity ==
Tussilago farfara contains tumorigenic pyrrolizidine alkaloids. Senecionine and senkirkine, present in coltsfoot, have the highest mutagenetic activity of any pyrrolozidine alkaloid, tested using Drosophila melanogaster to produce a comparative genotoxicity test.

Two cases of supposed liver damage (and death) due to coltsfoot tea have been shown to actually be the result of mistaken identity. In one, coltsfoot tea causing severe liver problems in an infant was actually the result of Adenostyles alliariae (alpendost). In another case, an infant developed liver disease and died because the mother drank tea originally believed to contain coltsfoot during her pregnancy, but which was later shown to be Petasites hybridus (butterbur) or a similar species. In one 27-year-old male, ingesting a multicomponent herbal supplement that included coltsfoot may have caused him to develop non-lethal deep vein thrombosis and pulmonary embolism.

In response, the German government banned the sale of coltsfoot. Clonal plants of coltsfoot free of pyrrolizidine alkaloids were then developed in Austria and Germany. This has resulted in the development of the registered variety Tussilago farfara 'Wien', which has no detectable levels of these alkaloids.

== See also ==
- List of herbs with known adverse effects
