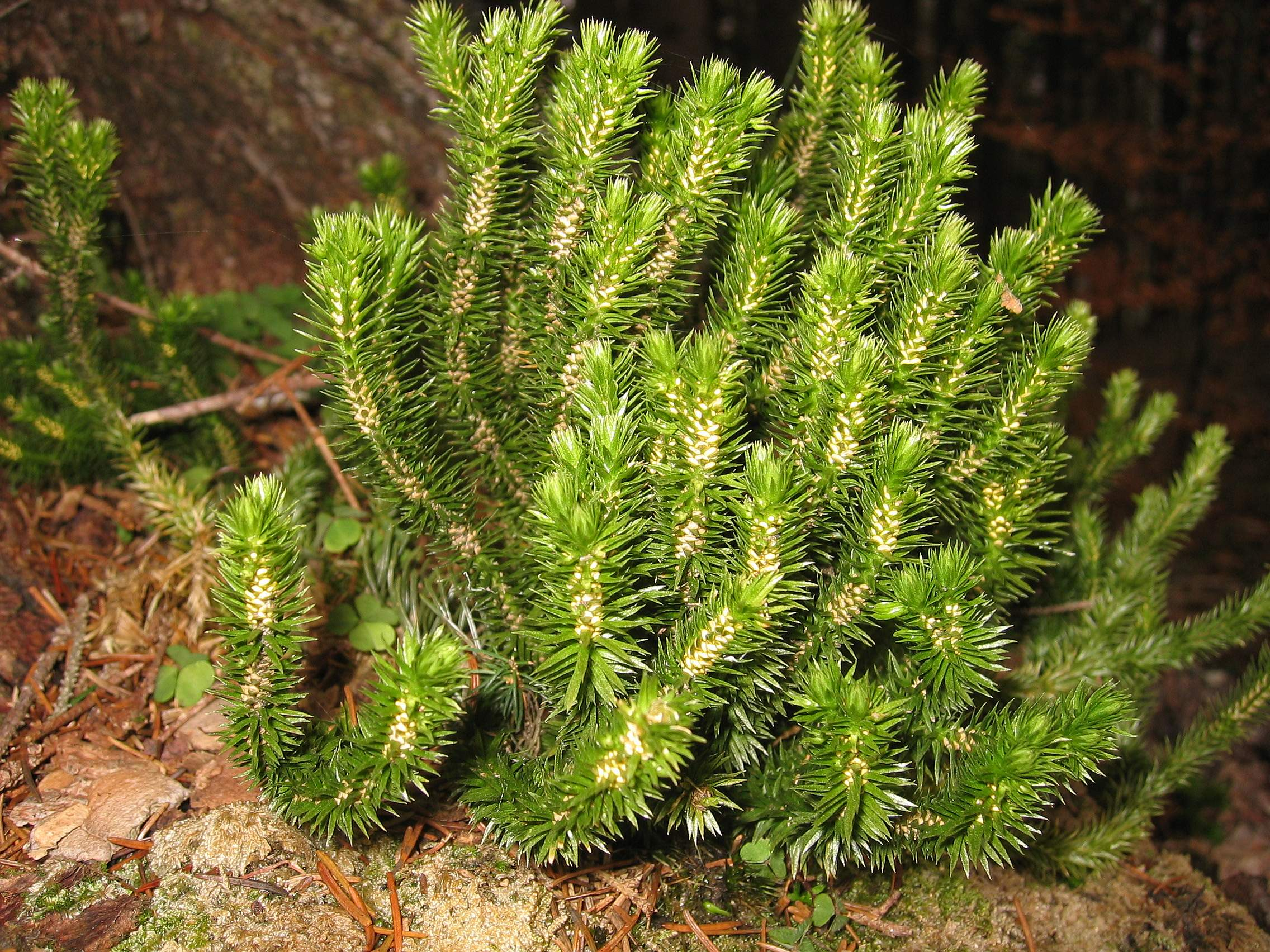

Conservation status
- Secure (NatureServe)

Scientific classification
- Kingdom: Plantae
- Clade: Embryophytes
- Clade: Tracheophytes
- Clade: Lycophytes
- Class: Lycopodiopsida
- Order: Lycopodiales
- Family: Lycopodiaceae
- Genus: Huperzia
- Species: H. selago

Binomial name
- Huperzia selago (L.) Bernh. ex Schrank & Mart.

Synonyms
- Lycopodium selago L.; Lycopodium selago var. patens (Beauv.) Desv.; Plananthus selago (L.) Beauv.; Urostachys selago (L.) Herter

= Huperzia selago =

Huperzia selago Temporal range: 200–0 Ma Early Jurassic (Hettangian) - Present

Species of plant in the clubmoss family

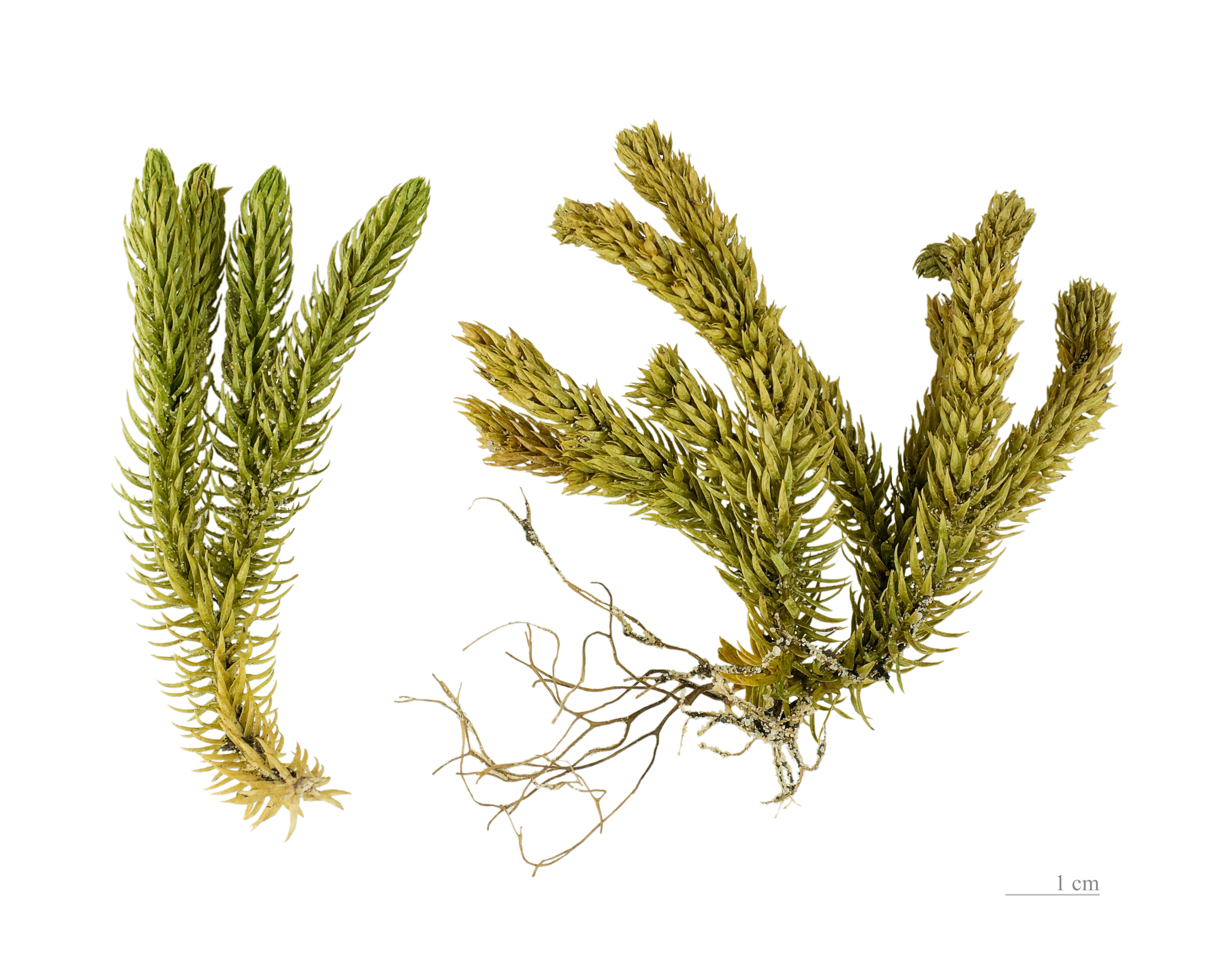
Huperzia selago

Huperzia selago, the northern firmoss or fir clubmoss, is a vascular plant in the family Lycopodiaceae. It is small-ish, sturdy, stiff and upright and densely scale-leaved. This plant is an evergreen, perennial pteridophyte. The spores are produced June to September (in the northern hemisphere). It has a circumpolar distribution.

== Taxonomy ==
It was first described in 1753 by Carl Linnaeus as Lycopodium selago, and in 1829 it was reassigned to the genus Huperzia by Johann Jakob Bernhardi.

== Description ==
The dichotomous stalk of the plant is 5–20 cm (2.0–7.9 in) with the branches being of same length with one another. The leaves are densely spiral, flat and needle-like, 4–8 mm long. The sporangium are at the base of the leaves of the shoot's top. There are often bulbils in the leaf axils.

== Distribution and habitat ==
It is a circumpolar plant, found in the northern parts of North America, Europe, and Asia. It is found in sandy pits, ditches, along lakeshores, heathland and in conifer swamps. In the northeastern United States, it is found in boreal habitat, but not alpine zones.

In Europe, its range extends from Svalbard to the mountains of northern Spain and Italy, and from the British Isles east through central Asia to the Kamchatka peninsula, Japan, the Aleutian Islands, North America, Greenland, Iceland, and the Faroe Islands.

== Traditional uses ==
This organism contains strong acetylcholinesterase inhibitors.

"Upper Tanana Indians used the whole plant in a poultice applied to the head for headaches".

In Finnish traditional medicine this plant has been used as a remedy against rickets and as an emetic and botanical insecticide.
