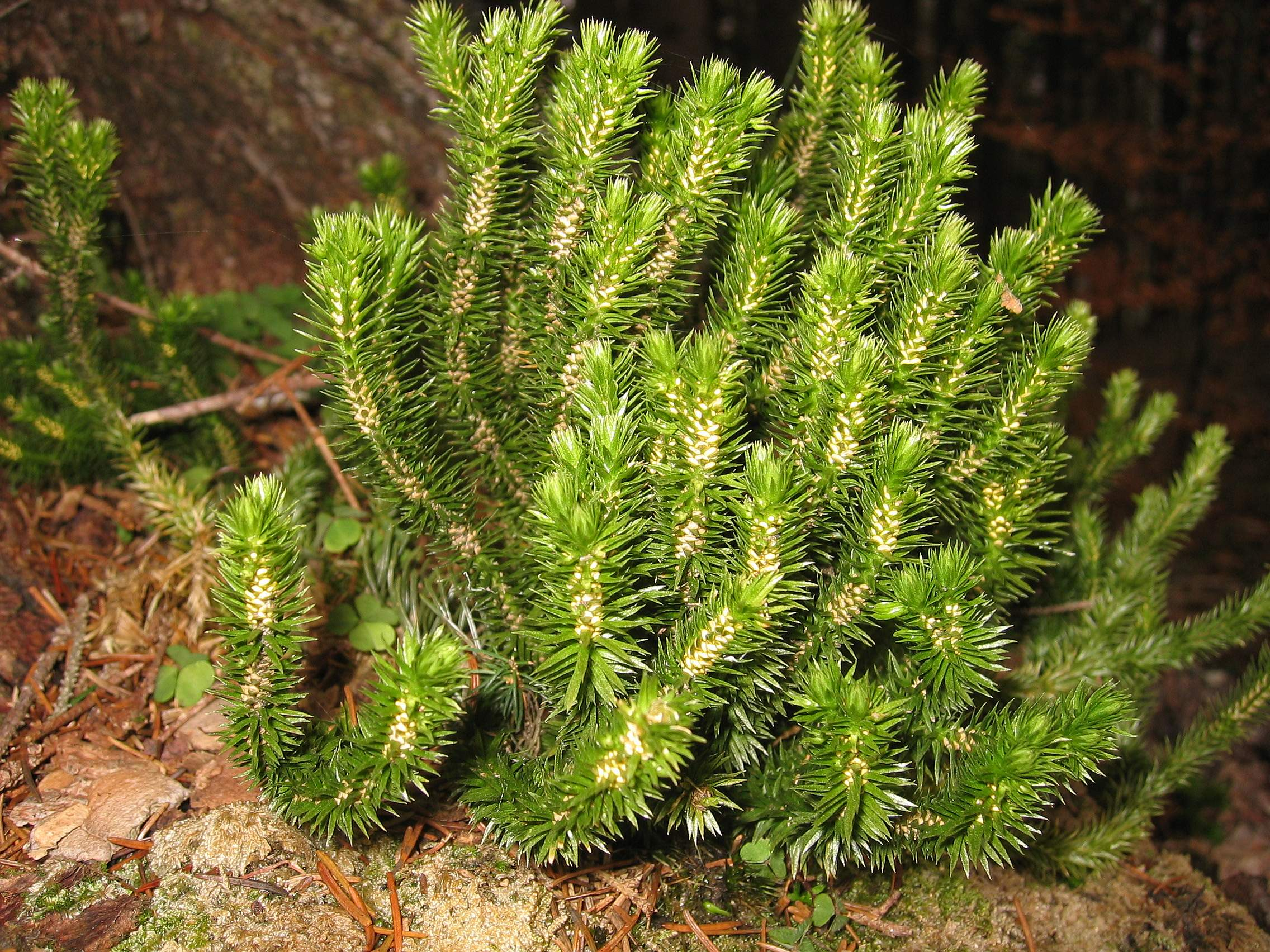
- Huperzia selago in Austria

Scientific classification
- Kingdom: Plantae
- Clade: Tracheophytes
- Clade: Lycophytes
- Class: Lycopodiopsida
- Order: Lycopodiales
- Family: Lycopodiaceae
- Subfamily: Huperzioideae
- Genus: Huperzia; Bernh.

Species
- See text.

= Huperzia =

Genus of vascular plants

Huperzia is a genus of lycophyte plants, sometimes known as the firmosses or fir clubmosses; the Flora of North America calls them gemma fir-mosses. This genus was originally included in the related genus Lycopodium, from which it differs in having undifferentiated sporangial leaves, and the sporangia not formed into apical cones. The common name firmoss, used for some of the north temperate species, refers to their superficial resemblance to branches of fir (Abies), a conifer. As of 2020, two very different circumscriptions of the genus were in use. In the Pteridophyte Phylogeny Group classification of 2016 (PPG I), Huperzia is one of three genera in the subfamily Huperzioideae of the family Lycopodiaceae. Most species in the subfamily are placed in the genus Phlegmariurus. Huperzia is left with about 25 species, although not all have been formally transferred to other genera. Other sources recognize only Huperzia, which then has about 340 species.

== Morphology ==
The sporophytes of this genus have unbranched shoots that are generally upright and round in cross section. Horizontal stems are absent. The leaves are not borne in distinct ranks, and are usually somewhat lanceolate in shape. In some species, they vary in size according to the season in which they grow. Branchlets bearing gemmae – bud-like structures by which the plant reproduces asexually – occur among the leaves. The gemmae are triangular, with eight leaves in a constant pattern: four flattened into a plane and two large lateral leaves. The sporangia are kidney-shaped (reniform), occurring at the base of a leaf that is either unmodified or reduced. The roots are produced near the apex of shoots, and migrate downwards inside the cortex of the stem to emerge at soil level. The unbranched gametophytes are not photosynthetic, but rather subterranean and mycorrhizal.

The Flora of North America distinguishes Huperzia from the epiphytic tropical genus Phlegmariurus on the basis of differences such as the former's complex and specialized shoots, the gemmae and the branchlets on which they are borne, and the unbranched gametophytes.

== Taxonomy ==
The genus Huperzia was created by Johann Jakob Bernhardi in 1801. Bernhardi separated Huperzia from Lycopodium. The type species is Lycopodium selago which became Huperzia selago.

In the Pteridophyte Phylogeny Group classification of 2016 (PPG I), Huperzia is placed in the subfamily Huperzioideae of the family Lycopodiaceae. A phylogenetic study in 2016, employing both molecular and morphological data, concluded that either a one-genus or a three-genus division of the subfamily produced monophyletic taxa. The authors preferred the three-genus division, recognizing Huperzia, Phlegmariurus and Phylloglossum. Their preferred hypothesis for the relationships of the three genera was:

- Huperzioideae
  - - Phylloglossum
    - Huperzia
  - Phlegmariurus

The majority of the species formerly placed in a broadly defined Huperzia belong in Phlegmariurus. Earlier, the Flora of North America had also separated Huperzia from Phegmariurus. However, Phlegmariurus is difficult to separate morphologically, and others have preferred the one-genus division of the subfamily.

=== Species ===
The PPG I classification stated there were 25 species in the genus Huperzia. As of June 2024, World Ferns listed the following species, noting that "many species still need transfer into other split genera".

- Huperzia acicularis Björk, provisionally accepted
- Huperzia appalachiana Beitel & Mickel
- Huperzia archboldiana (Nessel) Holub
- Huperzia arunachalensis (D.D.Pant & P.S.Pandey) Fraser-Jenk.
- Huperzia asiatica (Ching) N.Shrestha & X.C.Zhang
- Huperzia australiana (Herter) Holub
- Huperzia beccarii (Alderw.) Holub
- Huperzia beiteliana Mickel
- Huperzia bucahwangensis Ching
- Huperzia campestris (Alderw.) Holub
- Huperzia catharinae (Christ) Holub
- Huperzia ceylanica (Spring) Rothm.
- Huperzia chinensis (Christ) Ching
- Huperzia chishuiensis X.Y.Wang & P.S.Wang
- Huperzia continentalis Testo, A.Haines & A.V.Gilman
- Huperzia crispata (Ching) Ching
- Huperzia delavayi (Christ & Herter) Ching
- Huperzia emeiensis (Ching & H.S.Kung) Ching & H.S.Kung
- Huperzia erosa Beitel & W.H.Wagner
- Huperzia erubescens (Brack.) Holub
- Huperzia europaea Björk, provisionally accepted
- Huperzia everettii (Herter) Holub
- Huperzia fuegiana (Roiv.) Holub
- Huperzia gedeana (Alderw.) Holub
- Huperzia goliathensis (Alderw.) Holub
- Huperzia haleakalae (Brack.) Holub
- Huperzia herteriana (Kümmerle) T.Sen & U.Sen
- Huperzia javanica (Sw.) Fraser-Jenk.
- Huperzia jejuensis B.Y.Sun & J.Lim
- Huperzia kangdingensis (Ching) Ching
- Huperzia kunmingensis Ching
- Huperzia laipoensis Ching
- Huperzia lajouensis Ching
- Huperzia leishanensis X.Y.Wang
- Huperzia liangshanica (H.S.Kung) Ching & H.S.Kung
- Huperzia lucidula (Michx.) Trevis.
- Huperzia medogensis Ching & Y.X.Lin
- Huperzia meghalaica Fraser-Jenk.
- Huperzia miniata (Spring) Trevis.
- Huperzia minima (Herter) Holub
- Huperzia miyoshiana (Makino) Ching
- Huperzia muscicola W.M.Chu
- Huperzia myriophyllifolia (Hayata) Holub
- Huperzia nanchuanensis (Ching & H.S.Kung) Ching & H.S.Kung
- Huperzia nanlingensis Shrestha, F.W.Xing, X.P.Qi, Y.H.Yan & X.C.Zhang
- Huperzia occidentalis (Clute) Kartesz & Gandhi
- Huperzia porophila (F.E.Lloyd & Underw.) Holub
- Huperzia quasipolytrichoides (Hayata) Ching
- Huperzia rubicaulis S.K.Wu & X.Cheng
- Huperzia saururoides (Bory & D'Urv.) Rothm.
- Huperzia selago (L.) Bernh. (including H. selago subsp. appressa - Appalachian firmoss)
- Huperzia serrata (Thunb.) Trevis.
- Huperzia shresthae Fraser-Jenk.
- Huperzia somae (Hayata) Ching
- Huperzia sprengeri (Nessel) Holub
- Huperzia suberecta (Lowe) Tardieu
- Huperzia subintegra (Hillebr.) Beitel & W.H.Wagner
- Huperzia sumatrana (Alderw.) Holub
- Huperzia sutchueniana (Herter) Ching
- Huperzia tibetica (Ching) Ching
- Huperzia yakusimensis (Herter) Holub
- Huperzia zollingeri (Herter) Holub

The following hybrids have been described:

- Huperzia × bartleyi (Cusick) Holub
- Huperzia × buttersii (Abbe) Kartesz & Gandhi
- Huperzia × carlquistii Beitel & W.H.Wagner
- Huperzia × gillettii Beitel & W.H.Wagner
- Huperzia × josephbeitelii A.Haines
- Huperzia × medeirosii Beitel & W.H.Wagner
- Huperzia × protoporophila A.Haines
- Huperzia × sulcinervia (Spring) Trevis.

== Distribution and habitat ==
As circumscribed in the PPG I classification, Huperzia is distributed in temperate, arctic and alpine habitats, including mountains in tropical Asia. Its species are terrestrial or grow on rocks. Phlegmariurus is epiphytic, and has a worldwide tropical distribution, so when Huperzia is defined broadly to include all three genera of the subfamily Huperzioideae, it has an almost worldwide distribution, absent mainly in North Africa, the Arabian Peninsula and Western Asia.
