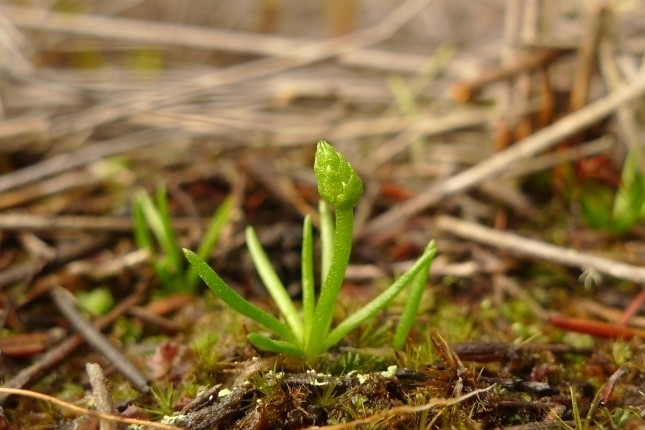

Scientific classification
- Kingdom: Plantae
- Clade: Embryophytes
- Clade: Tracheophytes
- Clade: Lycophytes
- Class: Lycopodiopsida
- Order: Lycopodiales
- Family: Lycopodiaceae
- Subfamily: Huperzioideae
- Genus: Phylloglossum; Kunze 1843
- Species: P. drummondii

Binomial name
- Phylloglossum drummondii Kunze 1843

Synonyms
- Huperzia drummondii (Kunze1843) Christenhusz 2011; Lycopodium sanguisorba Spring 1848

= Phylloglossum =

Genus of spore-bearing plants

Phylloglossum, a genus in the clubmoss family Lycopodiaceae, is a small plant superficially resembling a tiny grass plant, growing with a rosette of slender leaves 2–5 cm long from an underground bulb-like root. It has a single central stem up to 5 cm tall bearing a spore-producing cone at the apex, and was previously classified variously in the family Lycopodiaceae or in its own family the Phylloglossaceae, but recent genetic evidence demonstrates it is most closely related to the genus Huperzia and is a sister clade to the genus Phlegmariurus, which was formerly included in Huperzia.

Morphological characters, as well as molecular characters based on rbcL data, support the close relationship of Phylloglossum to Huperzia. Similarities in spore morphology, sporangial epidermis morphology, phytochemistry, and chromosome number indicate that Phylloglossum and Huperzia are closely related.

A morphological character that complicates this is the presence of a perenniating tuber in Phylloglossum, which has, in the past, misled scientists to place it more closely to the genus Lycopodiella. Phylloglossum is unique within Lycopodiaceae due to this underground perenniating tuber, which is a reduced stem system that has developed to be considered a new organ. This tuber is an adaptation to the dry season which allows the plant to survive in a dormant state, and the species is the only wholly deciduous Lycopodiaceae which regenerates from tubers.

Its gametophyte is non-photosynthetic at first, getting its nutrients from mycorrhiza, but develops a photosynthetic crown as it matures.

The only species, Phylloglossum drummondii (pygmy clubmoss), is a native of Australia (southwestern Western Australia, southern South Australia, Victoria and Tasmania) and New Zealand (North Island).

== Gallery ==
Phylloglossum drummondii. The dashed line is the ground level

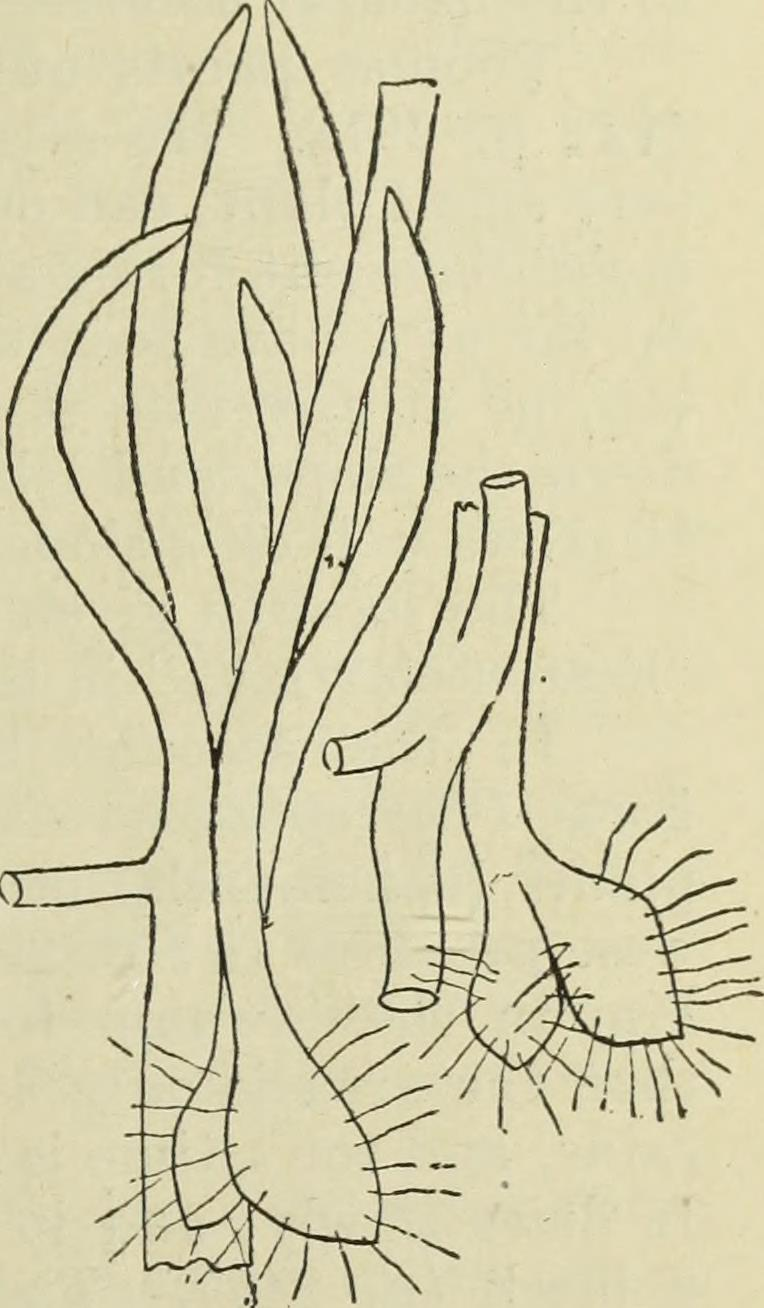
Fertile plant producing two new tubers in one growing season by bifurcation of the distal end of the tuber stalk

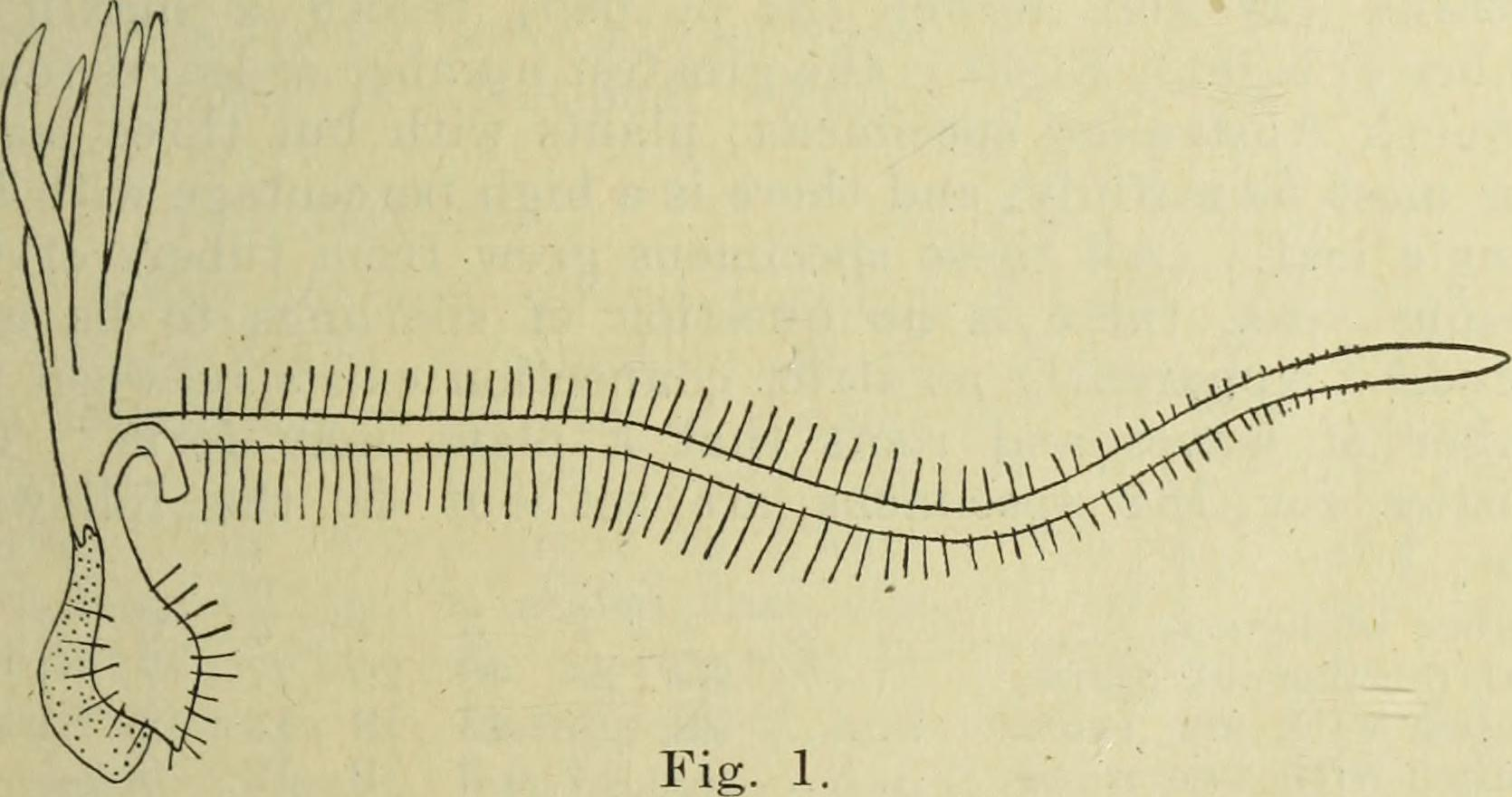
Six-leaved plant with two roots, the full length of one of which is shown in its natural position. The very numerous root hairs are merely indicated diagrammatically as are the hairs on the new tuber
