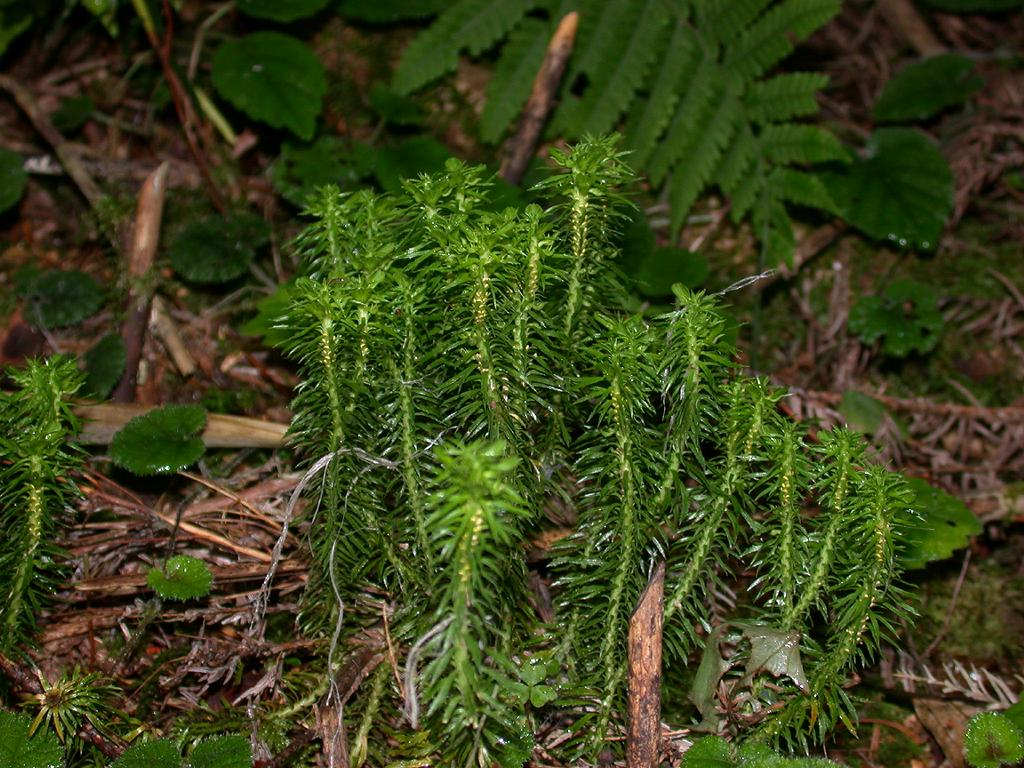

Conservation status
- Least Concern (IUCN 3.1)

- Secure (NatureServe)

Scientific classification
- Kingdom: Plantae
- Clade: Tracheophytes
- Clade: Lycophytes
- Class: Lycopodiopsida
- Order: Lycopodiales
- Family: Lycopodiaceae
- Genus: Huperzia
- Species: H. serrata

Binomial name
- Huperzia serrata (Thunb. ex Murray) Trevis.

Synonyms
- Lycopodium serratum Thunb.; Urostachys serratus (Thunb.) Herter; Huperzia selago ssp. serrata (Thunb.) Á. Löve & D. Löve; Huperzia serrata var. serrata (Thunb.) Trevis.

= Huperzia serrata =

Species of spore-bearing plant

Huperzia serrata, the toothed clubmoss, is a plant known as a firmoss. The species is native to eastern Asia (China, Tibet, Japan, the Korean peninsula, the Russian Far East). It is also found in the main islands of Hawaii with the exception of Maui, but is considered vulnerable by NatureServe.
