= Scale leaf =

Plant anatomical structure

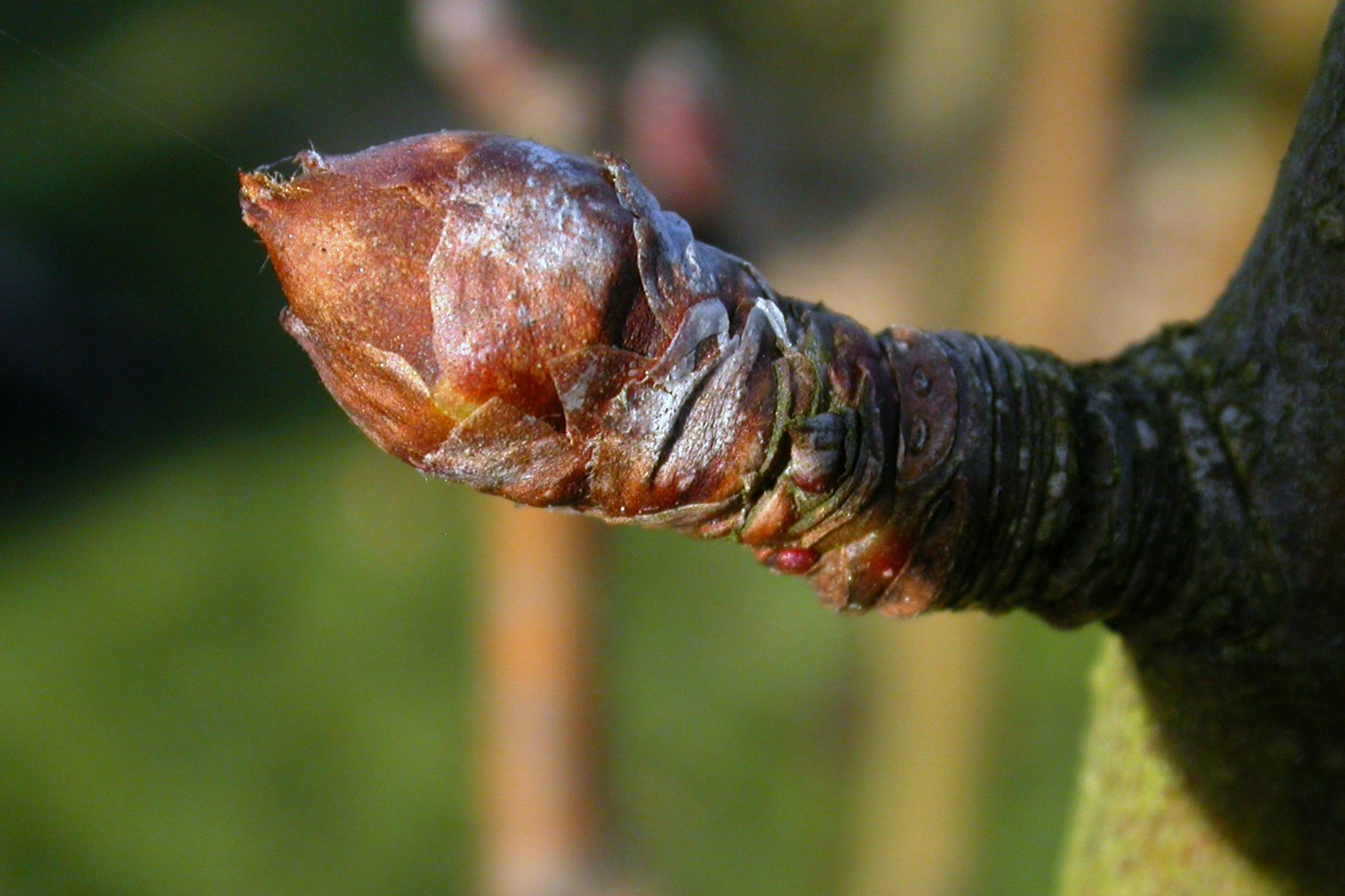
Scale leaves on the bud of a pear tree

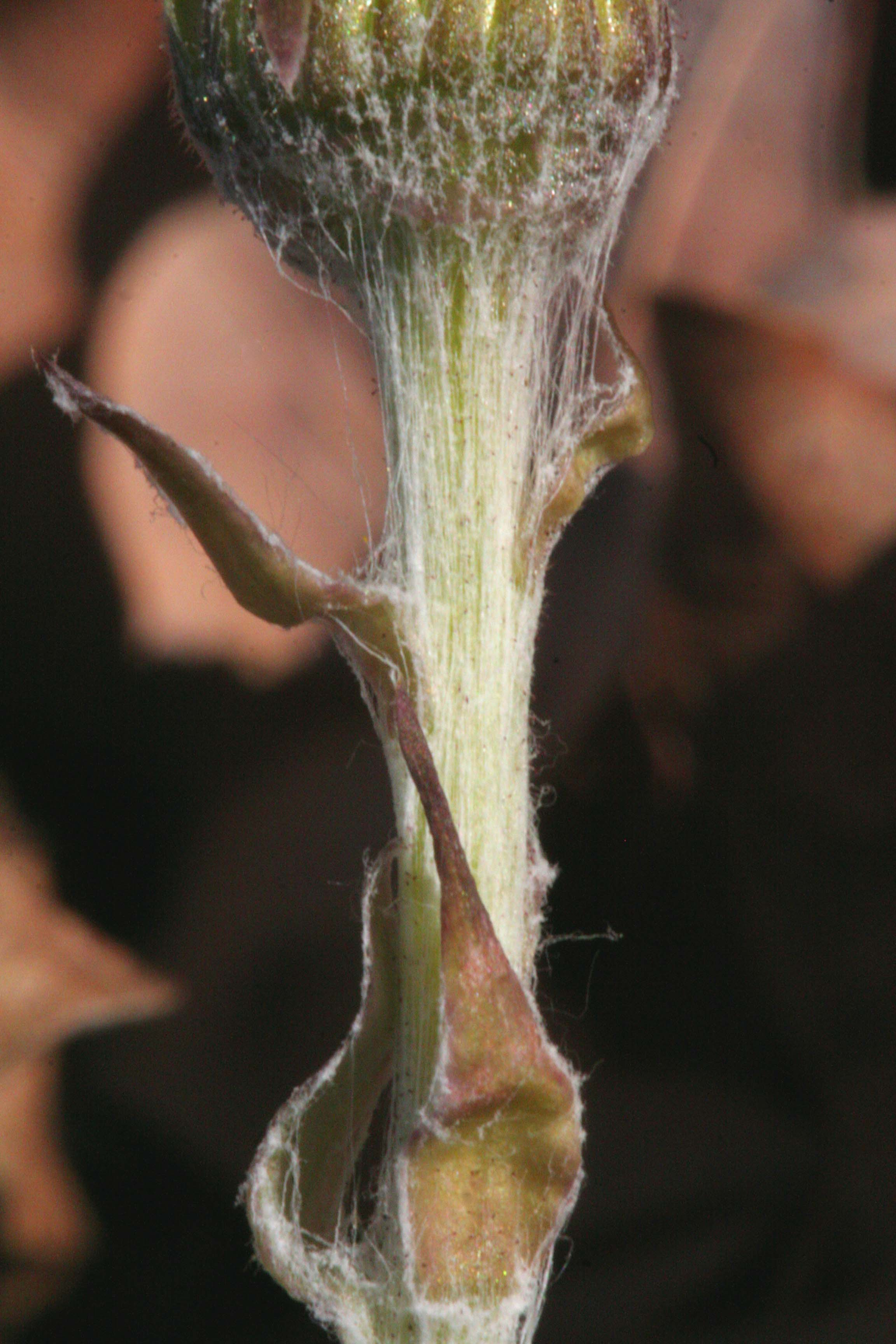
Scale leaves on the caulis of a Tussilago

A scale leaf is a leaf with a reduced blade which is mainly formed by the amphigastrium. It can be dry, membranous or coriaceous, but also sometimes green.

Scale leaves protect with their bud scales the leaves and flowers inside the bud from drying out in winter. In some species the scale leaves are additionally covered with a sticky layer of wax.

Green scale leaves can be found for example on the caulis of Tussilago. They can also be found on plants growing in drier habitats, for example Haloxylon ammodendron, the saxaul.

== Literature ==
- Eckehart J. Jäger: Rothmaler Exkursionsflora von Deutschland. Gefäßpflanzen: Grundband. Spektrum, Heidelberg 2011, ISBN 978-3-8274-1606-3, p. 893.
- Peter Sitte, Hubert Ziegler, Friedrich Ehrendorfer, Andreas Bresinsky: Strasburger, Lehrbuch der Botanik. Gustav Fischer, Stuttgart, Jena, New York 1991, ISBN 3-437-20447-5, p. 214–215.
