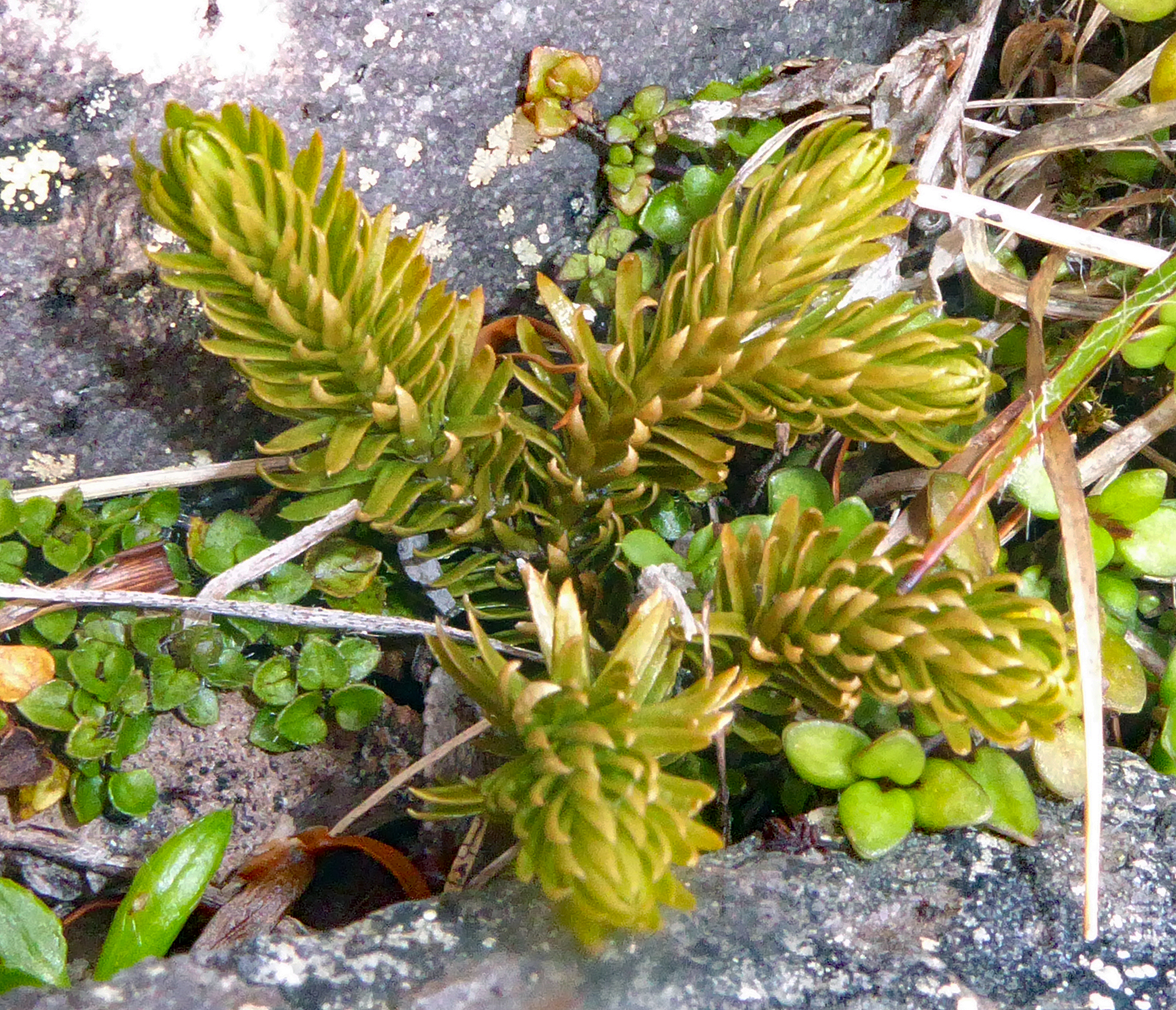

Scientific classification
- Kingdom: Plantae
- Clade: Tracheophytes
- Clade: Lycophytes
- Class: Lycopodiopsida
- Order: Lycopodiales
- Family: Lycopodiaceae
- Genus: Huperzia
- Species: H. australiana

Binomial name
- Huperzia australiana (Herter) Holub

Synonyms
- Lycopodium australianum Herter

= Huperzia australiana =

Species of spore-bearing plant

Huperzia australiana is a species of small terrestrial plant, a firmoss, in the Lycopodiaceae (clubmoss) family. It is native to Australia and New Zealand.

== Distribution and habitat ==
The plant occurs at sheltered sites in subalpine and subantarctic regions, in grasslands and around bogs, up to 2000 m above sea level.

== Description ==
Huperzia australiana has decumbent stems with densely tufted, erect branches up to 300 mm long, usually branched 2 or 3 times. The leaves are crowded, appressed to spreading, 5–9 mm long, 0.5–1.5 mm wide in the middle and tapering to a point. It reproduces vegetatively through the often numerous small bulbils which form along the stem. The sporophylls are similar to the foliage leaves; no strobili are formed; the bright yellow, kidney-shaped sporangia are produced in the upper leaf axils.
