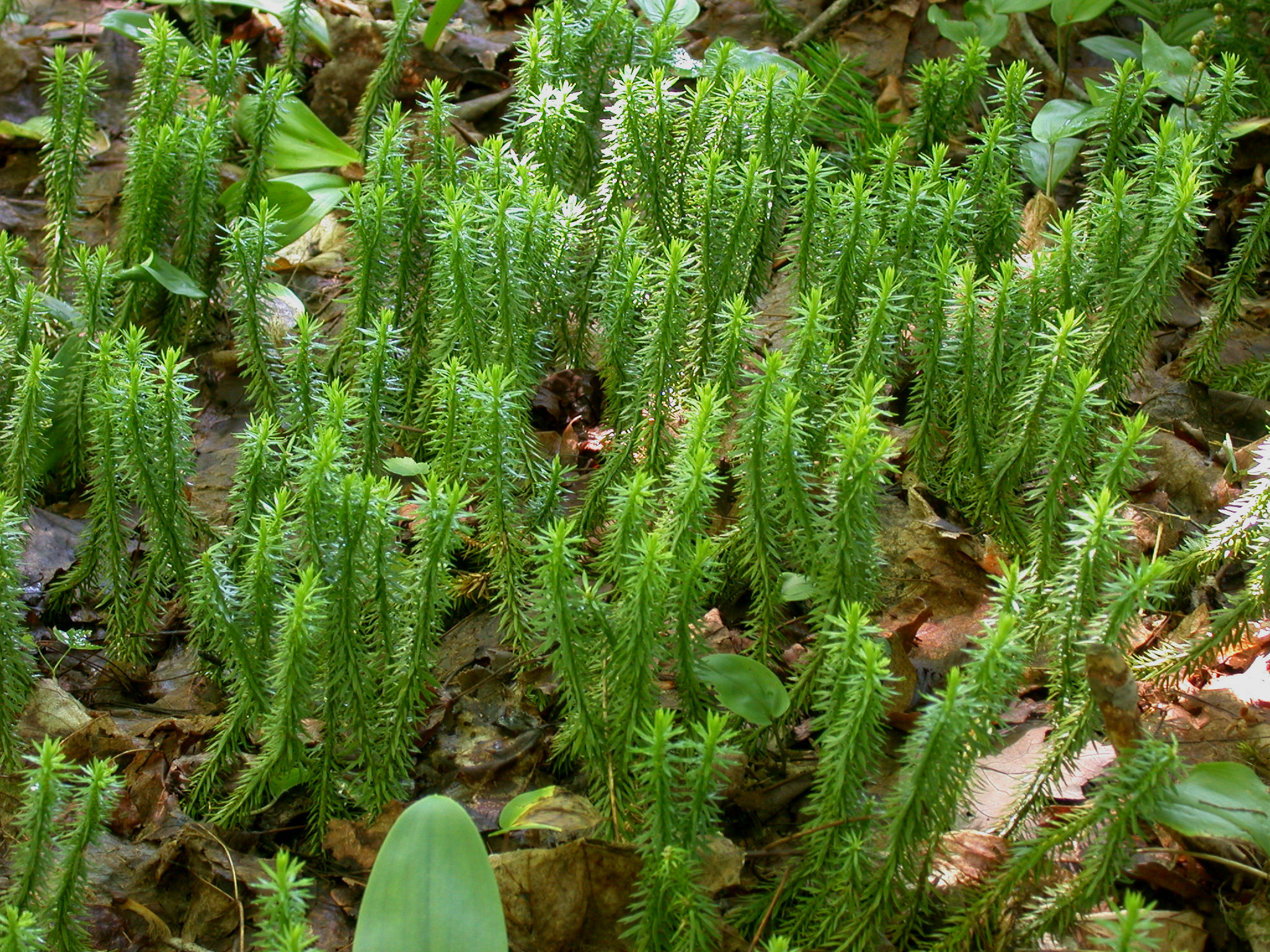

Conservation status
- Secure (NatureServe)

Scientific classification
- Kingdom: Plantae
- Clade: Tracheophytes
- Clade: Lycophytes
- Class: Lycopodiopsida
- Order: Lycopodiales
- Family: Lycopodiaceae
- Genus: Huperzia
- Species: H. lucidula

Binomial name
- Huperzia lucidula (Michaux) Trevisan

Synonyms
- Lycopodium lucidulum Michx.

= Huperzia lucidula =

Shining firmoss

Species of spore-bearing plant

Huperzia lucidula (also called the shining firmoss or shining clubmoss) is a bright, evergreen, rhizomatous clubmoss of the genus Huperzia.

They grow in loose tufts 14–20 cm long, occasionally up to 1 m long. The leaves are 7–11 mm long (shorter, 3–6 mm, at annual nodes) and narrow, lance-shaped, shiny, and evergreen. The edges are irregularly “toothed” with small serrations. The sporangia (spore cases) are nestled in the bases of the upper leaves. The roots of this plant grow from a creeping and branching underground rhizome.

The shining firmoss is found in Canada from Manitoba in the west and east to Newfoundland; south into the United States, along the Eastern Seaboard to South Carolina, and west through to Missouri. Its preferred habitat is mainly rich, acidic soils in cool, moist coniferous or mixed hardwood forests, as well as near bogs, above stream banks, and on sheltered, low hillsides. They occasionally grow on moss-lined cliffs and ledges, or on shaded, acidic sandstone outcroppings.

The specific name lucidula comes from Latin and means "shining". This is in clear reference to the plant’s bright, vivid green color.

Reproduction is either by copious spore production from sporangia (at the base of stem leaves) or vegetatively through the spread of gemmae.

== Gallery ==
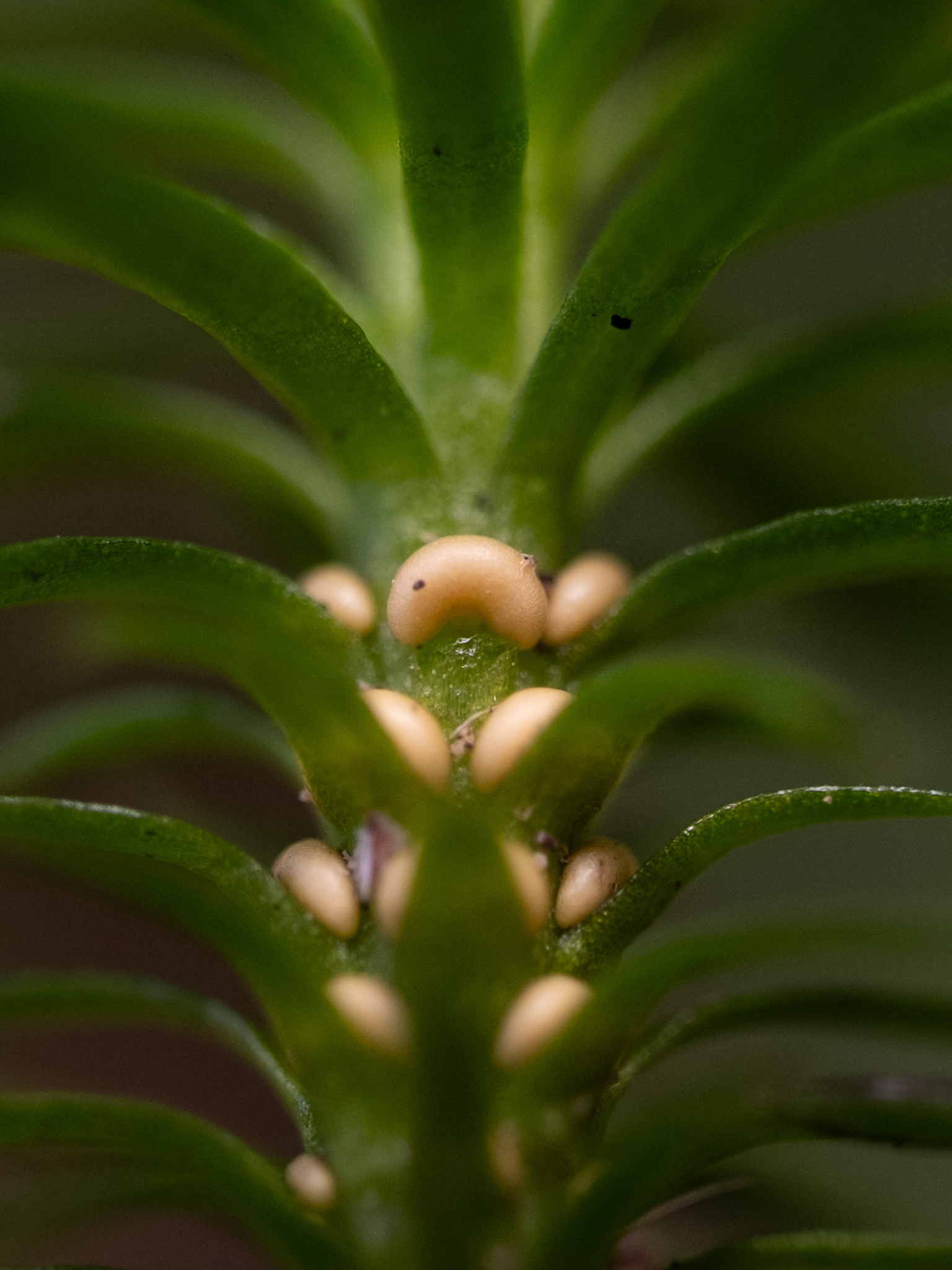
Microphyls and sporangia, from specimen in Shenandoah National Park, Virginia, United States

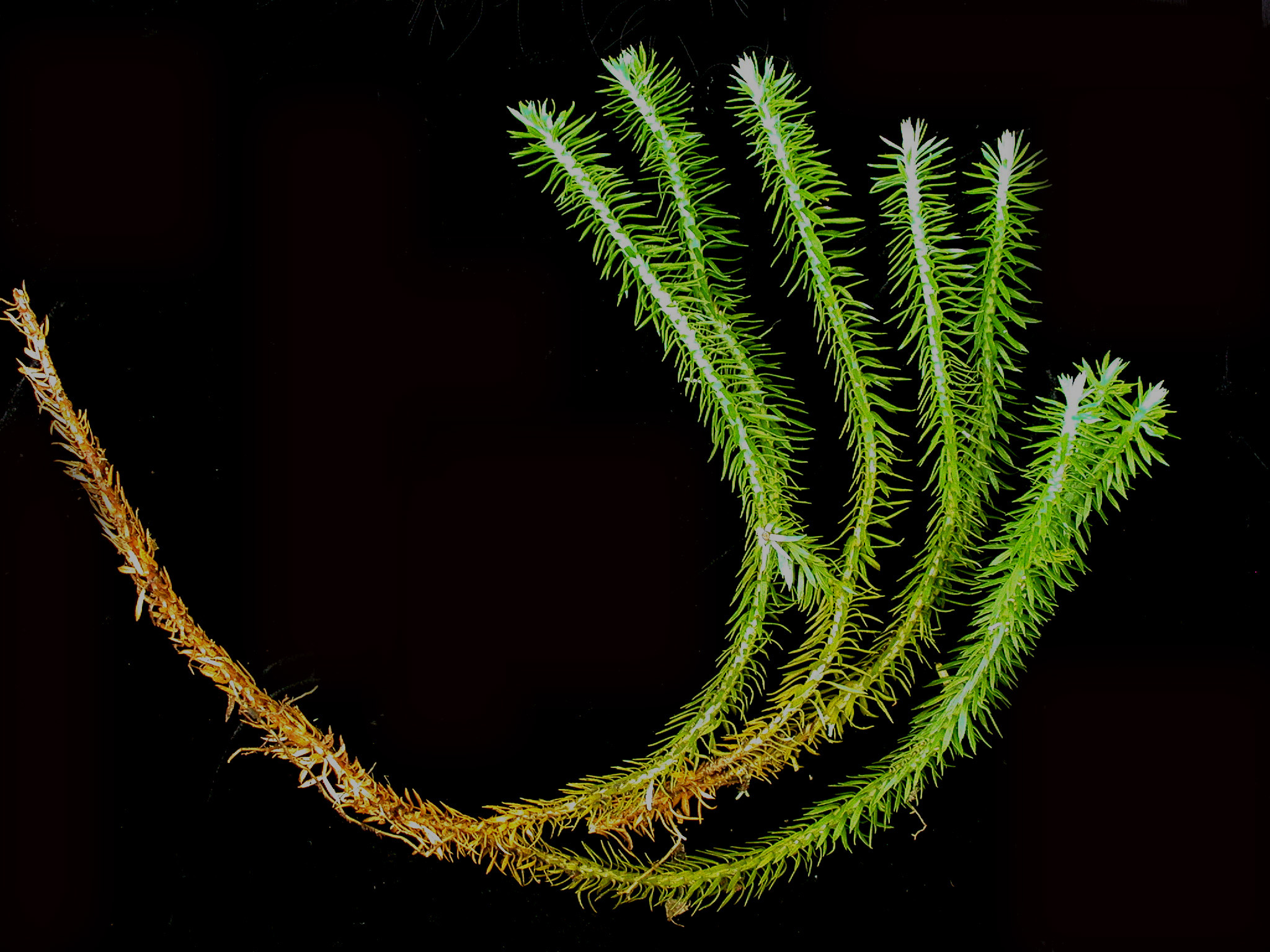
Roots, stolon, shoots, and leaves of the shining clubmoss.

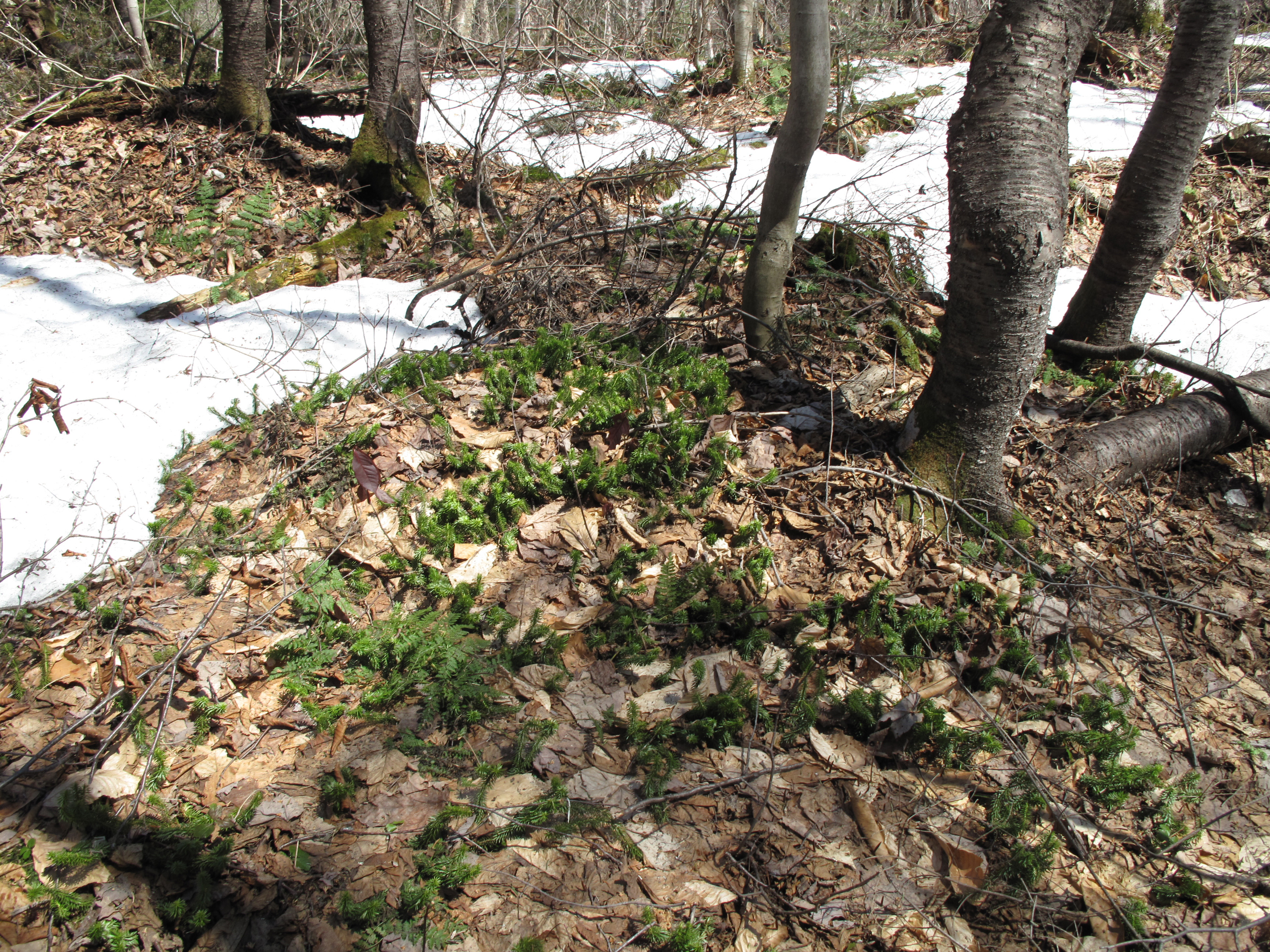
Shining clubmoss plants, after the snowmelt, in their natural habitat.

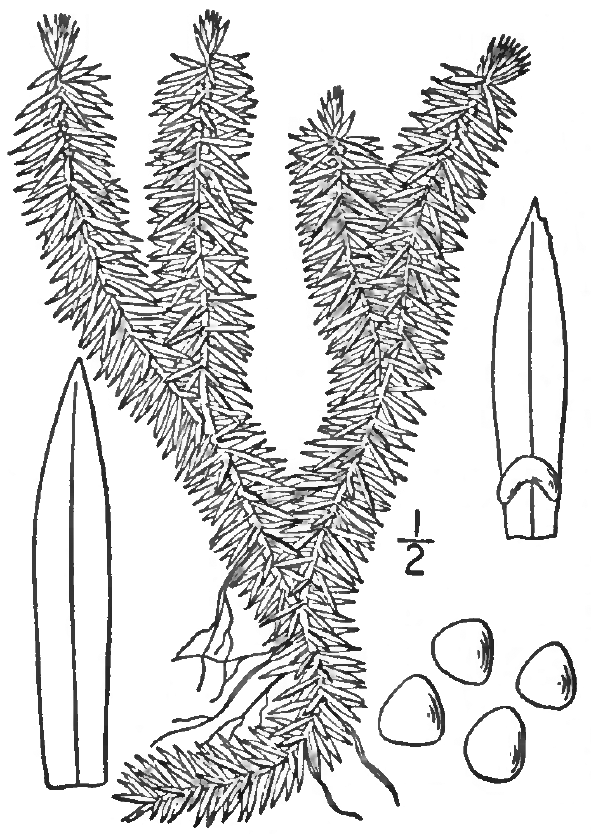
Lycopodium lucidulum (synonym for Huperzia lucidulum) from the second edition of An Illustrated Flora of the Northern United States, Canada and the British Possessions (New York, 1913)

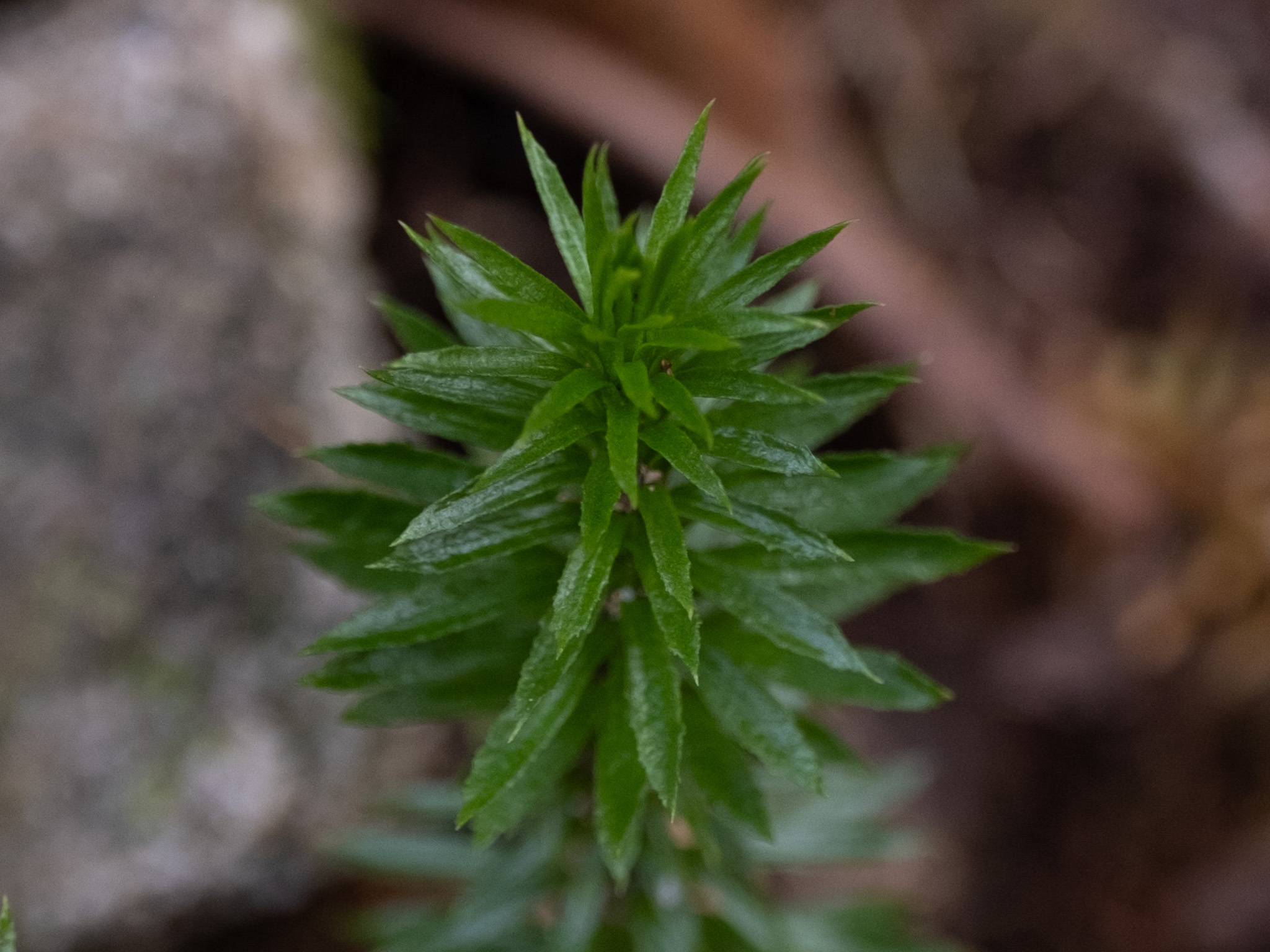
