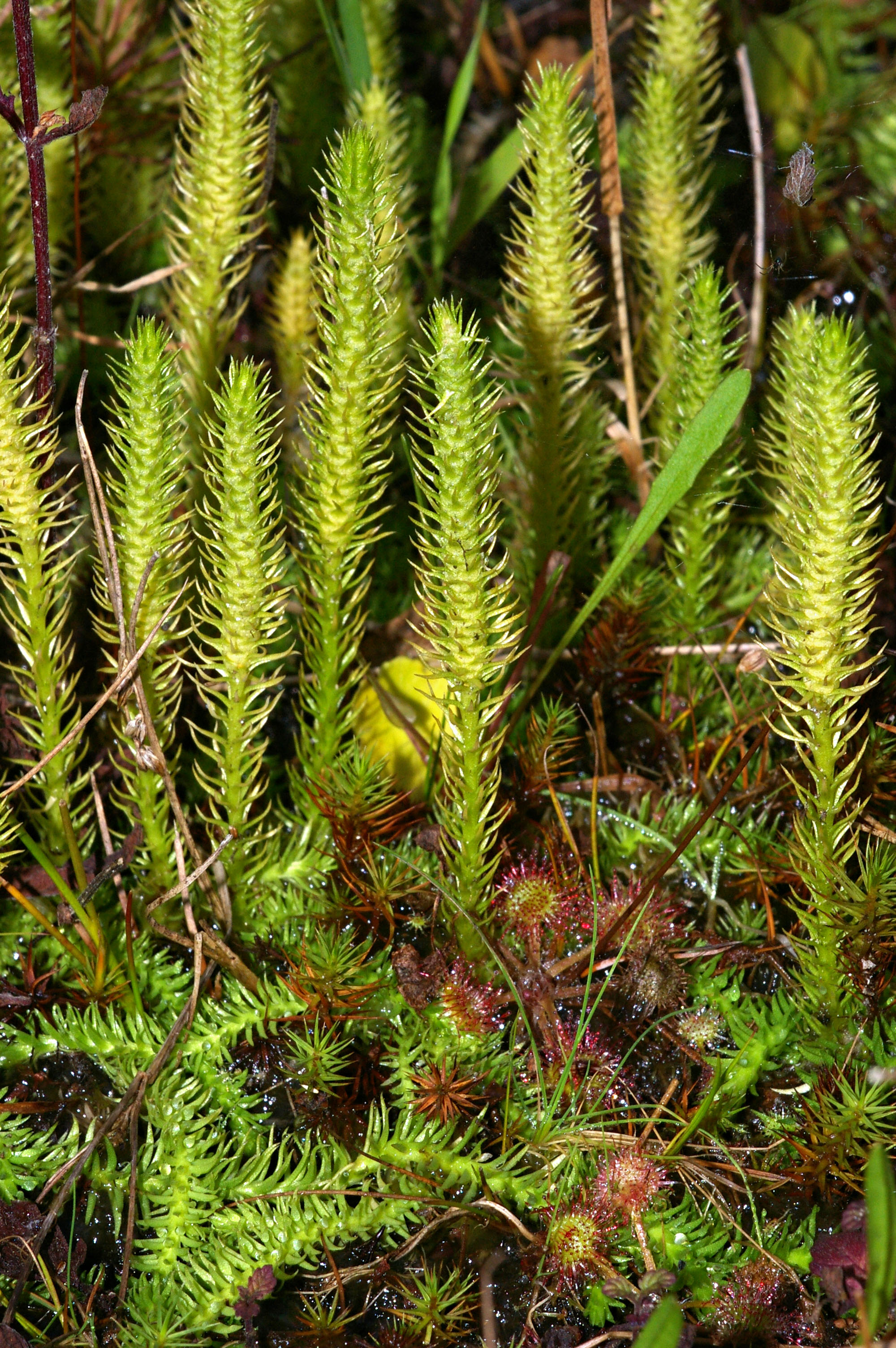
- Lycopodiella inundata

Scientific classification
- Kingdom: Plantae
- Clade: Tracheophytes
- Clade: Lycophytes
- Class: Lycopodiopsida
- Order: Lycopodiales
- Family: Lycopodiaceae
- Subfamily: Lycopodielloideae; W.H.Wagner & Beitel ex B.Øllg.

Genera
- See text

Synonyms
- Lycopodiella Holub sensu Øllgaard (1987)

= Lycopodielloideae =

Subfamily of plants

Lycopodielloideae is a subfamily in the family Lycopodiaceae in the Pteridophyte Phylogeny Group classification of 2016 (PPG I). It is equivalent to a broad circumscription of the genus Lycopodiella in other classifications. Like all lycophytes, members of the Lycopodielloideae are vascular plants that reproduce by spores.

== Description ==
The sporophytes of Lycopodielloideae species are relatively short herbaceous plants. They have stems with pseudomonopodial branching in which unequal binary branching produces the appearance of a main stem with secondary side branches. The main stems are indeterminate and of various forms, including rhizomatous, creeping and upright. The branches are usually determinate (i.e. of limited growth and extension). Sporangia are borne at the bases or in the axils of special spore-bearing leaves (sporophylls), which are notably different from the normal leaves, and are grouped into compact terminal structures (strobili). The strobili may be either upright or drooping.

== Taxonomy ==
The family Lycopodiaceae was first established in 1802. Although other genera now placed within the family (in particular Huperzia, published in 1801) had been described, until the mid-1900s, Lycopodium was often the only genus recognized. Work by Josef Holub and Benjamin Øllgaard in the 1980s established three clear divisions within the family. This has since been supported by molecular phylogenetic studies. Several different ways of representing this situation taxonomically have been used, and are still in use as of 2019, including three subfamilies with multiple genera, and three genera with multiple subgeneric divisions. Three subfamilies, including Lycopodielloideae, were first suggested by Warren Wagner Jr. and Joseph Beitel in 1992, but were not validly published under the International Code of Botanical Nomenclature as it was then. The names were validated by Benjamin Øllgaard in 2015. The entire subfamily Lycopodielloideae in the Pteridophyte Phylogeny Group classification of 2016 (PPG I) corresponds to the single genus Lycopodiella in other classifications.

=== Phylogeny ===
Within the family Lycopodiaceae, there is support for three subgroups. In 2016, Field et al. proposed that the primary division is between Lycopodielloideae plus Lycopodioideae (which comprised their Lycopodioideae) and Huperzioideae (subfamilies sensu PPG I).

- Lycopodiaceae
  - - Lycopodielloideae (Lycopodiella s.l.)
    - Lycopodioideae (Lycopodium s.l.)
  - Huperzioideae (Huperzia s.l.)

Field et al. (2016) included eight species of Lycopodielloideae in their analysis, which suggested the relationships among the genera shown in the following cladogram, where the number of species included in the study is shown in parentheses:

- Lycopodielloideae
  - Lycopodiella (2 spp.)
  - - Pseudolycopodiella (1 sp.)
    - - Lateristachys (1 sp.)
      - Palhinhaea (4 spp.)

=== Genera ===
In the Pteridophyte Phylogeny Group classification of 2016 (PPG I), the Lycopodielloideae comprises the following genera:

- Lateristachys Holub
- Lycopodiella Holub
- Palhinhaea Franco & Vasc.
- Pseudolycopodiella Holub

All of these genera are submerged into a single genus Lycopodiella sensu lato in other systems of classification.

Some species of Lycopodielloideae

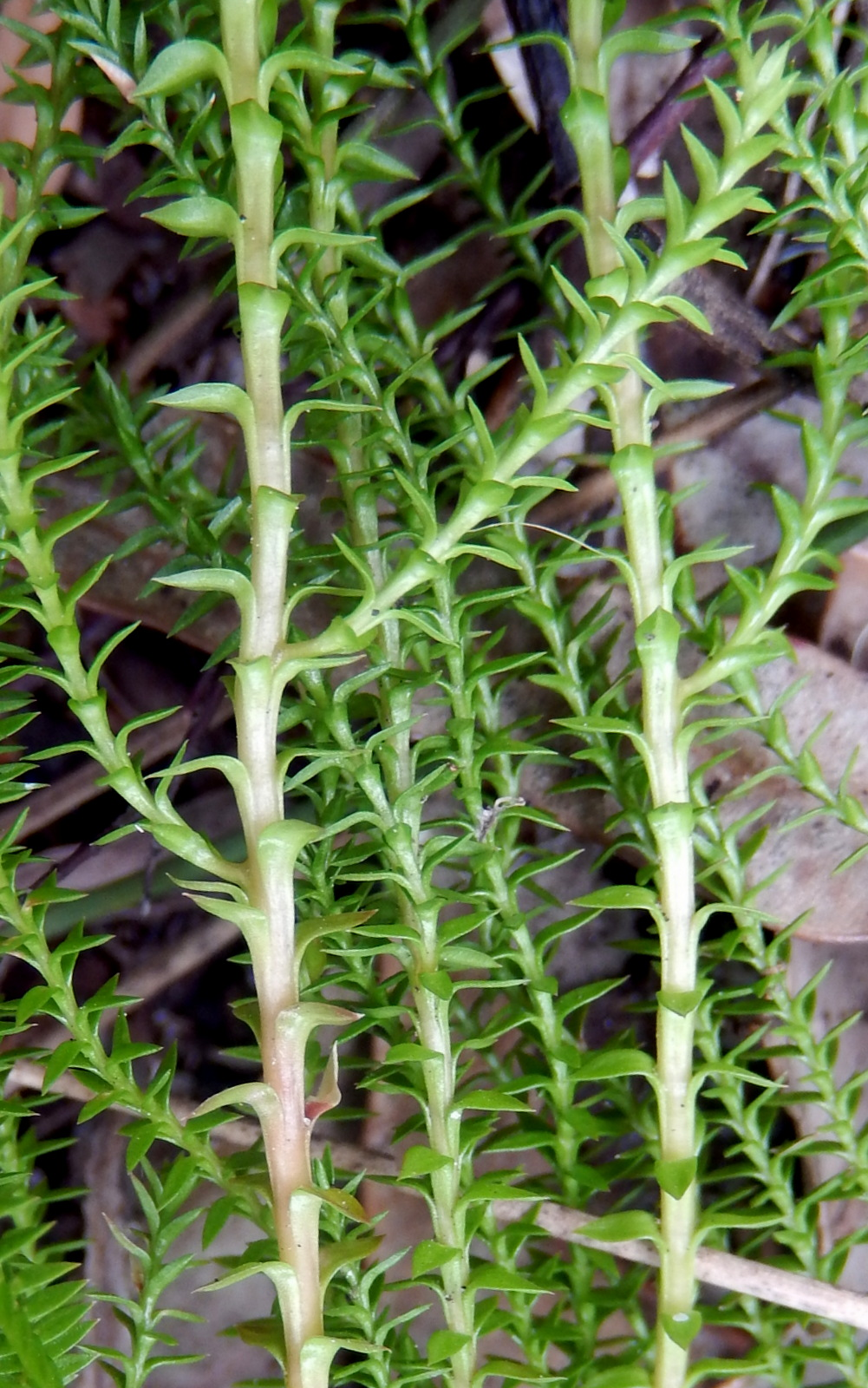
Lateristachys lateralis

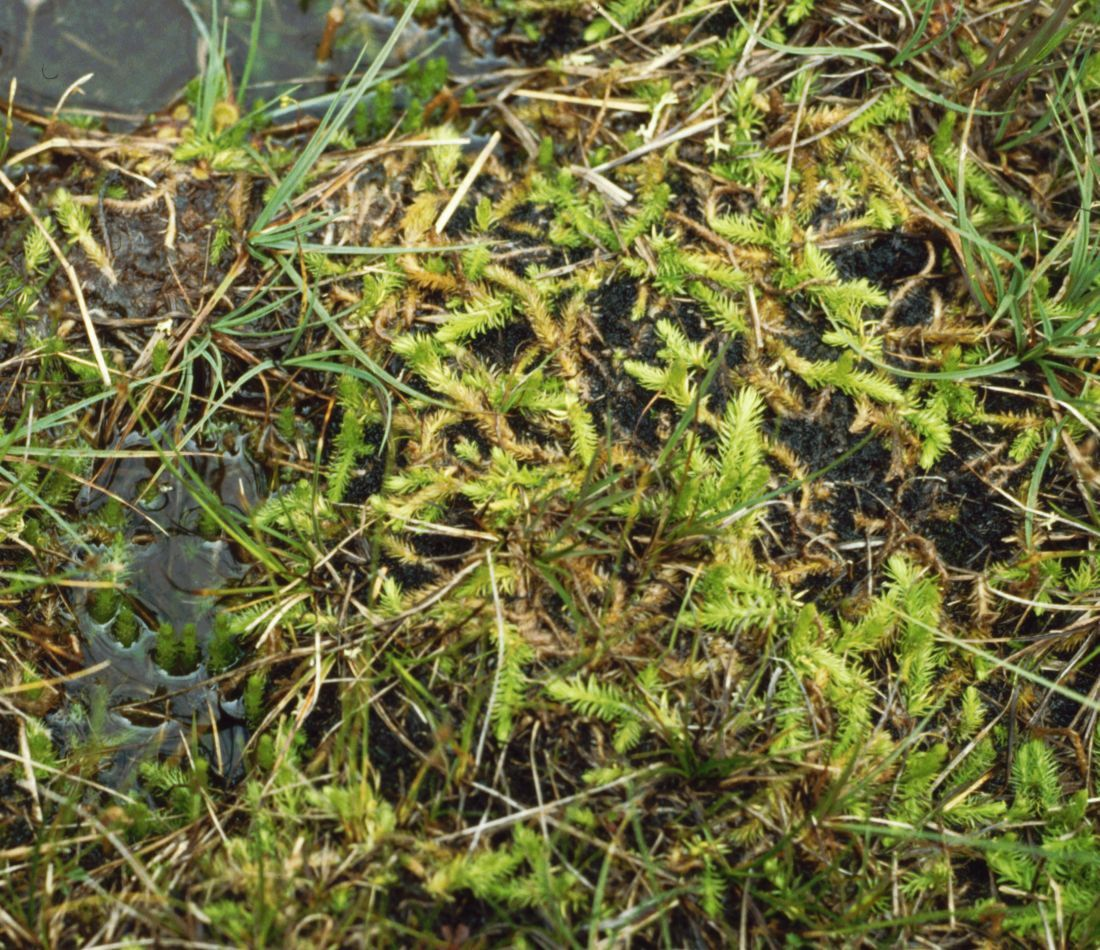
Lycopodiella inundata

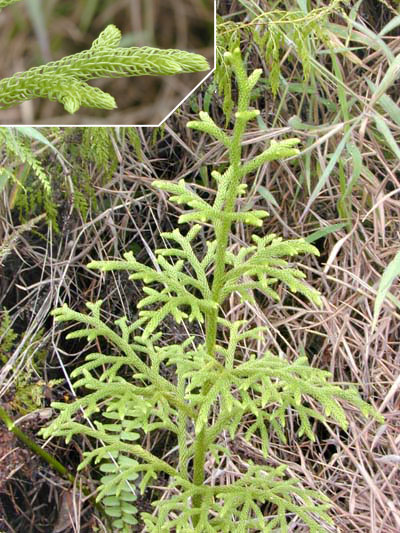
Palhinhaea cernua

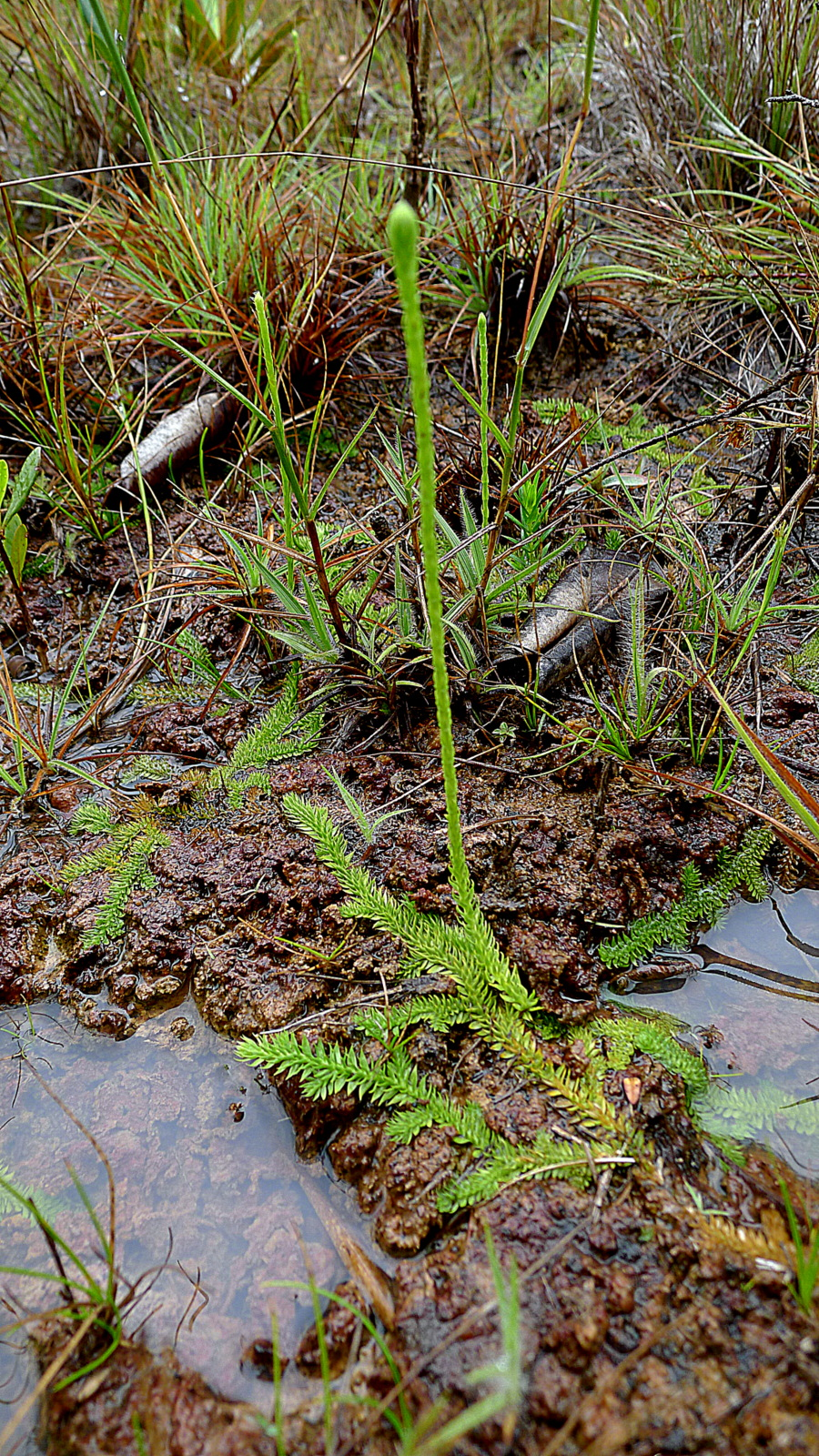
Pseudolycopodiella caroliniana
