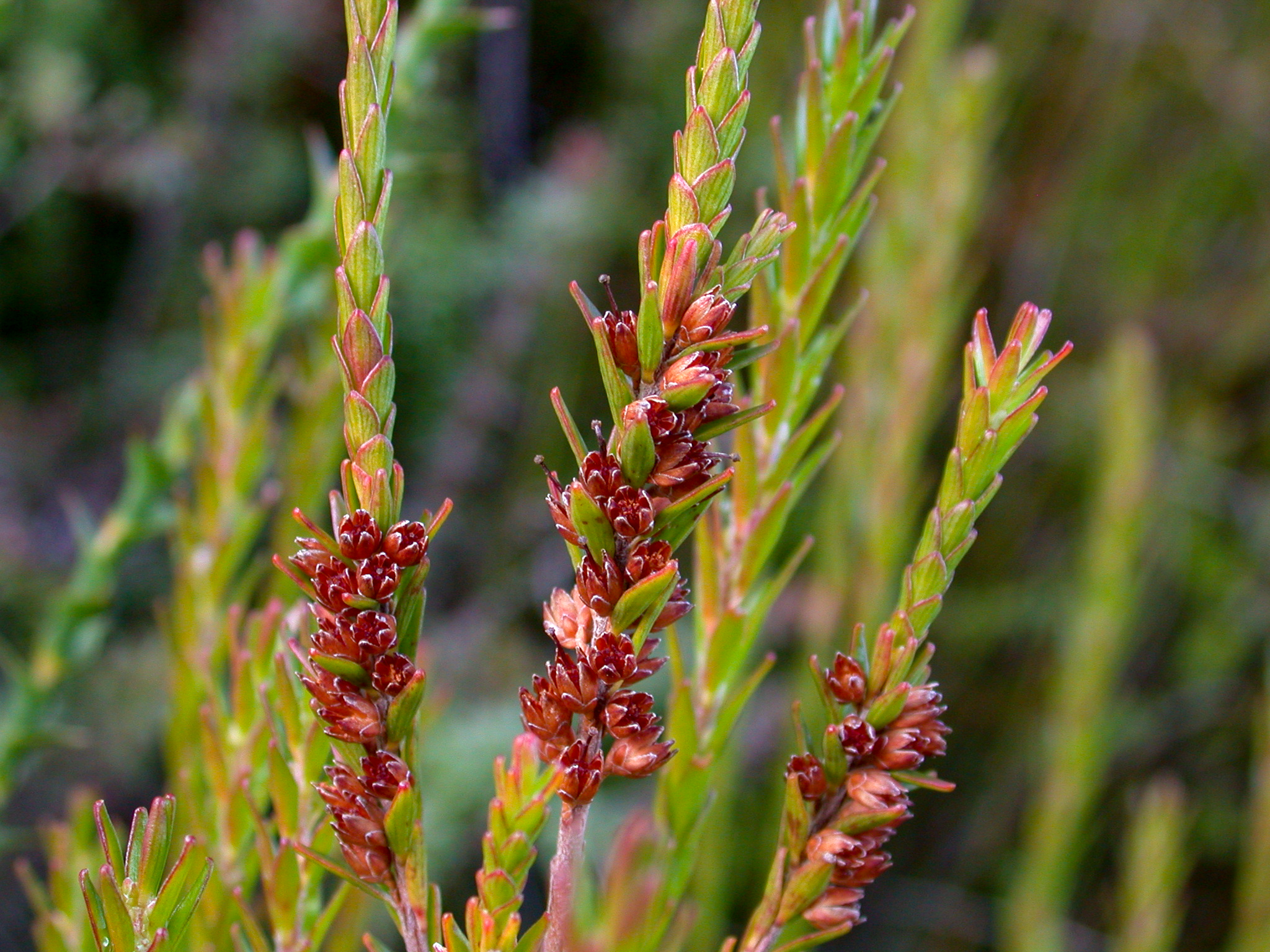
- In Mount Field National Park

Scientific classification
- Kingdom: Plantae
- Clade: Tracheophytes
- Clade: Angiosperms
- Clade: Eudicots
- Clade: Asterids
- Order: Ericales
- Family: Ericaceae
- Genus: Epacris
- Species: E. corymbiflora

Binomial name
- Epacris corymbiflora Hook.f.

= Epacris corymbiflora =

Species of flowering plant

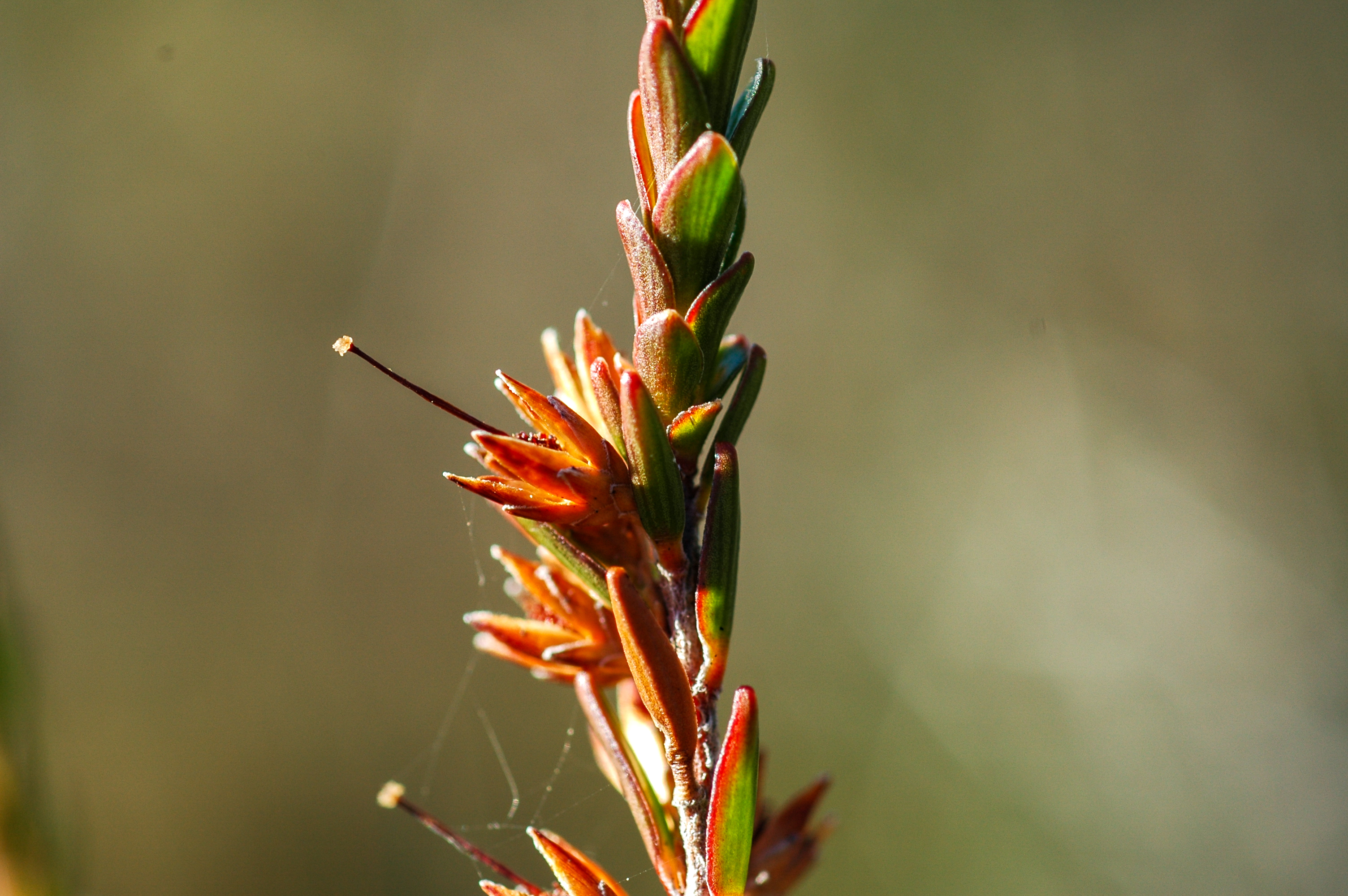
Spent flowers, detail

Epacris corymbiflora is a species of flowering plant in the heath family, Ericaceae, and is endemic to Tasmania. It is a low, spreading shrub with elliptic leaves and white, tube-shaped flowers.

== Description ==
Epacris corymbiflora is a spreading shrub that grows up to 30 cm (12 in) high and 60 cm (24 in) wide. The leaves are crowded, elliptic or diamond-shaped, 3–4 mm (0.12–0.16 in) long with a small point on the tip and the edges curved upwards. Both sides of the leaves are green and there are a few more or less parallel veins. Flowering occurs in summer and the flowers are arranged in dense, more or less spherical groups near the ends of branches, each flower tube-shaped, white and about 5 mm (0.20 in) in diameter.

== Taxonomy and naming ==
Epacris corymbiflora was first formally described in 1857 by Joseph Dalton Hooker in The botany of the Antarctic voyage of H.M. Discovery ships Erebus and Terror. III. Flora Tasmaniae from specimens collected near the Franklin River in Macquarie Harbour by Ronald Campbell Gunn.

== Distribution and habitat ==
This epacris is common in moorland environments and button grass heath in near-coastal areas of Tasmania.
