= Staghorn clubmoss =

Staghorn clubmoss is a common name for several plants and may refer to:

- Palhinhaea cernua
- Lycopodium clavatum
