= Pterostylis aphylla =

Leafless greenhood

Scientific classification
- Kingdom: Plantae
- Clade: Tracheophytes
- Clade: Angiosperms
- Clade: Monocots
- Order: Asparagales
- Family: Orchidaceae
- Subfamily: Orchidoideae
- Tribe: Cranichideae
- Genus: Pterostylis
- Species: P. aphylla

Binomial name
- Pterostylis aphylla Lindl.

Species of orchid endemic to Tasmania

Pterostylis aphylla, commonly known as the leafless greenhood, is a species of orchid endemic to Tasmania. As with similar greenhoods, the flowering plants differ from those which are not flowering. The non-flowering plants have a rosette of leaves flat on the ground but in this species, the flowering plants have a single green and white flower with a brown tip and lack leaves apart from a few small scales.

== Description ==
Pterostylis aphylla is a terrestrial, perennial, deciduous, herb with an underground tuber. Non-flowering plants have a rosette of dark green leaves 4–10 mm (0.2–0.4 in) long and 3–8 mm (0.1–0.3 in) wide. Flowering plants have up to five moderately crowded green and white flowers with a dark brown tip, on a flowering spike, 70–150 mm (3–6 in). The dorsal sepal and petals are fused, forming a hood or "galea" over the column. The dorsal sepal is erect near its base, then curves forward with a short point. The lateral sepals are erect, held closely against the galea with thread-like tips about 3 mm (0.1 in) long that do not project above the galea. The sinus between the bases of the lateral sepals curves inward and has a small notch in the centre. The labellum is about 3 mm (0.1 in) long, 71 mm (3 in) wide, dark brown and not visible outside the intact flower. Flowering occurs from October to March.

== Taxonomy and naming ==
Pterostylis aphylla was first formally described in 1840 by John Lindley from a specimen collected in the north-east of Tasmania and the description was published in The Genera and Species of Orchidaceous Plants.

== Distribution and habitat ==
The leafless greenhood is widespread in Tasmania where it grows in forest, heath and buttongrass moorland.
