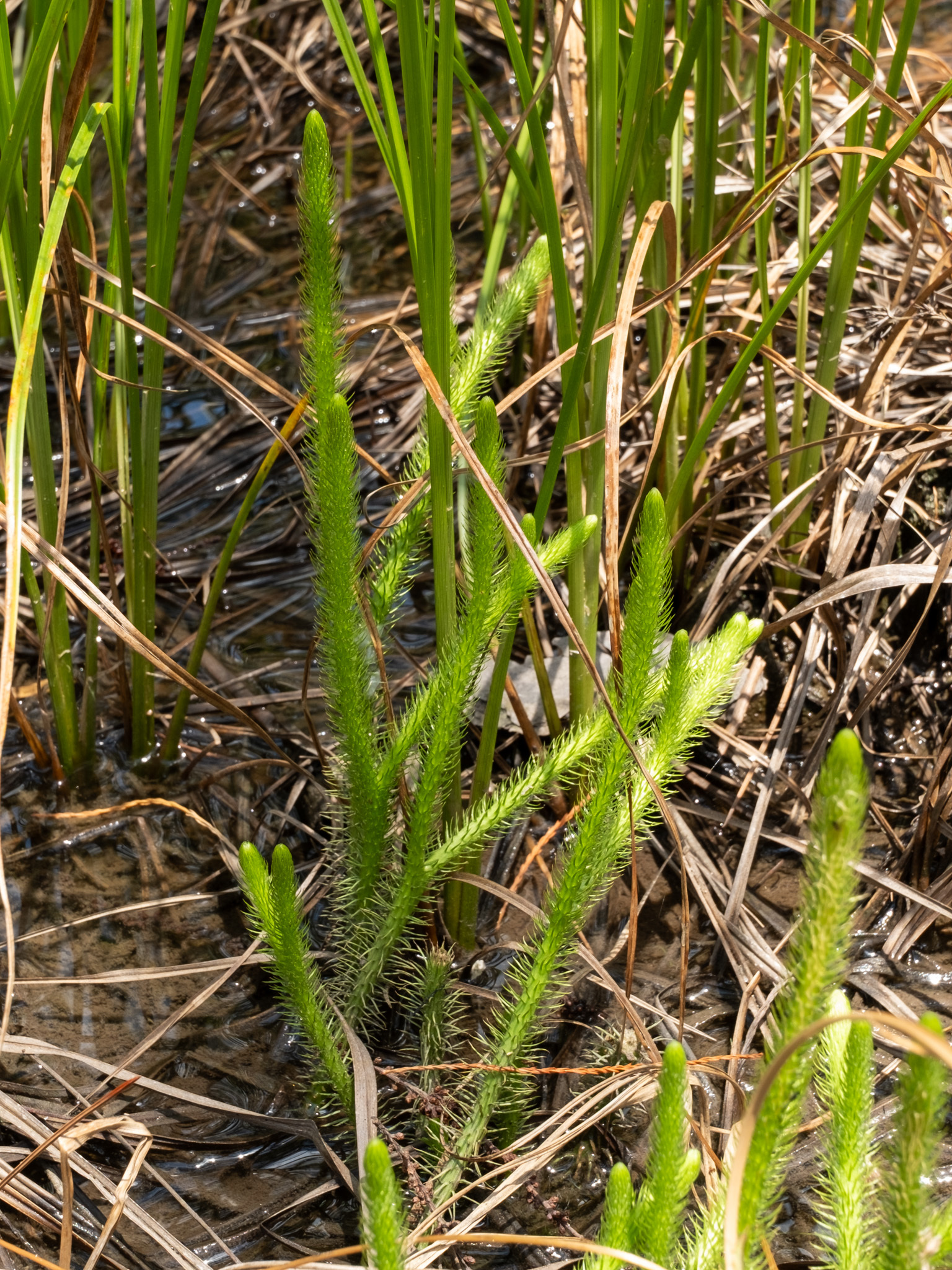

Scientific classification
- Kingdom: Plantae
- Clade: Tracheophytes
- Clade: Lycophytes
- Class: Lycopodiopsida
- Order: Lycopodiales
- Family: Lycopodiaceae
- Genus: Lycopodiella
- Species: L. alopecuroides

Binomial name
- Lycopodiella alopecuroides (L.) Cranfill

Synonyms
- Lycopodium alopecuroides L.

= Lycopodiella alopecuroides =

Species of spore-bearing plant

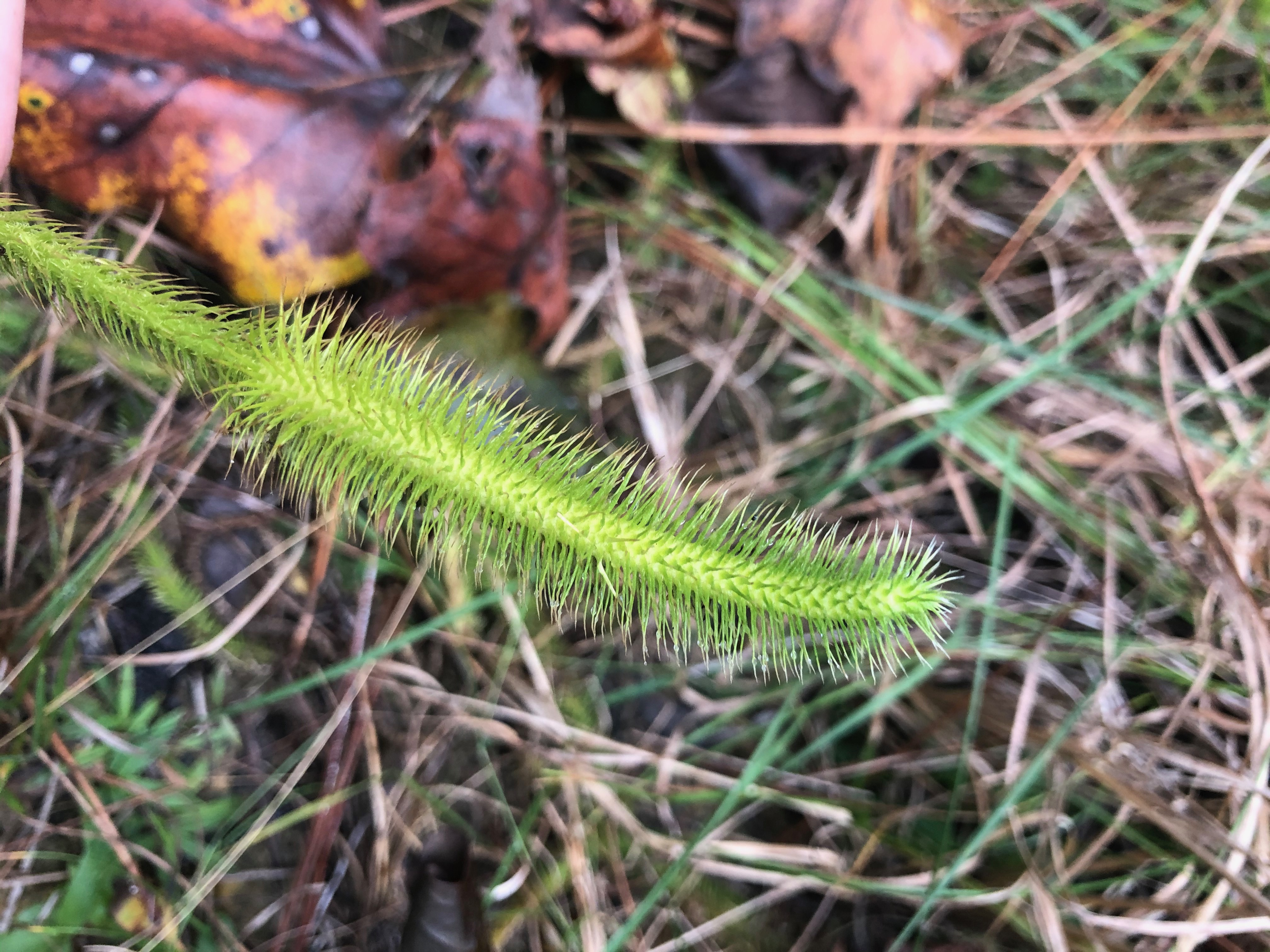
Lycopodiella alopecuroides (L.) Cranfill

Lycopodiella alopecuroides, the foxtail clubmoss, is a species of perennial vascular plant in the club-moss family, Lycopodiaceae. It is commonly found along the Atlantic seaboard and has recently been discovered in the state of Maine. The family, Lycopodiaceae contains nearly 15 genera and about 375 species

Originally named by Linnaeus, this species has since been reviewed by Raimond Cranfill. Foxtail clubmoss is the common name for Lycopodiella alopecuroides (L.) Cranfill. This species has horizontal stems growing 100 to 450 mm in length and 1 to 1.5 mm in diameter. Its leaves have marginal teeth near the base, and the plant itself seems to have a high tendency to arch. The plant itself typically inhabits wet, sandy soils and peat swamps.

It has spores containing a flammable powder which was historically used in flash photography. This spore powder was also used by ‘fire-breathers’ in the circus.
