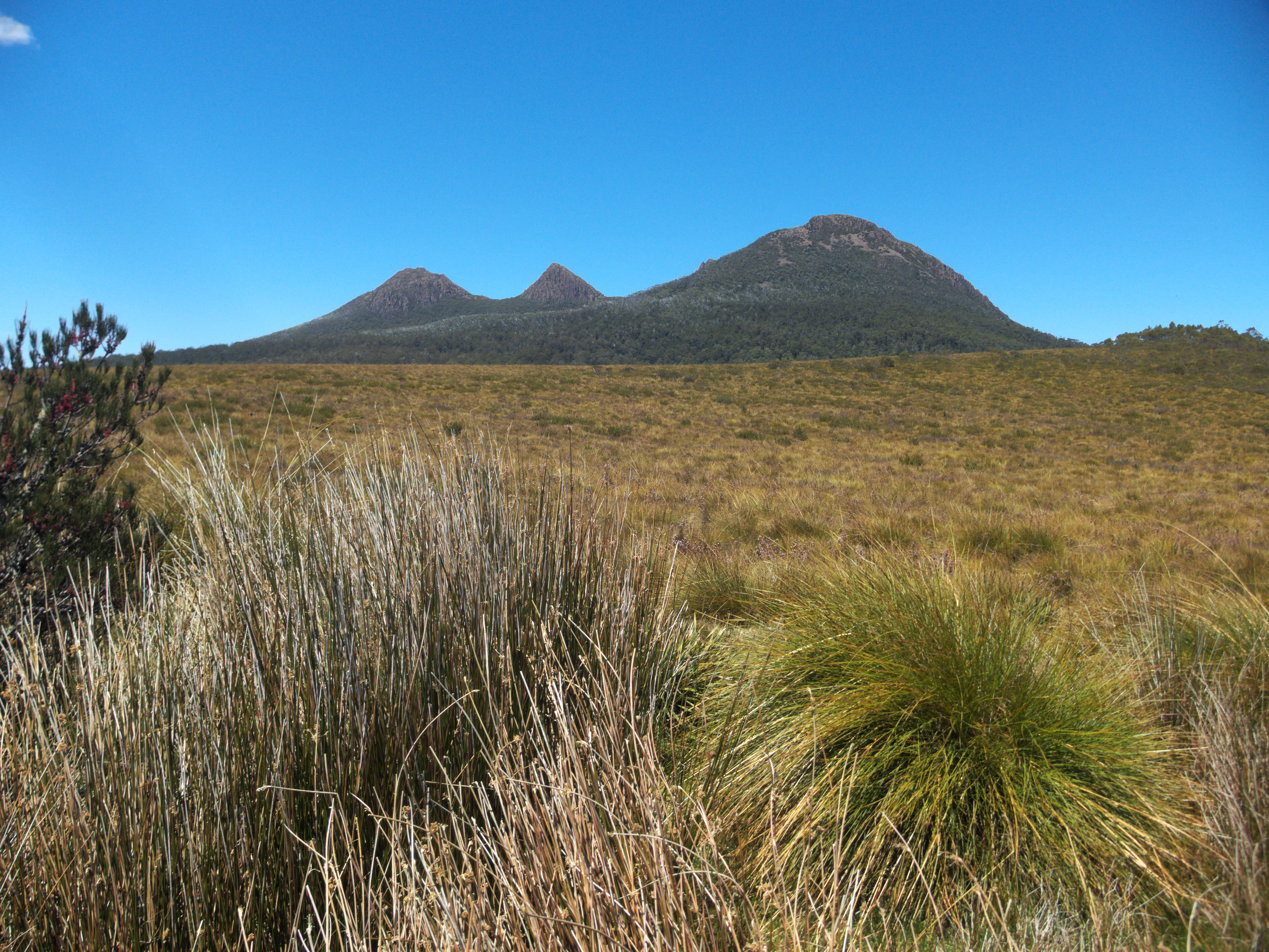

Scientific classification
- Kingdom: Plantae
- Clade: Tracheophytes
- Clade: Angiosperms
- Clade: Monocots
- Clade: Commelinids
- Order: Poales
- Family: Cyperaceae
- Genus: Gymnoschoenus; Nees, 1841

Species
- Gymnoschoenus anceps (R.Br.) C.B.Clarke; Gymnoschoenus sphaerocephalus (R.Br.) Hook.f.

= Gymnoschoenus =

Genus of grass-like plants

Gymnoschoenus is a genus of tussock-forming grasses in the family Cyperaceae. It is endemic to southern Australia.
