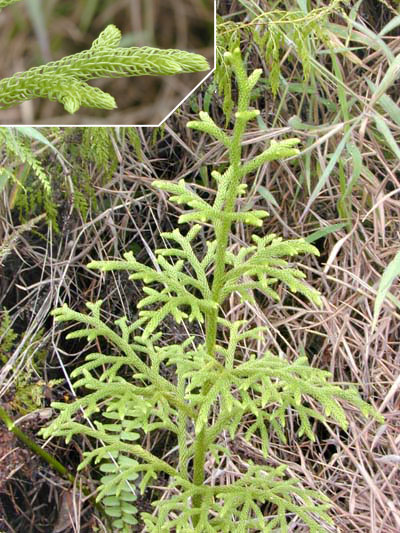
- Palhinhaea cernua

Scientific classification
- Kingdom: Plantae
- Clade: Tracheophytes
- Clade: Lycophytes
- Class: Lycopodiopsida
- Order: Lycopodiales
- Family: Lycopodiaceae
- Subfamily: Lycopodielloideae
- Genus: Palhinhaea; Franco & Vasc.

Species
- See text.

= Palhinhaea =

Genus of plants

Palhinhaea is a genus of lycophytes in the family Lycopodiaceae. In the Pteridophyte Phylogeny Group classification of 2016 (PPG I), it is placed in the subfamily Lycopodielloideae. Some sources do not recognize the genus, sinking it into Lycopodiella. Palhinhaea species are widespread in the tropics and subtropics.

== Species ==
As of June 2025, the Checklist of Ferns and Lycophytes of the World recognized the following twenty-seven species:

Binomial	Notes	Distribution	Image
Palhinhaea bradei (Nessel) Holub		Brazil	
Palhinhaea brevibracteata (Alderw.) Holub		New Guinea	
Palhinhaea camporum (B.Øllg. & P.G.Windisch) Holub		South America	
Palhinhaea cernua (L.) Vasc. & Franco		worldwide	
Palhinhaea cerrojefensis B.Øllg.		Panama	
Palhinhaea crassifolia (Spring) Fraser-Jenk. & Kholia		India and Southeast Asia	
Palhinhaea curvata (Sw.) Holub		Central and South America, Greater Antilles	
Palhinhaea descendens (B.Øllg.) Holub		Andean South America	
Palhinhaea divaricata B.Øllg.		Central America	
Palhinhaea eichleri (Fée) Holub		Brazil	
Palhinhaea glaucescens (C.Presl) Holub		Central and South America	
Palhinhaea hainanensis C.Y.Yang		Southeast Asia	
Palhinhaea hydrophila (Alderw.) comb. ined.	currently Lycopodiella hydrophila (Alderw.) P.J.Edwards	New Guinea	
Palhinhaea lehmannii (Hieron.) Holub		northern South America	
Palhinhaea lugubris B.Øllg.		Bolivia	
Palhinhaea maniculata (B.Øllg.) B.Øllg.		northern South America	
Palhinhaea pendulina (Hook.) Holub		Central and South America	
Palhinhaea pseudocurvata B.Øllg.		northern South America, Greater Antilles	
Palhinhaea pungens (Alderw.) Holub		Malesia	
Palhinhaea raiateensis (J.W.Moore) comb. ined.	currently Lycopodium raiateense J.W.Moore	Society Islands	
Palhinhaea reflexifolia B.Øllg.		Andean South America	
Palhinhaea riofrioi (Sodiro) Holub		Central and South America	
Palhinhaea steyermarkii (B.Øllg.) Holub		Central and northern South America	
Palhinhaea tomentosa (Alderw.) Holub		New Guinea	
Palhinhaea torta (Sieber ex Underw. & F.E.Lloyd) Christenh.		Lesser Antilles	
Palhinhaea trianae (Hieron.) Holub		northern South America	
Palhinhaea veigae Vasc.	(epithet is also wrongly spelt viegae)	Madeira	
