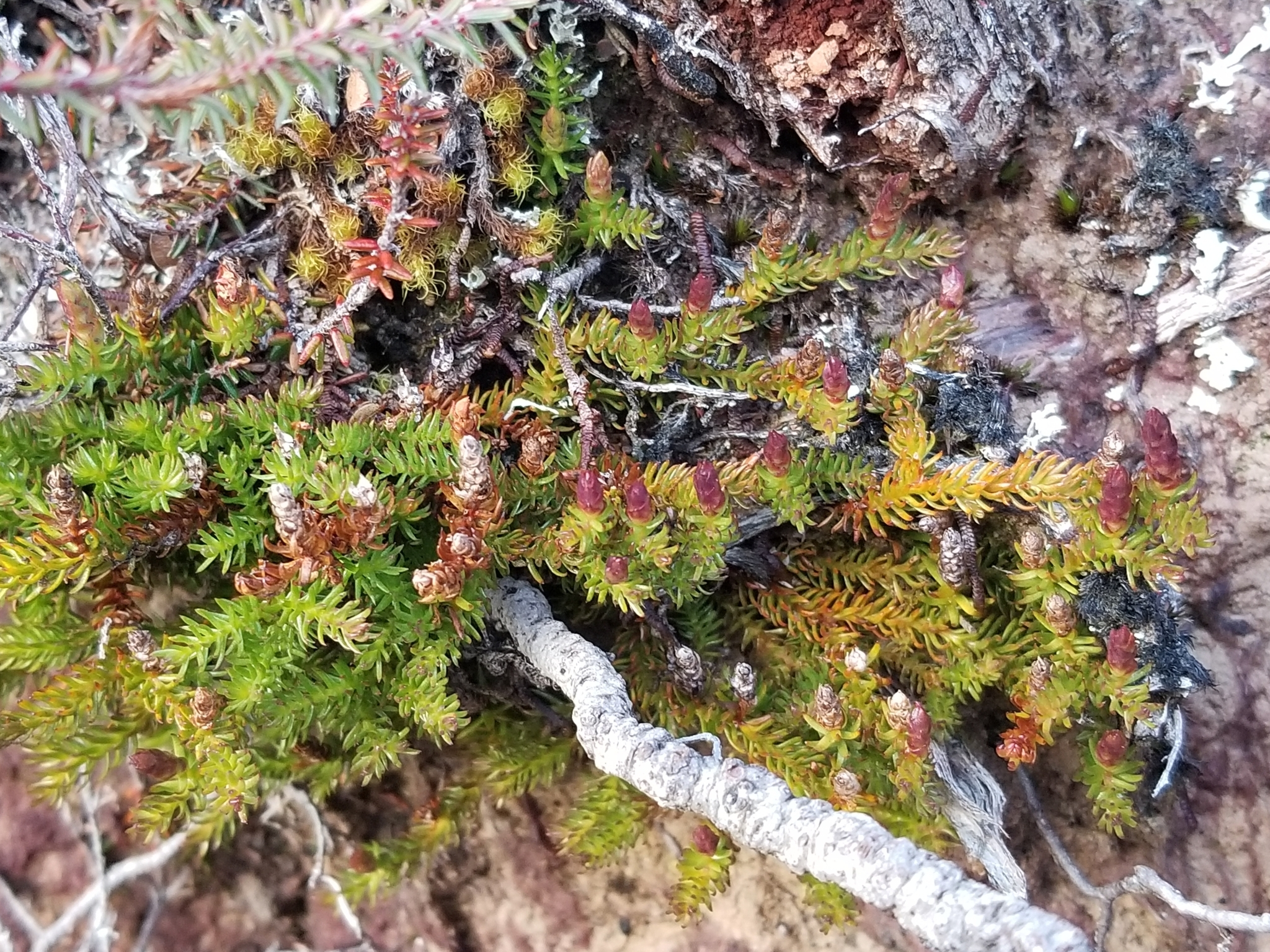
- Growing in the Mount Rochfort Conservation Area on the South Island of New Zealand.
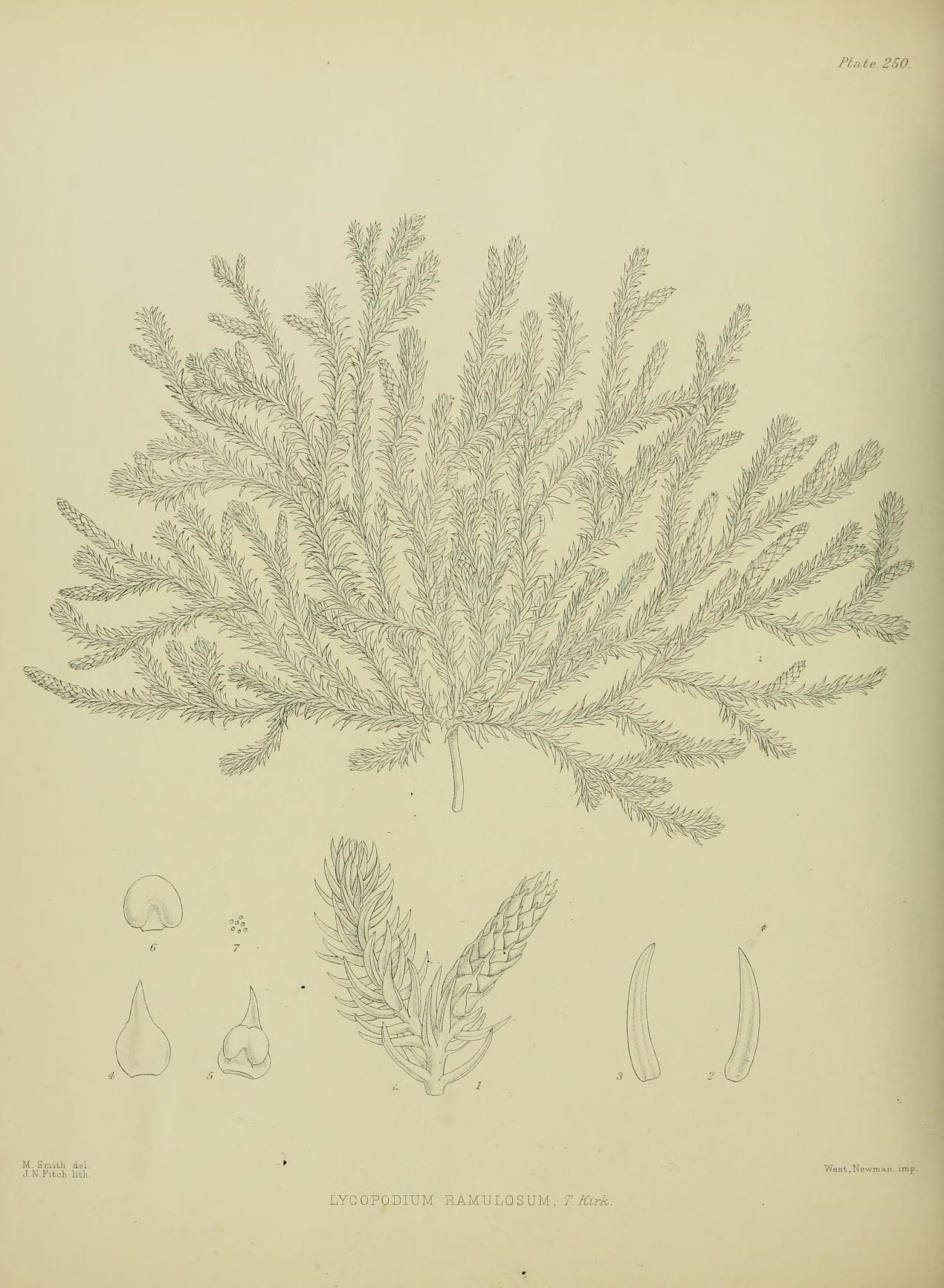

Scientific classification
- Kingdom: Plantae
- Clade: Tracheophytes
- Clade: Lycophytes
- Class: Lycopodiopsida
- Order: Lycopodiales
- Family: Lycopodiaceae
- Genus: Lateristachys
- Species: L. diffusa

Binomial name
- Lateristachys diffusa (R.Br.) Holub

Synonyms
- Lycopodiella diffusa (R.Br.) B.Øllg.; Lycopodium diffusum R.Br.; Lycopodium laterale var. diffusum (R.Br.) Hook.f.; Lycopodium ramulosum Kirk; Lepidotis diffusa (R.Br.) Rothm.; Lateristachys ramulosa (Kirk) Holub; Lycopodiella ramulosa (Kirk) B.Øllg.

= Lateristachys diffusa =

Species of spore-bearing plant

Lateristachys diffusa, synonym Lycopodiella diffusa, known as carpet clubmoss, is a species of clubmoss in the family Lycopodiaceae. It is indigenous to New Zealand and to Tasmania, Australia.

== Description ==
The main stems of this plant are found underground when growing on boggy terrain, but can occur above ground in dryer habitats. The stems are normally not more than 25 cm in length and root at intervals.

== Taxonomy ==
The first description of this plant was published in 1810 in Prodromus Florae Novae Hollandiae et Insulae Van Diemen by Robert Brown.

== Ecology ==
Analysis of fossilised excrement of the kākāpō has shown that this plant was historically part of the diet of that endangered bird.

== Conservation status ==
The Department of Conservation in New Zealand classifies Lateristachys diffusa as Not Threatened.
