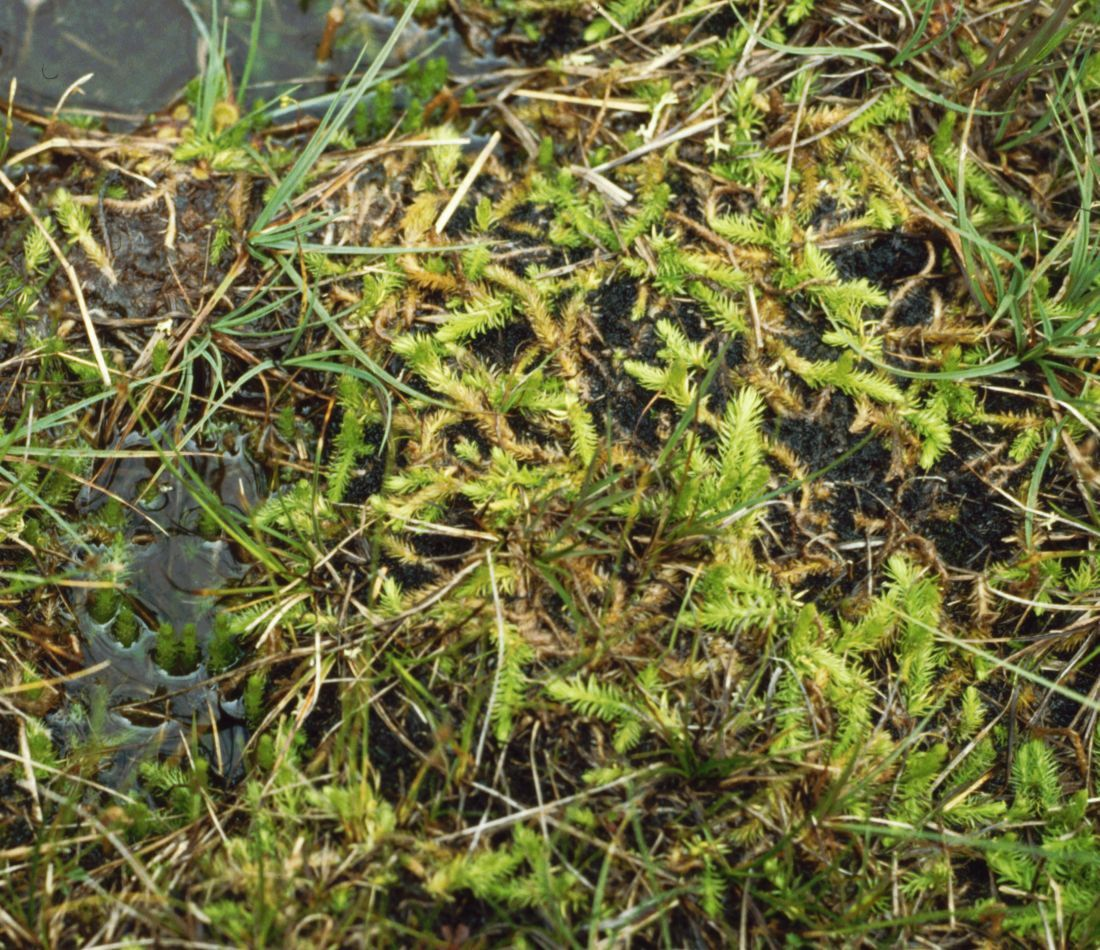
- Lycopodiella inundata

Scientific classification
- Kingdom: Plantae
- Clade: Tracheophytes
- Clade: Lycophytes
- Class: Lycopodiopsida
- Order: Lycopodiales
- Family: Lycopodiaceae
- Subfamily: Lycopodielloideae
- Genus: Lycopodiella; Holub

Type species
- Lycopodium inundatum L.

Species
- See text

= Lycopodiella =

Genus of spore-bearing plants

Lycopodiella is a genus in the clubmoss family Lycopodiaceae. The genus members are commonly called bog clubmosses, describing their wetland habitat. In the past, the genus was often incorporated within the related genus Lycopodium, but was segregated in 1964. In the Pteridophyte Phylogeny Group classification of 2016 (PPG I), Lycopodiella is placed in the subfamily Lycopodielloideae, along with three other genera. In this circumscription, the genus has about 15 species. Other sources use a wider circumscription, in which the genus is equivalent to the Lycopodielloideae of PPG I, in which case about 40 species and hybrids are accepted. Narrowly circumscribed, the genus has a circumboreal distribution, extending south in the Americas throughout tropical South America.

== Description ==
Like all clubmosses, Lycopodiella species are vascular, non-flowering plants which reproduce by spore. Their stems grow horizontally on wet ground, with roots extending directly from the stem. Upright branches arise from the dorsal surface of the stems, forming the peduncles of spore-bearing strobili. These upright branches may be unbranched or up to three times forked.

In the strobili, the sporophylls occur in alternating pseudowhorls of 5 or more, resulting in 10 or more longitudinal ranks of leaves. They have both veinal and basal mucilage canals. Sporangia are located in the axil where the sporophylls diverge from the upright stem. Sporangia are anisovalvate (splitting into unequal portions when they open).

Gametophytes occur on the surface of the substrate and are at least partially photosynthetic.

== Life cycle ==
Lycopodiella life cycles include an independent sporophyte stage and a long-lived gametophyte stage. Individuals reproduce by single-celled spores that disperse and germinate into small plants when in suitable conditions. This part of the plant is called the gametophyte; it produces the eggs and sperm. In Lycopodiella the gametophytes grow on the surface of the soil and are partially photosynthetic. After fertilization, the embryos grow into sporophytes, which are larger spore-bearing plants. The sporophyte is the vegetative part of the plant seen in nature. Juvenile individuals typically re-sprout in the spring or after a fire. Individuals have a base chromosome number of 78.

== Taxonomy ==
The distinctness of these species was recognized by John Gilbert Baker, who placed species of both the current Lycopodiella s.s. and Pseudolycopodiella (including Brownseya) in an informal "group of L. inundatum", within subgenus Lepidotis; like most of his contemporaries, he placed all clubmosses and firmosses in a very broadly circumscribed Lycopodium. Ernst Georg Pritzel gave this group sectional rank within subgenus Rhopalostachya in 1902 in his treatment for Die Natürlichen Pflanzenfamilien. Wilhelm Gustav Franz Herter treated the group as subgenus Inundatostachys, after removing the doubtfully placed Lycopodium cruentum. In 1944, Werner Rothmaler began to raise some of the groups formerly included in Lycopodium to generic rank. He raised Baker & Pritzel's group to a subgenus of Lepidotis. Josef Ludwig Holub felt that Lepidotis, as circumscribed by Rothmaler, was still too heterogenous, and founded the genus Lycopodiella to accommodate these species in 1964. The name, a diminutive of Lycopodium, was inspired by the Czech common name (and diminutive) "plavuňka". The type species of the genus is Lycopodiella inundata.

Holub would subsequently subdivide the group by erecting the genus Pseudolycopodiella in 1983, typified on Pseudolycopodiella caroliniana. He distinguished them based on features such as the dimorphic stem leaves projecting on either side of the horizontal stem and the lack of veinal mucilage canals (versus leaves of uniform shape and veinal mucilage canals present in Lycopodiella s.s.). Holub's disintegration of Lycopodium into smaller genera was not universally accepted. Benjamin Øllgaard's global classification in 1987 treated Lycopodiella in a broader sense, including not only Pseudolycopodiella but Lateristachys and Palhinhaea, although he recognized Holub's four genera at sectional level. However, North American treatments by Herb Wagner and Joe Beitel in 1992 and Arthur Haines in 2003 both accepted Holub's recognition of Lycopodiella and Pseudolycopodiella.

The molecular phylogeny of Wikström and Kendrick published in 2000 supported the monophyly of sect. Lycopodiella (Lycopodiella s.s.) and sect. Campylostachys (Palhinhaea) but could not resolve consistent relationships among Øllgaard's four sections. Surprisingly, sect. Caroliniana (Pseudolycopodiella), felt to be the most "primitive" anatomically, did not diverge before the rest of the group.

In the Pteridophyte Phylogeny Group classification of 2016 (PPG I), Lycopodiella is placed in the subfamily Lycopodielloideae, along with three other genera (Lateristachys, Palhinhaea and Pseudolycopodiella). In 2022, an additional monotypic genus, Brownseya, was segregated from Pseudolycopodiella to render the latter monophyletic. Other sources do not recognize these genera, submerging them into Lycopodiella.

== Species ==
As of November 2025, the Checklist of Ferns and Lycophytes of the World recognized the twelve species below. In addition, four undescribed species have been differentiated in the Great Lakes region, and dwarfed plants from Hispaniola similar to L. alopecuroides with short, erect stalks represent an undescribed taxon.

Binomial	Common name	Distribution	Image
Lycopodiella alopecuroides (L.) Cranfill	foxtail clubmoss	North America and Cuba (Note: Several South American species were formerly included in a broadly circumscribed L. alopecuroides, so the southern limit of its distribution is not entirely clear.)	
Lycopodiella andicola B.Øllg.		northern Andes Mountains	
Lycopodiella appressa (Chapm.) Cranfill	southern clubmoss, appressed bog clubmoss	eastern North America, Cuba	
Lycopodiella duseniana (B.Øllg. & P.G.Windisch) B.Øllg.		Brazil	
Lycopodiella geometra B.Øllg. & P.G.Windisch		southern South America	
Lycopodiella inundata (L.) Holub	marsh clubmoss or bog clubmoss	circumboreal cool temperate	
Lycopodiella longipes (Hook. & Grev.) Holub		Central and South America, Cuba	
Lycopodiella margueriteae J.G.Bruce	northern prostrate clubmoss	central and eastern United States	
Lycopodiella mathewsii (Hook.) Holub		northern South America	
Lycopodiella prostrata (R.M.Harper) Cranfill	feather stem clubmoss	southeastern United States	
Lycopodiella subappressa J.G.Bruce, W.H.Wagner & Beitel	northern appressed clubmoss	central and eastern United States	
Lycopodiella tupiana (B.Øllg. & P.G.Windisch) B.Øllg.		southern South America	

Five hybrids have also been described:

Binomial	Hybrid formula	Distribution	Image
Lycopodiella × brucei Cranfill	L. appressa × prostrata	southern United States	
Lycopodiella × copelandii (Eiger) Cranfill	L. alopecuroides × appressa	eastern United States	
Lycopodiella × gilmanii A.Haines	L. appressa × inundata	eastern North America	
Lycopodiella × robusta (R.J.Eaton) A.Haines	L. alopecuroides × inundata	eastern United States	
Lycopodiella × shortii D.D.Spauld.	L. alopecuroides × prostrata	southern United States	

== Distribution and habitat ==
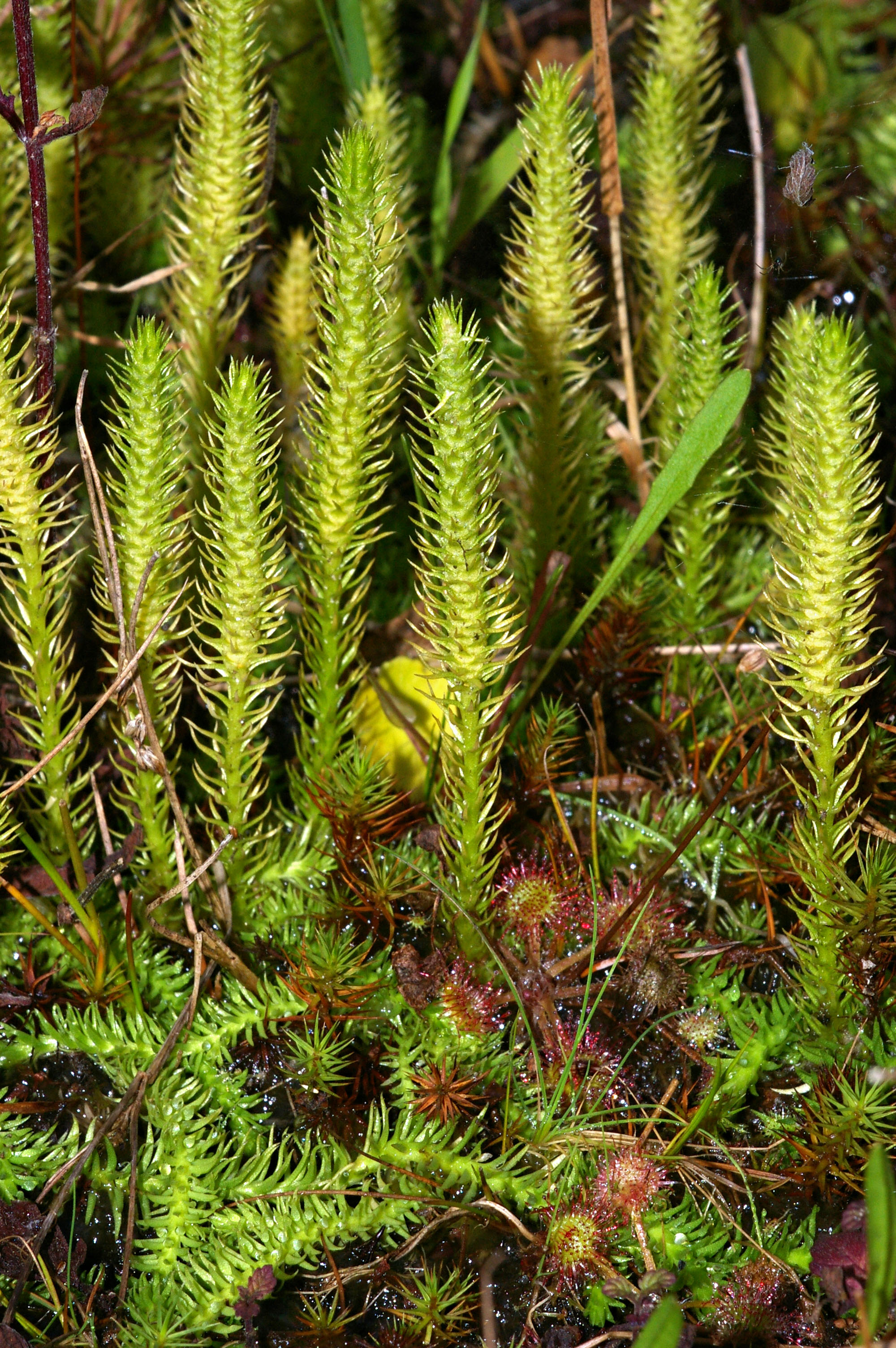
Lycopodiella inundata

Lycopodiella (in the narrower circumscription used here) is distributed throughout the north-temperate regions of the world, and south through tropical America as far as northern Argentina. They typically grow on wet, sandy soil, among grasses or on open soil with at most a thin organic layer.

=== North America ===
The known Lycopodiella in North America consists of six species and four hybrids. All but one species of Lycopodiella, Lycopodiella inundata, are limited to the East coast, Gulf of Mexico, and/or Great Lakes region. L. inundata is found from New England to Alaska and down into California.
