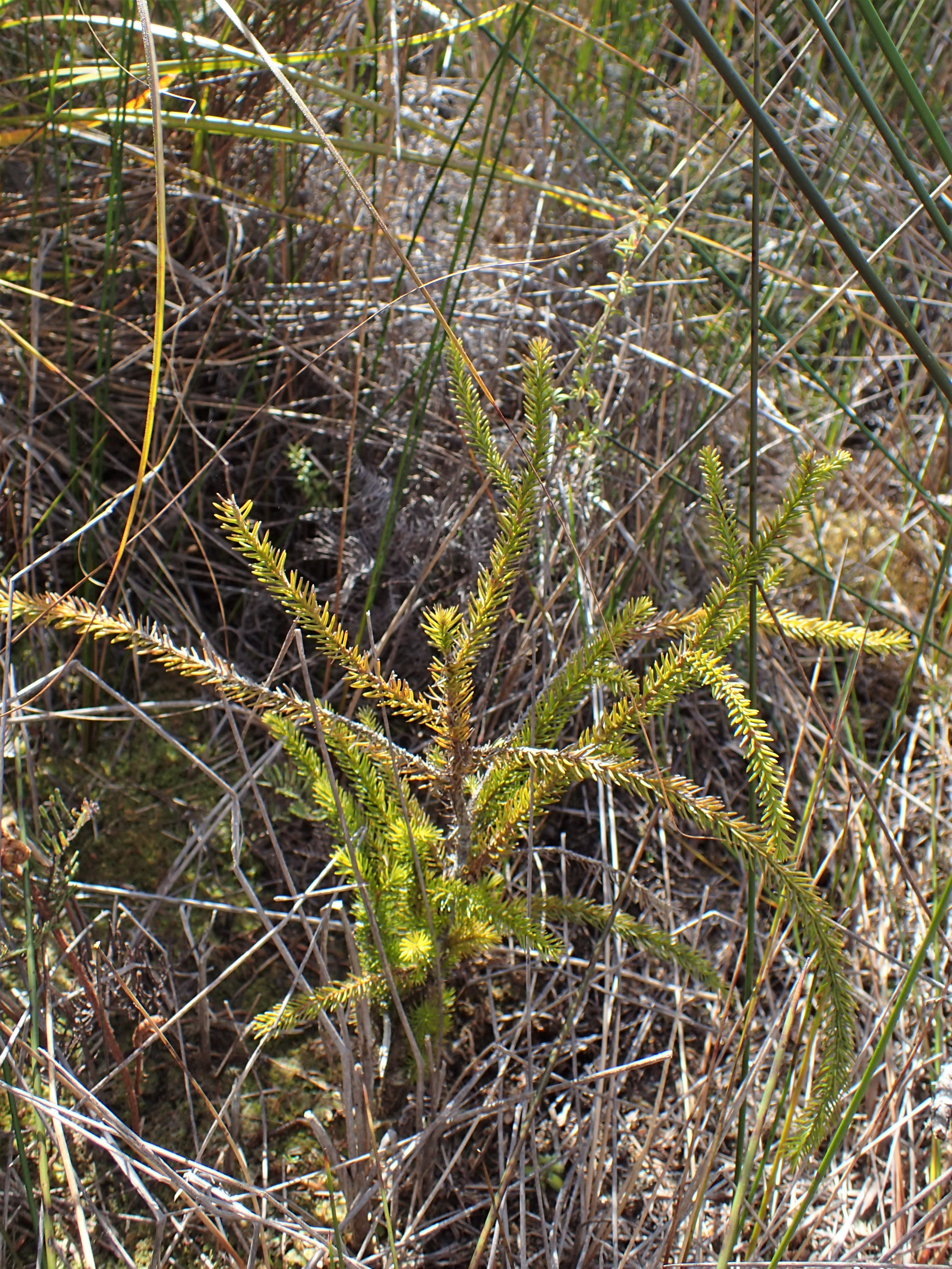
- Lateristachys lateralis

Scientific classification
- Kingdom: Plantae
- Clade: Tracheophytes
- Clade: Lycophytes
- Class: Lycopodiopsida
- Order: Lycopodiales
- Family: Lycopodiaceae
- Subfamily: Lycopodielloideae
- Genus: Lateristachys; Holub

Type species
- Lycopodium laterale R.Br.

Species
- See text.

= Lateristachys =

Genus of spore-bearing plants

Lateristachys is a genus of lycophytes in the family Lycopodiaceae. In the Pteridophyte Phylogeny Group classification of 2016 (PPG I), it is placed in the subfamily Lycopodielloideae. Some sources do not recognize the genus, sinking it into Lycopodiella. Lateristachys species are native to the Philippines, Australia and New Zealand.

== Species ==
As of June 2025, the Checklist of Ferns and Lycophytes of the World recognized three species:

Binomial	Distribution	Image
Lateristachys diffusa (R.Br.) Holub	Australia and New Zealand	
Lateristachys halconensis (Copel.) Holub	Philippines	
Lateristachys lateralis (R.Br.) Holub	Australia, New Zealand, New Caledonia	

== Taxonomy ==
Josef Ludwig Holub formally raised this group to the status of genus as Lateristachys in 1983.
