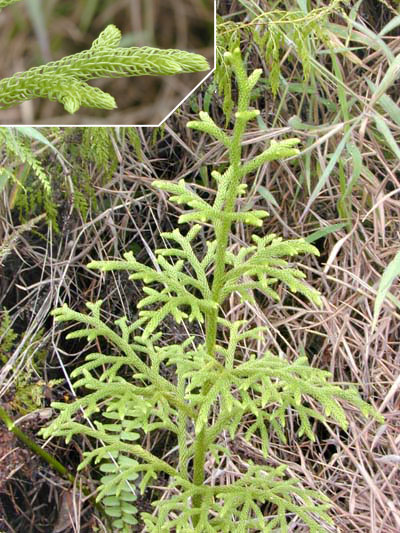

Conservation status
- Secure (NatureServe)

- Least Concern (IUCN 3.1)

Scientific classification
- Kingdom: Plantae
- Clade: Tracheophytes
- Clade: Lycophytes
- Class: Lycopodiopsida
- Order: Lycopodiales
- Family: Lycopodiaceae
- Genus: Palhinhaea
- Species: P. cernua

Binomial name
- Palhinhaea cernua (L.) Vasc. & Franco

Synonyms
- Lepidotis cernua (L.) P.Beauv.; Lycopodiella cernua (L.) Pic.Serm.; Lycopodium boryanum A.Rich.; Lycopodium brevibracteatum Alderw.; Lycopodium capillaceum (Spring) Hieron.; Lycopodium cernuum L.; Lycopodium cymosum (Fée) L'Herm.ex Hieron.; Lycopodium dichotomum Blanco; Lycopodium ericinum Ces.; Lycopodium heeschii Müll.Hal.; Lycopodium hupeanum K.Müll.; Lycopodium marianum Willd.; Lycopodium moritzii Müll.Hal.; Lycopodium polycephalum Colenso; Lycopodium salakense Treub; Lycopodium secundum Müll.Hal.; Lycopodium sikkimense Müll.Hal.; Lycopodium veneris Herter; Lycopodium vulcanicum Blume; Palhinhaea brevibracteata (Alderw.) Holub; Palhinhaea capillacea (Spring) Holub; Palhinhaea mariana (Willd.) Holub; Palhinhaea polycephala (Colenso) Holub; Palhinhaea salakensis (Treub) Holub

= Palhinhaea cernua =

Species of plant

Palhinhaea cernua, synonym Lycopodiella cernua and Lycopodium cernuum, is a plant in the family Lycopodiaceae, commonly known as the staghorn clubmoss. The Hawaiian name for the plant is wāwaeʻiole, or "rat's foot". It has a substantial number of scientific synonyms in several genera. The genus Palhinhaea is accepted in the Pteridophyte Phylogeny Group classification of 2016 (PPG I), but not in other classifications which submerge the genus in Lycopodiella. It is the largest of the clubmosses, having rhizomes up to 5 m (16 ft) in length, with leafy uprights up to 2.5 m (8 ft 2 in) in height.

== Distribution ==
Palhinhaea cernua is a widespread pan-tropical species, found mostly at higher elevations in subtropical mountain climates of tropical Africa, Asia, the Pacific Islands and the Neotropics. In Europe, it is found in the Azores (where it is possibly native) and formerly on Madeira. It has been introduced in continental Portugal (Valongo), Sicily and Malta.

It favors bog environments.

Palhinhaea cernua is sometimes cultivated.
