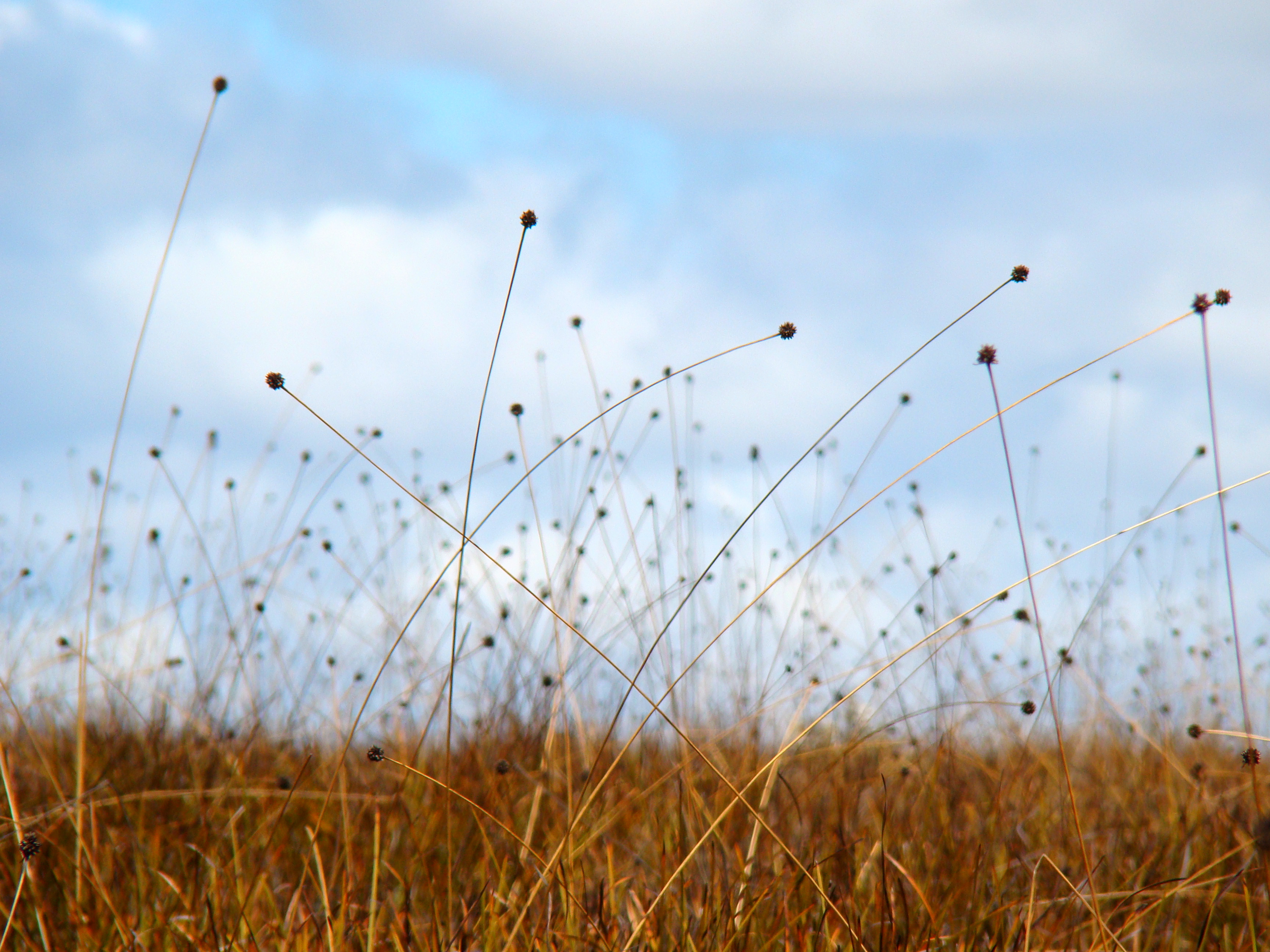
- Buttongrass in December in Tasmania

Scientific classification
- Kingdom: Plantae
- Clade: Tracheophytes
- Clade: Angiosperms
- Clade: Monocots
- Clade: Commelinids
- Order: Poales
- Family: Cyperaceae
- Genus: Gymnoschoenus
- Species: G. sphaerocephalus

Binomial name
- Gymnoschoenus sphaerocephalus (R.Br.) Hook.f.

= Gymnoschoenus sphaerocephalus =

Species of plant

Gymnoschoenus sphaerocephalus, commonly known as buttongrass, is a species of tussock-forming sedge from southeastern Australia. It forms part of a unique habitat in Tasmania.

It was originally described as Chaetospora sphaerocephala by Scottish botanist Robert Brown in his 1810 work Prodromus Florae Novae Hollandiae et Insulae Van Diemen, before being given its current binomial name in 1858 by Joseph Dalton Hooker.

G. sphaerocephalus is a perennial sedge species which forms a clump or tussock. The leaf blades reach 50 cm (20 in) in length, and 0.10–0.25 cm (0.04–0.1 in) in width. The round flowerheads arise out of the tussock, on culms which are up to 1 m (3 ft) high. They are around 1.5–2.0 cm (0.6–0.8 in) in diameter and made up of flattened spikelets 0.5 cm (0.2 in) long. Its root system is a mass of fleshy carbohydrate-rich rhizomes, which are edible.

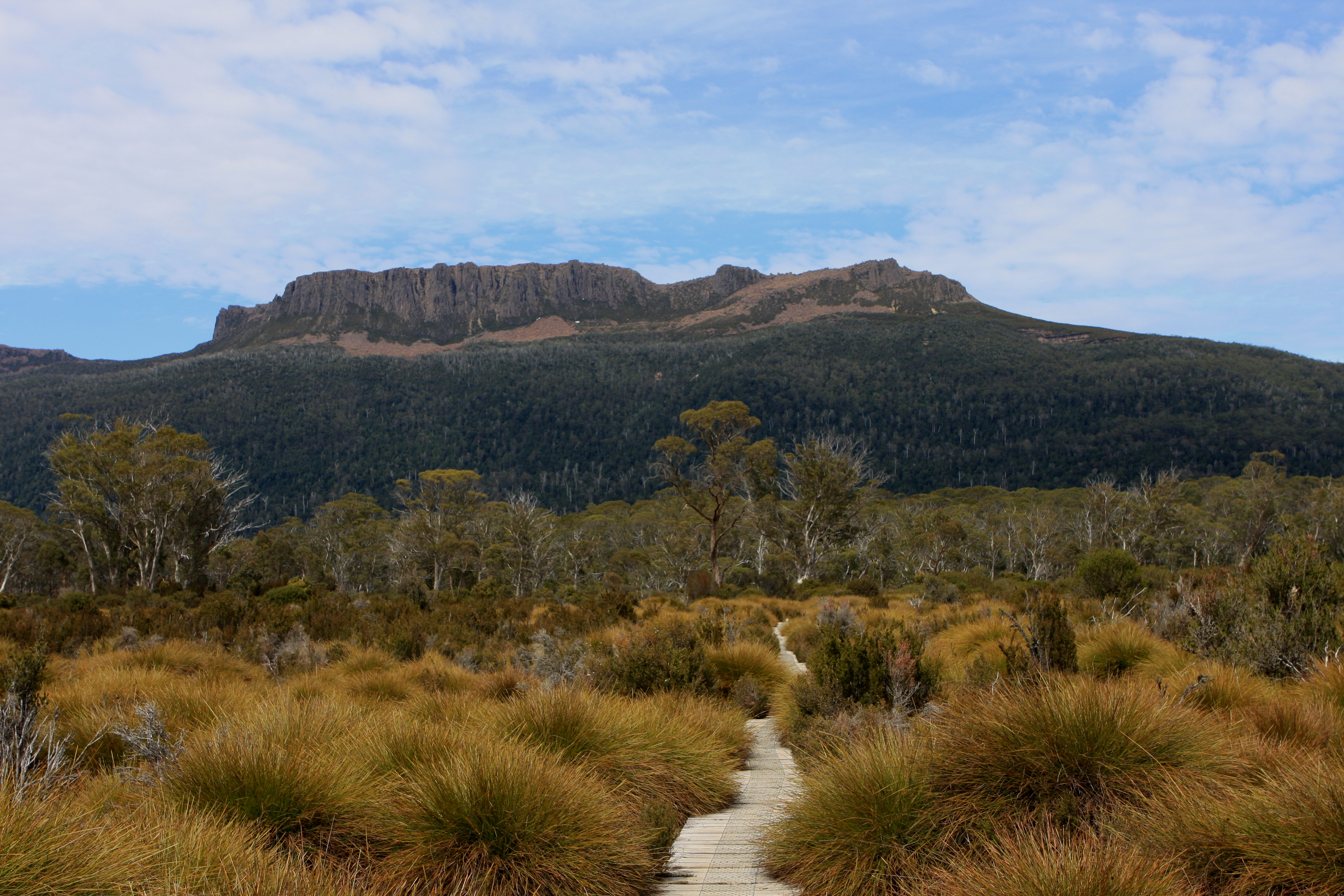
Buttongrassland (foreground) along the Overland Track, Tasmania

In New South Wales it is found from Gibraltar Range (and Myall Lakes on the coast) south to Robertson. In Victoria the plant is known from at least two locations, one to the east of Melbourne in the Beenak State Forest, and the other location being on the eastern side of the Grampians National Park in western Victoria. It is much more abundant and widespread in Tasmania, where it is common in the western part of the state.

G. sphaerocephalus grows in damp nutrient-poor soils, and in Tasmania forms a low grassland or moor in which it is the dominant shrub. Associated primitive plants include club mosses such as Lycopodiella lateralis, and Selaginella uliginosa and the ferns Gleichenia dicarpa and G. alpina. Despite the wet climate, buttongrass is relatively flammable and the ecological community is adapted to regular burning. The leaves of G. sphaerocephalus have the lowest recorded phosphorus content of any plant species. The soil it grows in is a peat which is acidic, with a pH of 3.5 to 4.5.

Buttongrass may form a symbiotic relationship with a species of burrowing crayfish Parastacoides tasmanicus, which aerates the soil with its burrows and in turn feeds on the rhizomes.

It is also a food item of the critically endangered orange-bellied parrot, which breeds in buttongrass moorlands of southwestern Tasmania over the summer.
