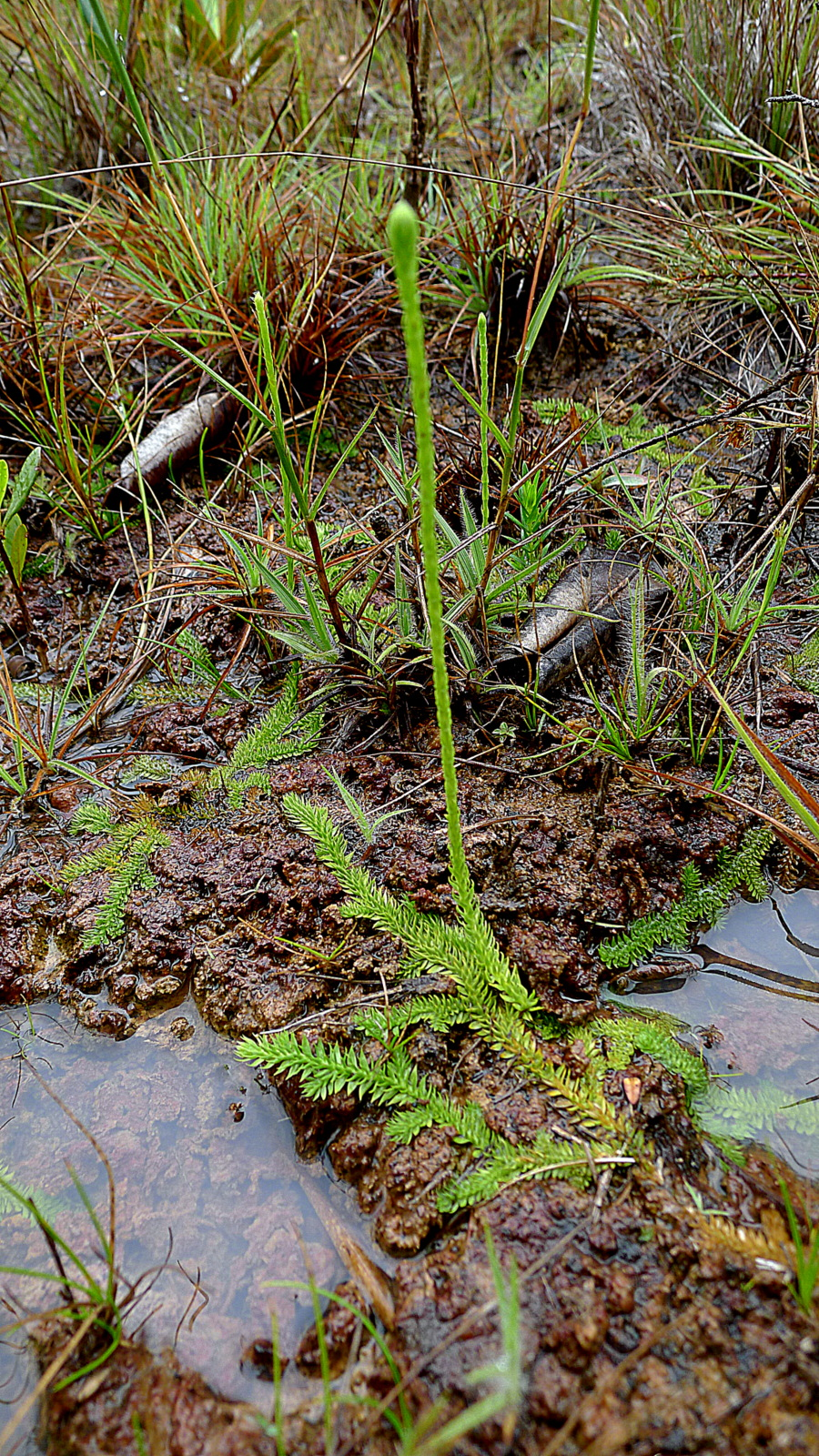
- Pseudolycopodiella caroliniana

Scientific classification
- Kingdom: Plantae
- Clade: Tracheophytes
- Clade: Lycophytes
- Class: Lycopodiopsida
- Order: Lycopodiales
- Family: Lycopodiaceae
- Subfamily: Lycopodielloideae
- Genus: Pseudolycopodiella; Holub

Type species
- Lycopodium carolinianum L.

Species
- See text.

= Pseudolycopodiella =

Genus of spore-bearing plants

Pseudolycopodiella is a genus of non-seed plants in the Lycopodiaceae, long considered part of Lycopodium, but now recognized as a separate genus. It has 10–14 recognized species, only one in North America: Pseudolycopodiella caroliniana.

== Species ==
As of July 2025, the Checklist of Ferns and Lycophytes of the World recognized the sixteen species below.

Binomial	Notes	Distribution	Image
Pseudolycopodiella affinis (Bory) Holub		sub-Saharan Africa, Madagascar, Mascarenes	
Pseudolycopodiella brevipedunculata (Alderw.) Holub		New Guinea	
Pseudolycopodiella carnosa (Silveira) Holub		South America	
Pseudolycopodiella caroliniana (L.) Holub		southern United States, Cuba	
Pseudolycopodiella contexta (C.Mart.) Holub		northern South America	
Pseudolycopodiella floridana K.Cook & Hickey, ined.	Not yet validly published; similar to P. caroliniana but with different ploidy	southern United States, Central America, Greater Antilles	
Pseudolycopodiella iuliformis (Underw. & F.E.Lloyd) Holub		northern South America	
Pseudolycopodiella krameriana (B.Øllg.) B.Øllg.		Suriname	
Pseudolycopodiella limosa (Chinnock) A.R.Field		Queensland	
Pseudolycopodiella meridionalis (Underw. & F.E.Lloyd) Holub		Greater Antilles, Central and South America	
Pseudolycopodiella paradoxa (Mart.) Holub		Central and South America	
Pseudolycopodiella sarcocaulos (Kuhn) Holub		sub-Saharan Africa	
Pseudolycopodiella squamata B.Øllg. & P.G.Windisch		Mato Grosso	
Pseudolycopodiella subinundata (Tagawa) Li Bing Zhang, Xia Wan, Ralf Knapp & H.He		East Asia, Sri Lanka, Malesia	
Pseudolycopodiella tatei (A.C.Sm.) Holub		South America	
Pseudolycopodiella tuberosa (Kuhn) Holub		sub-Saharan Africa, Madagascar, Mascarenes	
