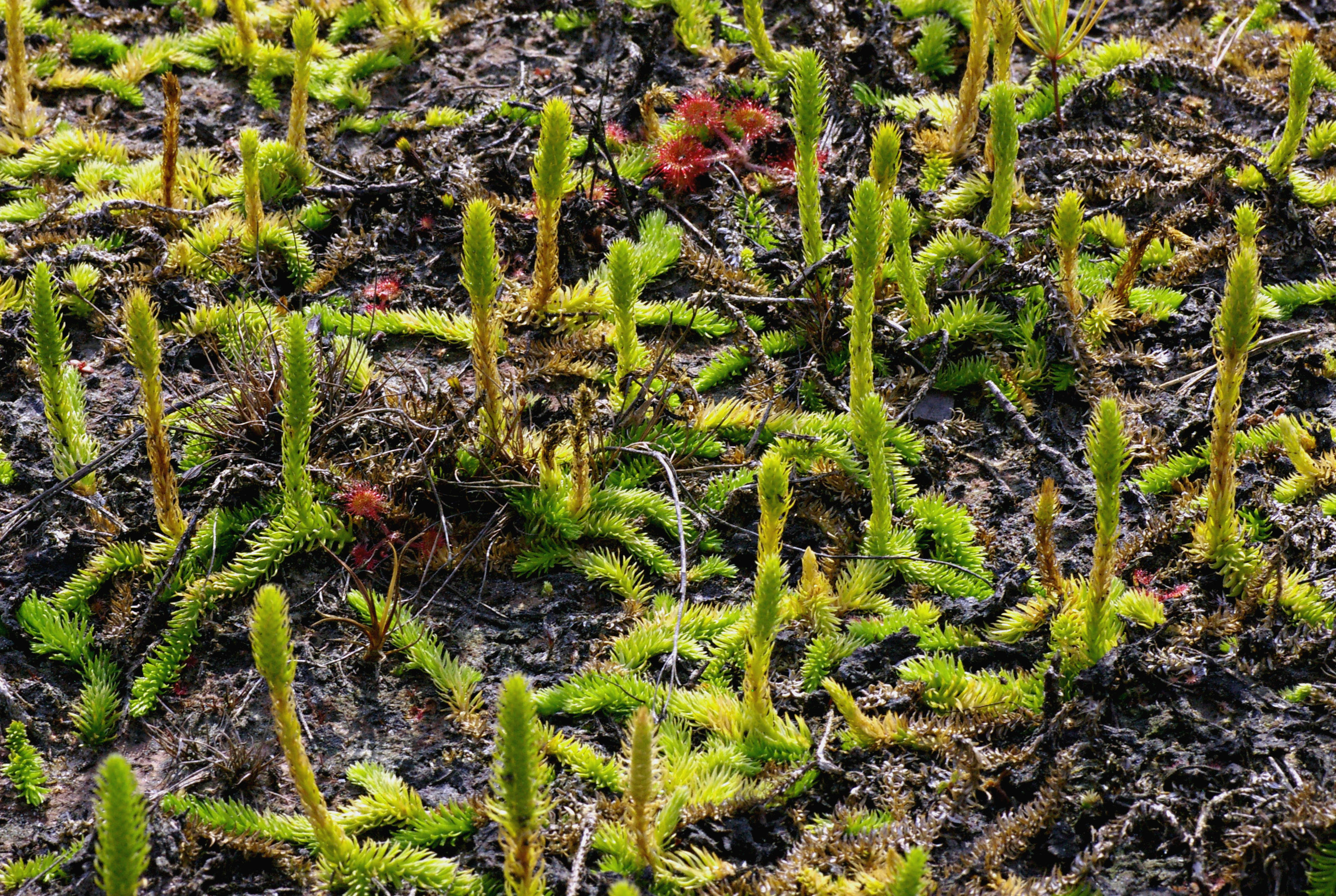

Conservation status
- Secure (NatureServe)

- Least Concern (IUCN 3.1)

Scientific classification
- Kingdom: Plantae
- Clade: Tracheophytes
- Clade: Lycophytes
- Class: Lycopodiopsida
- Order: Lycopodiales
- Family: Lycopodiaceae
- Genus: Lycopodiella
- Species: L. inundata

Binomial name
- Lycopodiella inundata (L.) Holub

Synonyms
- Lycopodium inundatum L.

= Lycopodiella inundata =

Species of spore-bearing plant

Lycopodiella inundata is a species of club moss known by the common names inundated club moss, marsh clubmoss and northern bog club moss. It has a circumpolar and circumboreal distribution, occurring throughout the northern Northern Hemisphere from the Arctic to montane temperate regions in Eurasia and North America. It grows in wet habitat, such as bogs, ponds, moist spots on the tundra, and long-standing borrow pits.

== Description ==
It is a small plant forming patches on the ground, its leafy sterile stems branching and lying horizontal along the ground, rooting at intervals. The sporing cone-bearing stems stand erect in July and August, a few centimeters tall. The leaves are curving, green, narrow, and sharply pointed, measuring a few millimeters long.

== Distribution and habitat ==
This club moss is an arctic-alpine species with a circumpolar boreal and montane distribution in the Northern Hemisphere. It mostly occurs in Europe, but is also present in East Asia and North America. In the British Isles it is classified as a UK Priority Species as it is rare and seems to be on the decline. It occurs in Scotland and the western fringes of England and Wales, and at scattered locations elsewhere. Nevertheless, it can increase rapidly when the conditions are right, as happened at Llyn Cwm-y-ffynnon in Wales on bare peat substrates uncolonised by other plants because of winter inundation, cattle poaching and peat cutting. It occurs at a few locations across Ireland and at one single location in Northern Ireland, at Peatlands Park in County Armagh, and because of its rarity, it is listed as a Northern Ireland Priority Species.
