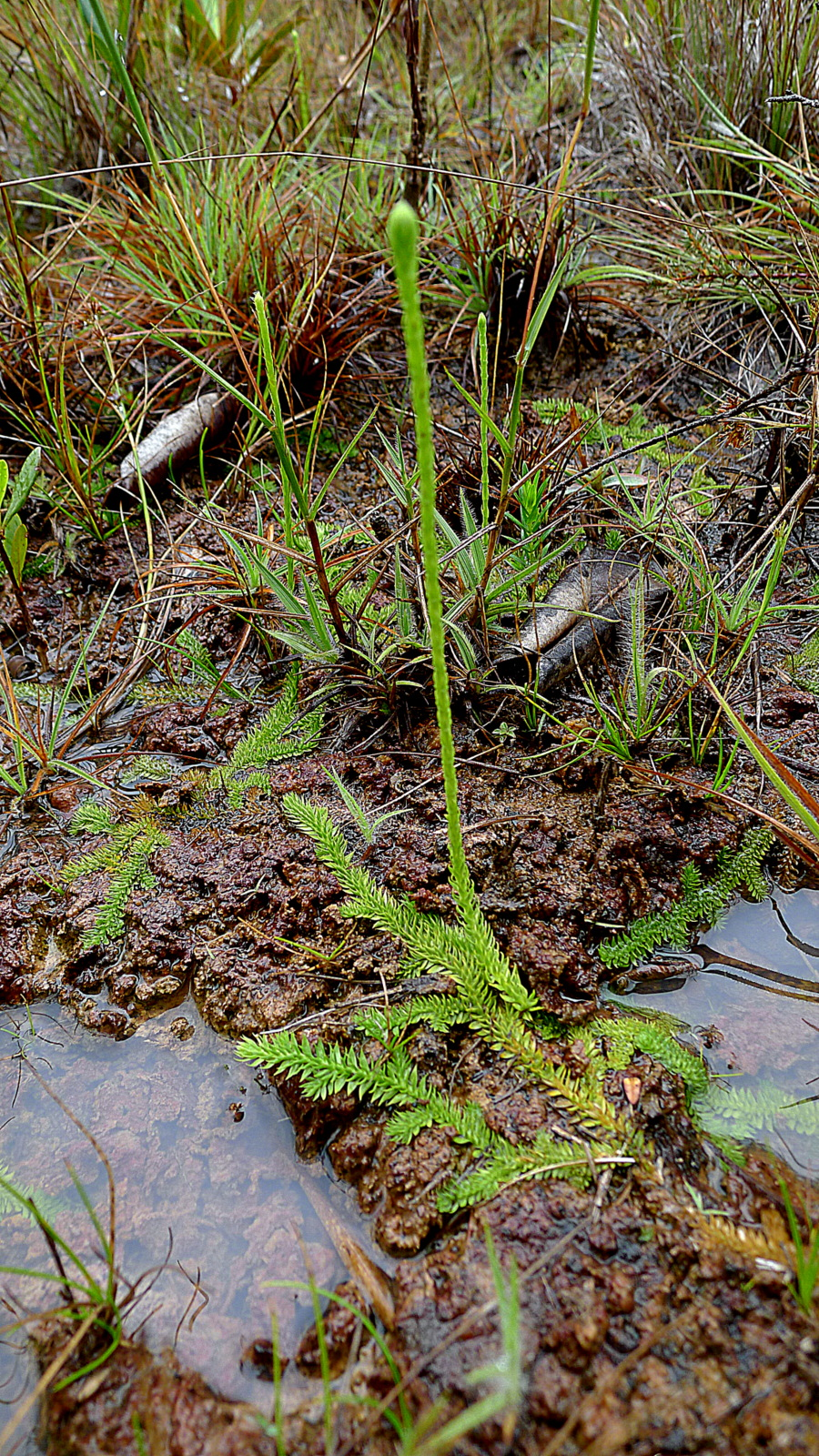

Scientific classification
- Kingdom: Plantae
- Clade: Embryophytes
- Clade: Tracheophytes
- Clade: Lycophytes
- Class: Lycopodiopsida
- Order: Lycopodiales
- Family: Lycopodiaceae
- Genus: Pseudolycopodiella
- Species: P. caroliniana

Binomial name
- Pseudolycopodiella caroliniana (L.) Holub

Synonyms
- Lepidotis caroliniana (L.) P.Beauv.; Lycopodiella caroliniana (L.) Pic.Serm.; Lycopodium carolinianum L.; Lycopodium subinundatum Tagawa

= Pseudolycopodiella caroliniana =

Species of spore-bearing plant

Pseudolycopodiella caroliniana, known as slender bog club-moss, is a species of lycophyte in the family Lycopodiaceae. The genus Pseudolycopodiella is accepted in the Flora of North America and the Pteridophyte Phylogeny Group classification of 2016 (PPG I), but not in other classifications, which submerge the genus in Lycopodiella. The species has a discontinuous distribution, being native to the eastern United States (Alabama, Arkansas, Delaware, Florida, Georgia, Louisiana, Maryland, Massachusetts, Mississippi, New Jersey, New York, North Carolina, Pennsylvania, South Carolina, Texas and Virginia) and to parts of eastern Asia (Sri Lanka, Southeast China, Peninsular Malaysia and Japan).
