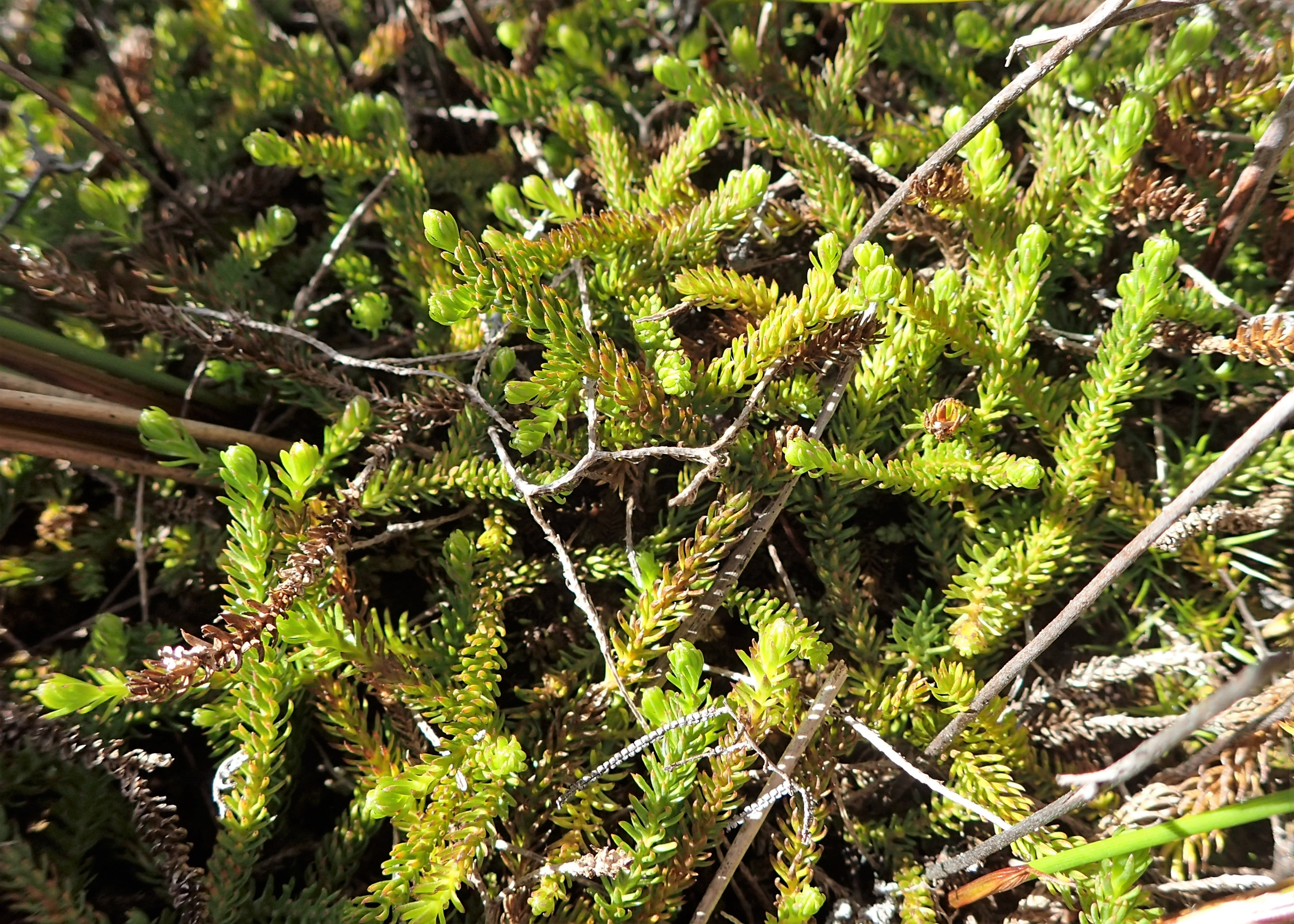
- Growing south of Charleston, New Zealand

Scientific classification
- Kingdom: Plantae
- Clade: Tracheophytes
- Clade: Lycophytes
- Class: Lycopodiopsida
- Order: Lycopodiales
- Family: Lycopodiaceae
- Genus: Lateristachys
- Species: L. lateralis

Binomial name
- Lateristachys lateralis (R.Br.) Holub

Synonyms
- Lycopodiella lateralis (R.Br.) B.Øllg.; Lepidotis lateralis (R.Br.) Rothm.; Lycopodium consimile Colenso; Lycopodium laterale R.Br.

= Lateristachys lateralis =

Species of plant

Lateristachys lateralis, synonym Lycopodiella lateralis, commonly known as slender club moss, is a species of club moss native to eastern Australia and New Zealand. It grows in wet boggy habitat.
