= List of transferred Blechnum species =

Blechnum is a genus of ferns. Two very different circumscriptions of the genus are used by different authors. In the Pteridophyte Phylogeny Group classification of 2016 (PPG I), Blechnum is one of 18 genera in the subfamily Blechnoideae of the family Blechnaceae, and has about 30 species. Other sources place many more species in the genus, with only two other genera in the subfamily. The genus then has about 250 species.

Species placed in Blechnum as of December 2019 by Plants of the World Online, which uses the broad circumscription, but transferred to other genera by the Checklist of Ferns and Lycophytes of the World, which uses the narrow circumscription, are listed below together with their alternative placement.

== A ==
- Blechnum acanthopodum T.C.Chambers & P.A.Farrant = Parablechnum acanthopodum (T.C.Chambers & P.A.Farrant) Gasper & Salino
- Blechnum acutum (Desv.) Mett. = Lomaridium acutum (Desv.) Gasper & V.A.O.Dittrich
- Blechnum aequatoriense A.Rojas = Austroblechnum aequatoriense (A.Rojas) Gasper & V.A.O.Dittrich
- Blechnum × aggregatum (Colenso) Tindale = Austroblechnum × aggregatum (Colenso) Gasper & V.A.O.Dittrich
- Blechnum amabile Makino = Struthiopteris amabilis (Makino) Ching
- Blechnum ambiguum C.Presl = Parablechnum ambiguum (Kaulf. ex C.Presl) C.Presl
- Blechnum andinum C.Chr. = Austroblechnum andinum (Baker) Gasper & V.A.O.Dittrich
- Blechnum articulatum (F.Muell.) S.B.Andrews = Parablechnum articulatum (F.Muell.) Gasper & Salino
- Blechnum ascendens A.Rojas = Austroblechnum ascendens (A.Rojas) Gasper & V.A.O.Dittrich
- Blechnum asperum (Klotzsch) J.W.Sturm = Austroblechnum asperum (Klotzsch) Gasper & V.A.O.Dittrich
- Blechnum atropurpureum A.R.Sm. = Parablechnum atropurpureum (A.R.Sm.) Gasper & Salino
- Blechnum attenuatum (Sw.) Mett. = Lomaridium attenuatum (Sw.) Gasper & V.A.O.Dittrich
- Blechnum auratum (Fée) R.M.Tryon & Stolze = Lomariocycas aurata (Fée) Gasper & A.R.Sm.
- Blechnum austrocaledonicum Christenh. = Doodia gracilis Copel.

== B ==
- Blechnum bakeri C.Chr. = Cranfillia bakeri (C.Chr.) Vázquez Ferreira & Molino S.
- Blechnum banksii (Hook.f.) Mett. = Austroblechnum banksii (Hook. fil.) Gasper & V.A.O.Dittrich
- Blechnum bicolor M.Kessler & A.R.Sm. = Parablechnum bicolor (M.Kessler & A.R.Sm.) Gasper & Salino
- Blechnum biforme (Baker) Christ = Lomaridium biforme (Baker) Gasper & V.A.O.Dittrich
- Blechnum binervatum (Poir.) C.V.Morton & Lellinger = Lomaridium binervatum (Poir.) Gasper & V.A.O.Dittrich
- Blechnum binerve (Hook.) C.Chr. = Lomaridium xiphophyllum (Baker) Gasper & V.A.O.Dittrich
- Blechnum bolivianum M.Kessler & A.R.Sm. = Parablechnum bolivianum (M.Kessler & A.R.Sm.) Gasper & Salino
- Blechnum bonapartei Rakotondr. = Lomaridium bonapartei (Rakotondr.) Gasper & V.A.O.Dittrich
- Blechnum brackenridgei (Carruth.) Perrie & Brownsey = Doodia brackenridgei Carruth.
- Blechnum brasiliense Desv. = Neoblechnum brasiliense (Desv.) Gasper & V.A.O.Dittrich
- Blechnum bruneum M.Kessler & A.R.Sm. = Lomaria brunea (M.Kessler & A.R.Sm.) Gasper & V.A.O.Dittrich

== C ==
- Blechnum camfieldii Tindale = Parablechnum camfieldii (Tindale) Gasper & Salino
- Blechnum capense Burm.f. = Parablechnum capense (Burm. fil.) Gasper & Salino
- Blechnum cartilagineum Sw. = Oceaniopteris cartilaginea (Sw.) Gasper & Salino
- Blechnum castaneum (Makino) Makino & Nemoto = Struthiopteris castanea (Makino) Nakai
- Blechnum chambersii Tindale = Austroblechnum lanceolatum (R.Br.) Gasper & V.A.O.Dittrich
- Blechnum chauliodontum Copel. = Parablechnum chauliodontum (Copel.) Gasper & Salino
- Blechnum chiriquanum (Broadh.) C.Chr. = Parablechnum chiriquanum (Broadh.) Gasper & Salino
- Blechnum christii C.Chr. = Parablechnum christii (C.Chr.) Gasper & Salino
- Blechnum cochabambense M.Kessler & A.R.Sm. = Parablechnum cochabambense (M.Kessler & A.R.Sm.) Gasper & Salino
- Blechnum colensoi (Hook.f.) N.A.Wakef. = Austroblechnum colensoi (Hook. fil.) Gasper & V.A.O.Dittrich
- Blechnum columbiense Hieron. = Lomariocycas columbiensis (Hieron.) Gasper & A.R.Sm.
- Blechnum confusum (Fourn.) Brownlie = Parablechnum confusum (E.Fourn.) Gasper & Salino
- Blechnum contiguum Mett. = Lomaridium contiguum (Mett.) Gasper & V.A.O.Dittrich
- Blechnum corbassonii Brownlie = Parablechnum corbassonii (Brownlie) Gasper & Salino
- Blechnum cordatum (Desv.) Hieron. = Parablechnum cordatum (Desv.) Gasper & Salino
- Blechnum corralense Espinosa = Austroblechnum corralense (Espinosa) Gasper & V.A.O.Dittrich
- Blechnum cyatheoides (Kaulf.) Christenh. = Sadleria cyatheoides Kaulf.
- Blechnum cycadifolium (Colla) J.W.Sturm = Lomariocycas cycadifolia (Colla) Gasper & A.R.Sm.

== D ==
- Blechnum decrescens Rakotondr. = Lomariocycas decrescens (Rakotondr.) Gasper & A.R.Sm.
- Blechnum dendrophilum (Sodiro) C.Chr. = Lomaridium dendrophilum (Sodiro) Gasper & V.A.O.Dittrich
- Blechnum deplanchei (Baker) C.Chr. = Cranfillia deplanchei (Baker) Vázquez Ferreira & Gabriel y Galán
- Blechnum difforme Copel. = Austroblechnum difforme (Copel.) Gasper & V.A.O.Dittrich
- Blechnum dilatatum (Brause) T.C.Chambers & P.A.Farrant = Parablechnum dilatatum (T.C.Chambers & P.A.Farrant) Gasper & Salino
- Blechnum discolor (Forst.) Keyserl. = Lomaria discolor (G.Forst.) Willd.
- Blechnum dissectum (Parris) Christenh. = Doodia dissecta Parris
- Blechnum divergens (Kunze) Mett. = Austroblechnum divergens (Kunze) Gasper & V.A.O.Dittrich
- Blechnum diversifolium Mett. = Diploblechnum diversifolium (Mett.) Gasper & V.A.O.Dittrich
- Blechnum dives (Kunze) Christenh. = Doodia dives Kunze
- Blechnum doodianum Christenh. = Doodia heterophylla (F.M.Bailey) Domin
- Blechnum durum (T.Moore) C.Chr. = Austroblechnum durum (T.Moore) Gasper & V.A.O.Dittrich

== E–F ==
- Blechnum eburneum Christ = Cleistoblechnum eburneum (Christ) Gasper & Salino
- Blechnum egregium Copel. = Oceaniopteris egregia (Copel.) Gasper & Salino
- Blechnum ensiforme (Liebm.) C.Chr. = Lomaridium ensiforme (Liebm.) Gasper & V.A.O.Dittrich
- Blechnum falciforme (Liebm.) C.Chr. = Parablechnum falciforme (Liebm.) Gasper & Salino
- Blechnum fernandezianum (Looser) Prada & Rolleri = Austroblechnum fernandezianum (Looser) Gasper & V.A.O.Dittrich
- Blechnum filiforme (A.Cunn.) Ettingsh. = Icarus filiformis (A.Cunn.) Gasper & Salino
- Blechnum finlaysonianum Wall. ex Hook. & Grev. = Blechnopsis finlaysoniana (Wall. ex Hook. & Grev.) C.Presl
- Blechnum floresii C.Chr. = Austroblechnum divergens (Kunze) Gasper & V.A.O.Dittrich
- Blechnum fluviatile (R.Br.) Lowe = Cranfillia fluviatilis (R.Br.) Gasper & V.A.O.Dittrich
- Blechnum fragile (Liebm.) C.V.Morton & Lellinger = Lomaridium fragile (Liebm.) Gasper & V.A.O.Dittrich
- Blechnum francii Rosenst. = Oceaniopteris francii (Rosenst.) Gasper & Salino
- Blechnum fraseri (A.Cunn.) Luerss. = Diploblechnum fraseri (A.Cunn.) De Vol
- Blechnum fullagari (F.Muell.) C.Chr. = Cranfillia fullagari (T.C.Chambers & P.A.Farrant) Gasper & V.A.O.Dittrich
- Blechnum fuscosquamosum A.Rojas = Lomaridium fuscosquamosum (A.Rojas) Gasper & V.A.O.Dittrich

== G ==
- Blechnum gemmascens Alston = Parablechnum gemmascens (Alston) Gasper & Salino
- Blechnum geniculatum T.C.Chambers & P.A.Farrant = Cranfillia geniculata (T.C.Chambers & P.A.Farrant) Gasper & V.A.O.Dittrich
- Blechnum ghiesbreghtii (Baker) C.Chr. = Austroblechnum stoloniferum (Mett. ex E.Fourn.) Gasper & V.A.O.Dittrich
- Blechnum gibbum (Labill.) Mett. = Oceaniopteris gibba (Labill.) Gasper & Salino
- Blechnum glabrescens T.C.Chambers & Sykes = Cranfillia glabrescens (T.C.Chambers & Sykes) Gasper & V.A.O.Dittrich
- Blechnum glaziovii (Christ) Rolleri & Prada = Parablechnum glaziovii (Christ) Gasper & Salino
- Blechnum gregsonii (Watts) Tindale = Parablechnum gregsonii (Tindale) Gasper & Salino

== H ==
- Blechnum hancockii Hance = Struthiopteris hancockii (Hance) Tagawa
- Blechnum hieronymi Brause = Parablechnum hieronymi (Brause) Gasper & Salino
- Blechnum hindii (Tindale ex T.C.Chambers) Christenh. = Doodia hindii Tindale ex T.C.Chambers
- Blechnum hirsutum Rosenst. = Cranfillia hirsuta (Rosenst.) Gasper & V.A.O.Dittrich
- Blechnum howeanum T.C.Chambers & P.A.Farrant = Parablechnum howeanum (T.C.Chambers & P.A.Farrant) Gasper & Salino
- Blechnum humbertii Tardieu = Parablechnum marginatum (Fée) Gasper & Salino var. humbertii (Tardieu) Gasper & Salino

== I–K ==
- Blechnum inflexum (Kunze) Kuhn = Lomaria inflexa Kunze
- Blechnum insigne (Hook.) C.M.Kuo = Brainea insignis (Hook.) J.Sm.
- Blechnum integrifrons Bonap. ex Rakotondr. = Austroblechnum integrifrons (Bonap. ex Rakotondr.) Gasper & V.A.O.Dittrich
- Blechnum jamaicense C.Chr. = Austroblechnum jamaicense (Broadh.) Gasper & V.A.O.Dittrich
- Blechnum keysseri Rosenst. = Austroblechnum keysseri (Rosenst.) Gasper & V.A.O.Dittrich
- Blechnum kunthianum C. Chr. = Lomaridium angustifolium (Kunth.) Vicent & Gabriel y Galán

== L ==
- Blechnum lechleri Mett. = Austroblechnum lechleri (T.Moore) Gasper & V.A.O.Dittrich
- Blechnum lehmannii Hieron. = Austroblechnum lehmannii (Hieron.) Gasper & V.A.O.Dittrich
- Blechnum lenormandii (Baker) Diels = Diploblechnum lenormandii (Baker) Gasper & V.A.O.Dittrich
- Blechnum leyboldtianum C.Chr. = Austroblechnum leyboldtianum (Phil.) Gasper & V.A.O.Dittrich
- Blechnum lherminieri (Bory) Mett. = Austroblechnum lherminieri (Bory) Gasper & V.A.O.Dittrich
- Blechnum lima Rosenst. = Parablechnum lima (Rosenst.) Gasper & Salino
- Blechnum lineare (C.Moore & J.Sm.) Christenh. = Doodia linearis C.Moore ex J.Sm.
- Blechnum lineatum (Sw.) Hieron. = Parablechnum lineatum (Sw.) Gasper & Salino
- Blechnum longepetiolatum Tardieu = Lomariocycas longepetiolata (Tardieu) Gasper & A.R.Sm.
- Blechnum longicauda C.Chr. = Cranfillia longicauda (C.Chr.) Gasper & V.A.O.Dittrich
- Blechnum longipinna Rakotondr. = Lomariocycas longipinna (Rakotondr.) Gasper & A.R.Sm.
- Blechnum longistipitatum A.Rojas = Parablechnum longistipitatum (A.Rojas) comb. ined.
- Blechnum loxense (Kunth) Hook. ex Salomon = Parablechnum loxense (Kunth) Gasper & Salino
- Blechnum lyonii (O.Deg.) Christenh. = Doodia lyonii O.Deg.

== M ==
- Blechnum madagascariense Tardieu = Lomariocycas madagascariensis (Tardieu) Gasper & A.R.Sm.
- Blechnum magellanicum (Desv.) Mett. = Lomariocycas magellanica (Desv.) Gasper & A.R.Sm.
- Blechnum marginatum Kuhn = Parablechnum marginatum (Fée) Gasper & Salino
- Blechnum marquesense (E.D.Br.) Christenh. = Doodia marquesensis E.D.Br.
- Blechnum maximum (R.Br. ex C.Chr.) Christenh. = Doodia maxima (R.Br.) J.Sm.
- Blechnum maxonii C.Chr. = Austroblechnum lehmannii (Hieron.) Gasper & V.A.O.Dittrich
- Blechnum medium (R.Br.) Christenh. = Doodia media R.Br.
- Blechnum melanocaulon (Brack.) T.C.Chambers & P.A.Farrant = Austroblechnum melanocaulon (Brack.) Gasper & V.A.O.Dittrich
- Blechnum melanopus Hook. = Blechnidium melanopus (Hook.) T.Moore
- Blechnum membranaceum (Colenso) Mett. = Austroblechnum membranaceum (Colenso ex Hook.) Gasper & V.A.O.Dittrich
- Blechnum microphyllum (Goldm.) C.V.Morton = Austroblechnum microphyllum (Goldm.) Gasper & V.A.O.Dittrich
- Blechnum milnei (Carruth.) C.Chr. = Parablechnum milnei (Carruth.) Gasper & Salino
- Blechnum minus (R.Br.) Ettingsh. = Parablechnum minus (R.Br.) Gasper & Salino
- Blechnum mochaenum G.Kunkel = Austroblechnum lechleri (T.Moore) Gasper & V.A.O.Dittrich
- Blechnum molle (Parris) Christenh. = Doodia mollis Parris
- Blechnum monomorphum R.C.Moran & B.Øllg. = Parablechnum monomorphum (R.C.Moran & B. Øllg.) Gasper & Salino
- Blechnum montanum T.C.Chambers & P.A.Farrant = Parablechnum montanum (T.C.Chambers & P.A.Farrant) Gasper & Salino
- Blechnum moorei C.Chr. = Oceaniopteris ciliata (T.Moore) Gasper & Salino
- Blechnum moranianum A.Rojas = Parablechnum moranianum (A.Rojas) Gasper & Salino
- Blechnum moritzianum (Klotzsch) Hieron. = Lomariocycas moritziana (Klotzsch) Gabriel y Galán & Vicent

== N ==
- Blechnum neglectum (F.M.Bailey) R.K.Wilson & Bayly = Diploblechnum neglectum (F.M.Bailey) Gasper & V.A.O.Dittrich
- Blechnum neohollandicum Christenh. = Doodia aspera R.Br.
- Blechnum nesophilum T.C.Chambers & P.A.Farrant = Parablechnum nesophilum (T.C.Chambers & P.A.Farrant) Gasper & Salino
- Blechnum nigrocostatum A.Rojas = Lomaridium nigrocostatum (A.Rojas) Gasper & V.A.O.Dittrich
- Blechnum nigrum (Colenso) Mett. = Cranfillia nigra (Colenso) Gasper & V.A.O.Dittrich
- Blechnum norfolkianum (Heward) Maiden = Austroblechnum norfolkianum (Heward) Gasper & V.A.O.Dittrich
- Blechnum novae-zelandiae T.C.Chambers & P.A.Farrant = Parablechnum novae-zelandiae (T.C.Chambers & P.A.Farrant) Gasper & Salino
- Blechnum nudum (Labill.) Wakef. = Lomaria nuda (Labill.) Willd.
- Blechnum nukuhivense E.Brown = Austroblechnum nukuhivense (E.D.Br.) Gasper & V.A.O.Dittrich

== O ==
- Blechnum obtusatum (Labill.) Mett. = Oceaniopteris obtusata (Labill.) Gasper & Salino
- Blechnum obtusum R.C.Moran & A.R.Sm. = Parablechnum obtusum (R.C.Moran & A.R.Sm.) Gasper & Salino
- Blechnum oceanicum (Rosenst.) Brownlie = Lomaria oceanica (Rosenst.) Gasper & V.A.O.Dittrich
- Blechnum opacum Mett. = Cranfillia opaca (Mett.) Gasper & V.A.O.Dittrich
- Blechnum organense Brade = Austroblechnum organense (Brade) Gasper & V.A.O.Dittrich
- Blechnum orientale L. = Blechnopsis orientalis (L.) C.Presl

== P–Q ==
- Blechnum pacificum Lorence & A.R.Sm. = Parablechnum pacificum (Lorence & A.R.Sm.) Gasper & Salino
- Blechnum pallidum (Hook. & Arn.) Brack. = Sadleria pallida Hook. & Arn.
- Blechnum palmiforme (Thouars) C.Chr. = Lomariocycas palmiformis (Thouars) Gasper & A.R.Sm.
- Blechnum parrisiae Christenh. = Doodia australis (Parris) Parris
- Blechnum paschale (C.Chr.) Christenh. = Doodia paschalis C.Chr.
- Blechnum patersonii (R.Br.) Mett. = Austroblechnum patersonii (R.Br.) Gasper & V.A.O.Dittrich
- Blechnum pazense M.Kessler & A.R.Sm. = Parablechnum pazense (M.Kessler & A.R.Sm.) Gasper & Salino
- Blechnum penna-marina (Poir.) Kuhn = Austroblechnum penna-marina (Poir.) Gasper & V.A.O.Dittrich
- Blechnum petiolare C.Chr. = Austroblechnum lehmannii (Hieron.) Gasper & V.A.O.Dittrich
- Blechnum pilosum (Brack.) Brownlie = Cranfillia pilosa (Brack.) Gasper & V.A.O.Dittrich
- Blechnum pinnatifidum A.Rojas = Austroblechnum pinnatifidum (A.Rojas) Gasper & V.A.O.Dittrich
- Blechnum polinesicum Molinari = Doodia scaberula Parris
- Blechnum procerum (G.Forst.) Sw. = Parablechnum procerum (G.Forst.) C.Presl
- Blechnum proliferum Rosenst. = Parablechnum proliferum (Rosenst.) Gasper & Salino
- Blechnum pteropus (Kunze) Mett. = Lomaridium pteropus (Kunze) Gasper & V.A.O.Dittrich
- Blechnum puniceum T.C.Chambers, P.J.Edwards & R.J.Johns = Parablechnum puniceum (T.C.Chambers, P.J.Edwards & R.J.Johns) Gasper & Salino

== R ==
- Blechnum raiateense J.W.Moore = Austroblechnum raiateense (J.W.Moore) Gasper & V.A.O.Dittrich
- Blechnum reflexum Rosenst. ex M.Kessler & A.R.Sm. = Parablechnum reflexum (Rosenst. ex M.Kessler & A.R.Sm.) Gasper & Salino
- Blechnum repens M.Kessler & A.R.Sm. = Parablechnum repens (M.Kessler & A.R.Sm.) Gasper & Salino
- Blechnum reticulatum R.K.Wilson & Bayly = Diploblechnum acuminatum (C.T.White & Goy) Gasper & V.A.O.Dittrich
- Blechnum revolutum (Alderw.) C.Chr. = Parablechnum revolutum (Alderw.) Gasper & Salino
- Blechnum rheophyticum R.C.Moran = Parablechnum rheophyticum (R.C.Moran) Gasper & Salino
- Blechnum rimbachii C.Chr. = Austroblechnum divergens (Kunze) Gasper & V.A.O.Dittrich
- Blechnum × rodriguezii S.Aguiar, L.G.Quintan. & Amigo = Austroblechnum × rodriguezii (Aguiar, L.G.Quintan. & Amigo) Gasper & V.A.O.Dittrich
- Blechnum rosenstockii Copel. = Diploblechnum rosenstockii (Copel.) Gasper & V.A.O.Dittrich
- Blechnum rufum (Spreng.) C.Chr. = Lomariocycas rufa (Spreng.) Gasper & A.R.Sm.
- Blechnum ryanii (Kaulf.) Hieron. = Parablechnum ryanii (Kaulf.) Gasper & Salino

== S ==
- Blechnum sampaioanum Brade = Cranfillia sampaioana (Brade) Gasper & V.A.O.Dittrich
- Blechnum schiedeanum (Schltdl. ex C.Presl) Hieron. = Parablechnum schiedeanum (Schltdl. ex C.Presl) Gasper & Salino
- Blechnum schomburgkii (Klotzsch) C.Chr. = Lomariocycas schomburgkii (Klotzsch) Gasper & A.R.Sm.
- Blechnum schottii (Colla) C.Chr. = Lomaridium schottii (Colla) Gasper & V.A.O.Dittrich
- Blechnum sessilifolium (Klotzsch ex Christ) C.Chr. = Parablechnum sessilifolium (Klotzsch ex Christ) Gasper & Salino
- Blechnum shaferi (Broadh.) C.Chr. = Lomariocycas shaferi (Broadh.) Gasper & A.R.Sm.
- Blechnum smilodon M.Kessler & Lehnert = Parablechnum smilodon (M.Kessler & Lehnert) Gasper & Salino
- Blechnum spannagelii Rosenst. = Lomaria spannagelii (Rosenst.) Gasper & V.A.O.Dittrich
- Blechnum spicant (L.) Roth = Struthiopteris spicant (L.) Weiss
- Blechnum spinulosum Poir. = Doodia caudata (Cav.) R.Br.
- Blechnum sprucei C.Chr. = Cranfillia caudata (Baker) V.A.O.Dittrich & Gasper
- Blechnum squamatum M.Kessler & A.R.Sm. = Parablechnum squamatum (M.Kessler & A.R.Sm.) Gasper & Salino
- Blechnum squamipes (Hieron.) M.Kessler & A.R.Sm. = Austroblechnum squamipes (Hieron.) Gasper & V.A.O.Dittrich
- Blechnum squamosissimum A.Rojas = Parablechnum squamosissimum (A.Rojas) Gasper & Salino
- Blechnum squarrosum Gaudich. = Doodia squarrosa Colenso
- Blechnum stipitellatum (Sodiro) C.Chr. = Parablechnum stipitellatum (Sodiro) Gasper & Salino
- Blechnum stuebelii Hieron. = Parablechnum stuebelii (Hieron.) Gasper & Salino
- Blechnum subcordatum (E.Fourn.) Brownlie = Parablechnum subcordatum (E.Fourn.) Gasper & Salino

== T–V ==
- Blechnum tabulare (Thunb.) Kuhn = Lomariocycas tabularis (Thunb.) Gasper & A.R.Sm.
- Blechnum triangularifolium T.C.Chambers & P.A.Farrant = Parablechnum triangularifolium (T.C.Chambers & P.A.Farrant) Gasper & Salino
- Blechnum tuerckheimii Brause = Parablechnum tuerckheimii (Brause) Gasper & Salino
- Blechnum underwoodianum (Broadh.) C.Chr. = Lomariocycas insularis (C.V.Morton & Lellinger) Gasper & A.R.Sm.
- Blechnum unisorum (Baker) Christenh. = Sadleria unisora (Baker) Rob.
- Blechnum usterianum (Christ) C.Chr. = Parablechnum usterianum (Christ) Gasper & Salino
- Blechnum vallegrandense M.Kessler & A.R.Sm. = Austroblechnum vallegrandense (M.Kessler & A.R.Sm.) Gasper & V.A.O.Dittrich
- Blechnum venosum Copel. = Parablechnum venosum (Copel.) Gasper & Salino
- Blechnum vestitum (Blume) Kuhn = Parablechnum vestitum (Blume) Gasper & Salino
- Blechnum vieillardii Mett. = Austroblechnum vieillardii (Mett.) Gasper & V.A.O.Dittrich
- Blechnum vittatum Brack. = Oceaniopteris vittata (Brack.) Gasper & Salino
- Blechnum vulcanicum (Blume) Kuhn = Cranfillia vulcanica (Blume) Gasper & V.A.O.Dittrich
- Blechnum wagnerianum (D.D.Palmer & T.Flynn) Christenh. = Sadleria wagneriana D.D.Palmer & Flynn

== W–Z ==
- Blechnum wardiae Mickel & Beitel = Austroblechnum wardiae (Mickel & Beitel) Gasper & V.A.O.Dittrich
- Blechnum wattsii Tindale = Parablechnum wattsii (Tindale) Gasper & Salino
- Blechnum werckleanum (Christ) C.Chr. = Lomariocycas werckleana (Christ) Gasper & A.R.Sm.
- Blechnum werffii R.C.Moran = Parablechnum werffii (R.C.Moran) Gasper & Salino
- Blechnum whelanii F.M.Bailey = Oceaniopteris whelanii (F.M.Bailey) Gasper & Salino
- Blechnum wolamense Cuf. = Lomariocycas tabularis (Thunb.) Gasper & A.R.Sm.
- Blechnum wurunuran Parris = Parablechnum wurunuran (Parris) Gasper & Salino
- Blechnum xiphophyllum (Baker) C.Chr. = Lomaridium xiphophyllum (Baker) Gasper & V.A.O.Dittrich
- Blechnum zeelandicum Christenh. = Doodia squarrosa Colenso
