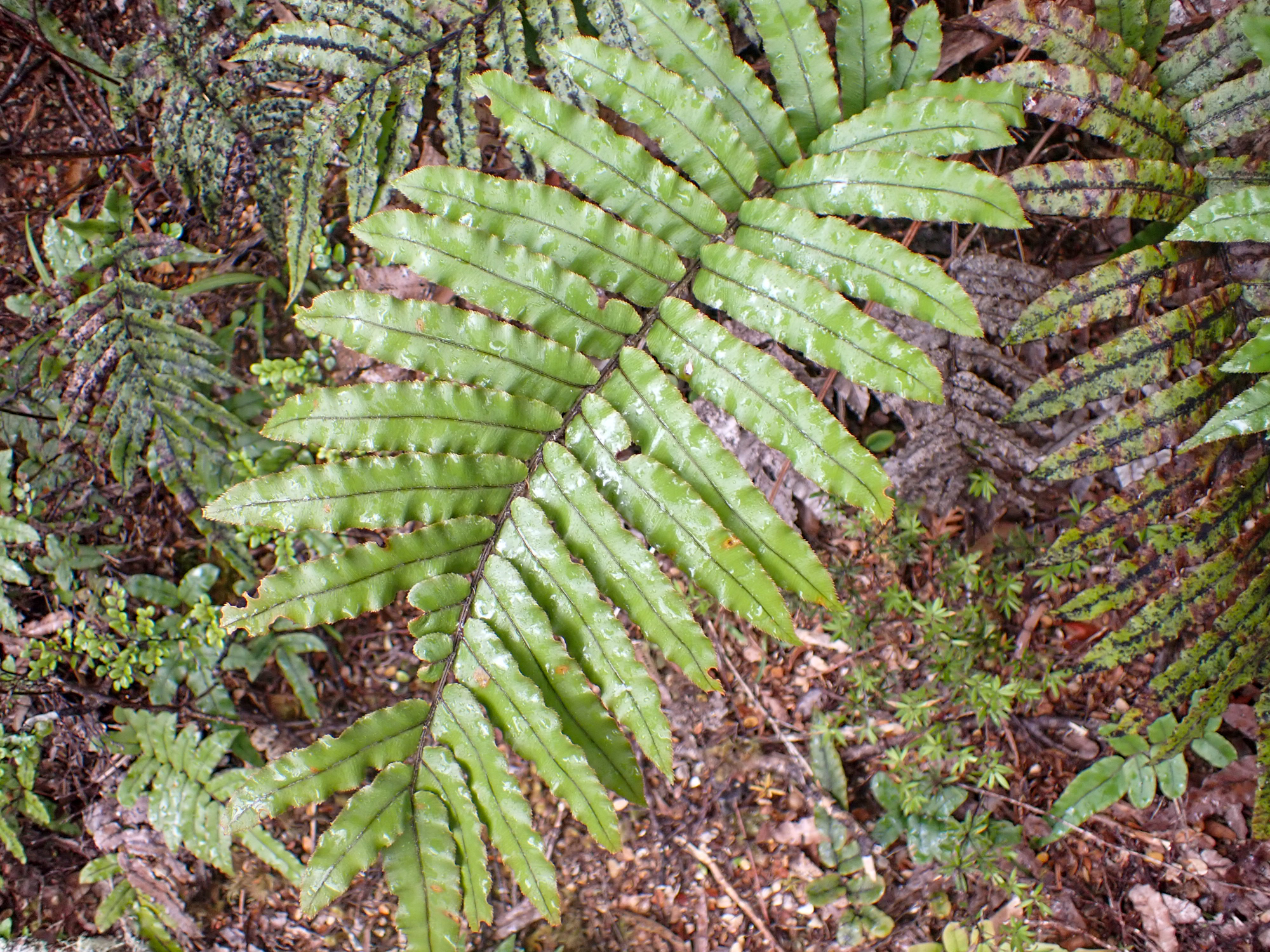
- Blechnum montanum in Nelson Lakes National Park

Conservation status
- Not Threatened (NZ TCS)

Scientific classification
- Kingdom: Plantae
- Clade: Tracheophytes
- Division: Polypodiophyta
- Class: Polypodiopsida
- Order: Polypodiales
- Suborder: Aspleniineae
- Family: Blechnaceae
- Genus: Blechnum
- Species: B. montanum

Binomial name
- Blechnum montanum T.C.Chambers & P.A.Farrant

= Blechnum montanum =

Species of fern

Blechnum montanum, or mountain kiokio, is a species of fern, endemic to New Zealand.

== Description ==
A large fern, B. montanum has scaly rhizomes that can be up to 20cm long, and strongly dimorphic fronds.

== Range ==
This species is found in the North and South Island of New Zealand, as well as the outlying subantarctic islands of the Auckland, Campbell, and Antipodes Islands, along with the Chatham Islands. North of Auckland, only hybrids with B. novae-zelandiae may be present.

== Habitat ==
On the North Island, B. montanum lives in alpine and subalpine habitats. In the South Island and on the outlying islands of New Zealand, it can be found in more diverse habitats.

== Etymology ==
Montanum comes from its montane and subalpine habitat, from the Latin montanus, for 'mountain'.

== Taxonomy ==
This species is sometimes considered part of Parablechnum.
