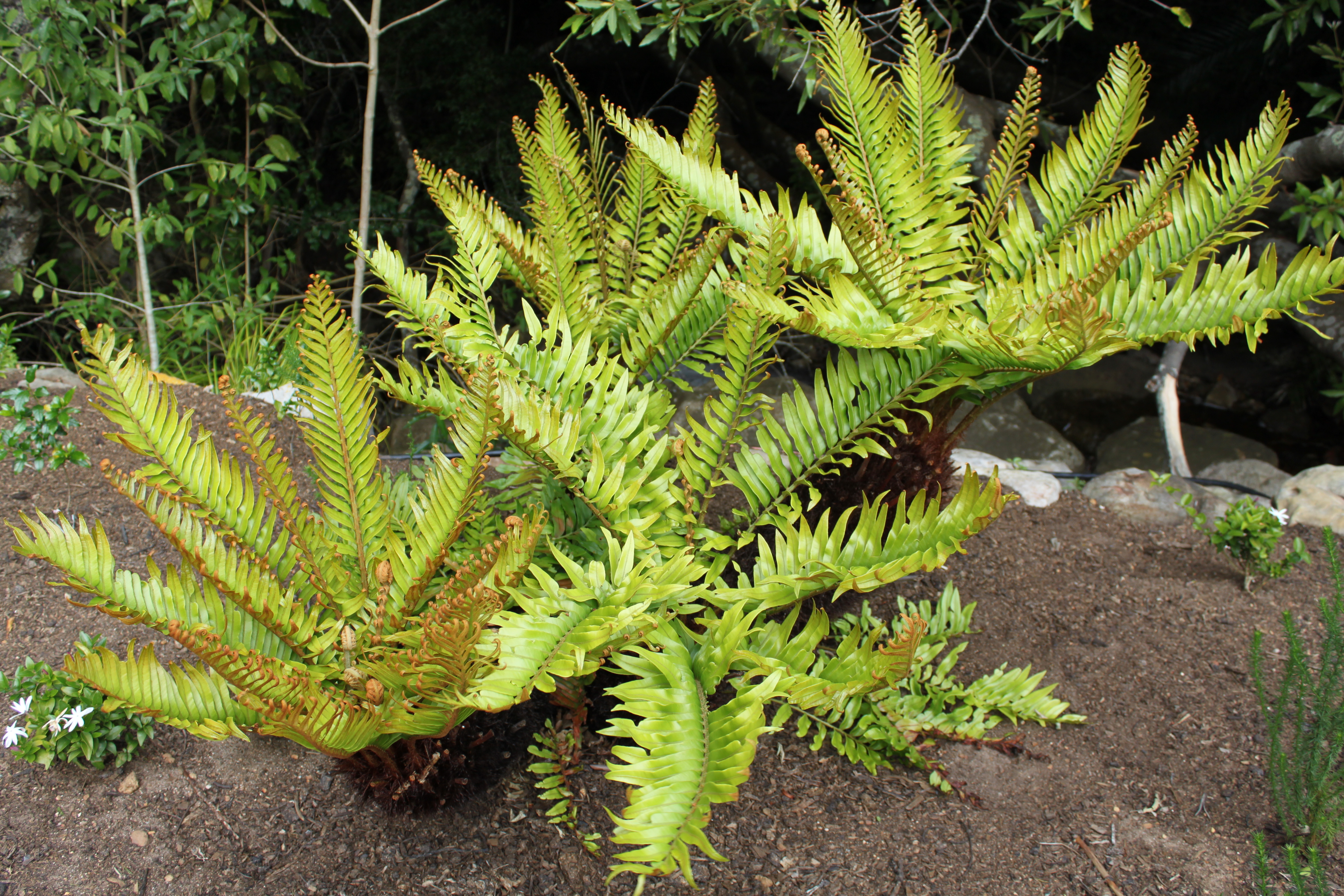
- Lomariocycas tabularis in cultivation

Scientific classification
- Kingdom: Plantae
- Clade: Tracheophytes
- Division: Polypodiophyta
- Class: Polypodiopsida
- Order: Polypodiales
- Suborder: Aspleniineae
- Family: Blechnaceae
- Subfamily: Blechnoideae
- Genus: Lomariocycas (J.Sm.) Gasper & A.R.Sm.

Species
- See text.

= Lomariocycas =

Genus of ferns

Lomariocycas is a genus of ferns in the family Blechnaceae, subfamily Blechnoideae, according to the Pteridophyte Phylogeny Group classification of 2016 (PPG I). The genus is accepted in a 2016 classification of the family Blechnaceae, but other sources sink it into a very broadly defined Blechnum, equivalent to the whole of the PPG I subfamily.

== Species ==
As of July 2025, using the PPG I classification system, the Checklist of Ferns and Lycophytes of the World accepted the following seventeen species:

- Lomariocycas aurata (Fée) Gasper & A.R.Sm.
- Lomariocycas columbiensis (Hieron.) Gasper & A.R.Sm.
- Lomariocycas cycadifolia (Colla) Gasper & A.R.Sm.
- Lomariocycas decrescens (Rakotondr.) Gasper & A.R.Sm.
- Lomariocycas longepetiolata (Tardieu) Gasper & A.R.Sm.
- Lomariocycas longipinna (Rakotondr.) Gasper & A.R.Sm.
- Lomariocycas madagascariensis (Tardieu) Gasper & A.R.Sm.
- Lomariocycas magellanica (Desv.) Gasper & A.R.Sm.
- Lomariocycas moritziana (Klotzsch) Gabriel y Galán & Vicent
- Lomariocycas obtusifolia (Ettingsh.) Gasper & A.R.Sm.
- Lomariocycas palmiformis (Thouars) Gasper & A.R.Sm.
- Lomariocycas rufa (Spreng.) Gasper & A.R.Sm.
- Lomariocycas schomburgkii (Klotzsch) Gasper & A.R.Sm.
- Lomariocycas shaferi (Broadh.) Gasper & A.R.Sm.
- Lomariocycas tabularis (Thunb.) Gasper & A.R.Sm.
- Lomariocycas underwoodiana (Broadh.) Gasper & A.R.Sm.
- Lomariocycas werckleana (Christ) Gasper & A.R.Sm.
