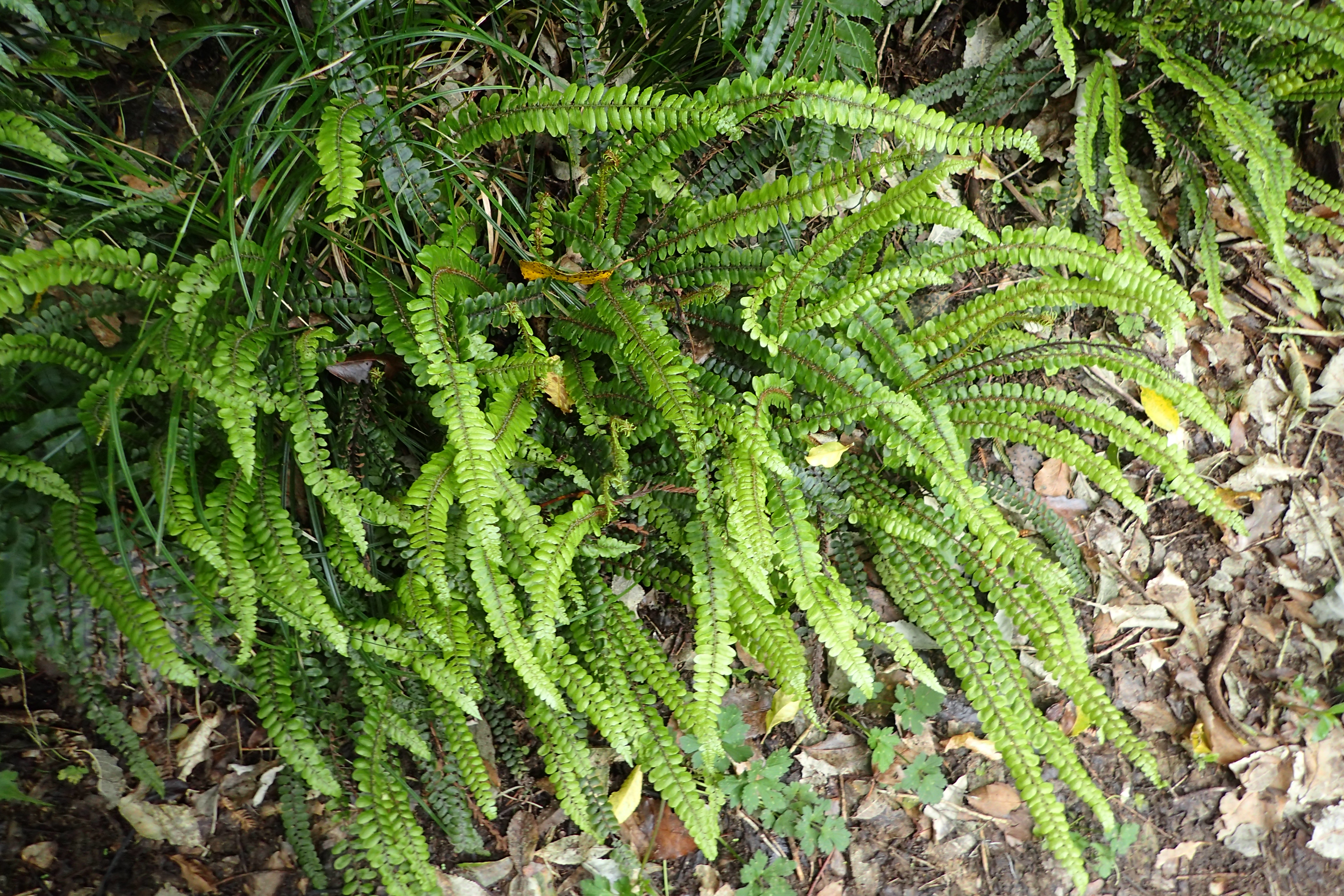
- Cranfillia fluviatilis, Hawkes's Bay, New Zealand

Scientific classification
- Kingdom: Plantae
- Clade: Tracheophytes
- Division: Polypodiophyta
- Class: Polypodiopsida
- Order: Polypodiales
- Suborder: Aspleniineae
- Family: Blechnaceae
- Subfamily: Blechnoideae
- Genus: Cranfillia; Gasper & V.A.O.Dittrich

Species
- See text.

= Cranfillia =

Genus of ferns

Cranfillia is a genus of ferns in the family Blechnaceae, subfamily Blechnoideae, according to the Pteridophyte Phylogeny Group classification of 2016 (PPG I). The genus is accepted in a 2016 classification of the family Blechnaceae, but other sources sink it into a very broadly defined Blechnum, equivalent to the whole of the PPG I subfamily.

== Species ==
As of July 2025, World Ferns accepted the following twenty-three species:

- Cranfillia aequabilis (T.C.Chambers) Parris & de Lange
- Cranfillia bakeri (C.Chr.) Vázq.Ferr. & S.Molino
- Cranfillia caudata (Baker) V.A.O.Dittrich & Gasper
- Cranfillia deltoides (Colenso) de Lange & Parris
- Cranfillia deplanchei (Baker) Vázq.Ferr. & G.Y
- Cranfillia feani (E.D.Br.) Parris & de Lange
- Cranfillia fluviatilis (R.Br.) Gasper & V.A.O.Dittrich
- Cranfillia fullagari (T.C.Chambers & P.A.Farrant) Gasper & V.A.O.Dittrich
- Cranfillia geniculata (T.C.Chambers & P.A.Farrant) Gasper & V.A.O.Dittrich
- Cranfillia glabrescens (T.C.Chambers & Sykes) Gasper & V.A.O.Dittrich
- Cranfillia hirsuta (Rosenst.) Gasper & V.A.O.Dittrich
- Cranfillia humilis (T.C.Chambers) de Lange & Parris
- Cranfillia longicauda (C.Chr.) Gasper & V.A.O.Dittrich
- Cranfillia megavulcanica (T.C.Chambers) Parris & de Lange
- Cranfillia nigra (Colenso) Gasper & V.A.O.Dittrich
- Cranfillia nukuhivensis (E.Brown) de Lange & Parris
- Cranfillia opaca (Mett.) Gasper & V.A.O.Dittrich
- Cranfillia phanerophlebia (C.Chr.) de Lange & Parris
- Cranfillia pilosa (Brack.) Gasper & V.A.O.Dittrich
- Cranfillia sampaioana (Brade) Gasper & V.A.O.Dittrich
- Cranfillia tovii (E.D.Br.) de Lange & Parris
- Cranfillia venosa (Copel.) Parris & de Lange
- Cranfillia vulcanica (Blume) Gasper & V.A.O.Dittrich
