= Blechnum petiolare =

Conservation status
- Data Deficient (IUCN 3.1)

Scientific classification
- Kingdom: Plantae
- Clade: Tracheophytes
- Division: Polypodiophyta
- Class: Polypodiopsida
- Order: Polypodiales
- Suborder: Aspleniineae
- Family: Blechnaceae
- Genus: Blechnum
- Species: B. petiolare

Binomial name
- Blechnum petiolare (Sodiro) C.Chr.

Species of fern

Blechnum petiolare is a species of fern in the family Blechnaceae. It is endemic to Ecuador and known only from Bolívar Province. When it was first described in the early 20th century, it was known from Chillanes but this area has been heavily disturbed and the species continues to be threatened.

Its natural habitat is subtropical or tropical moist montane forests. It is threatened by habitat loss for fires and deforestation including agriculture.

The Checklist of Ferns and Lycophytes of the World regards it as a possible synonym of Austroblechnum lehmannii.
