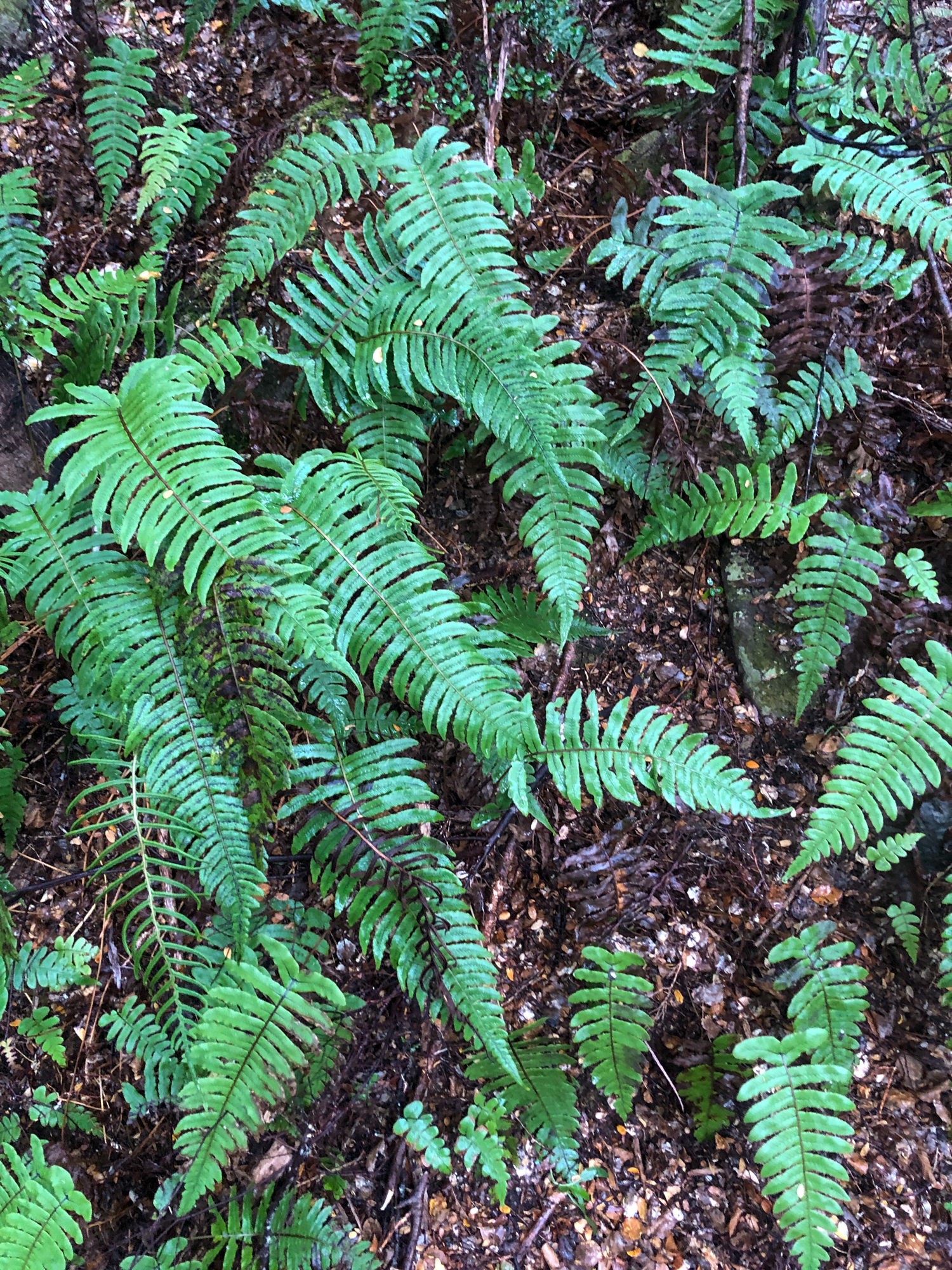
- Cranfillia deltoides in Nelson Lakes National Park

Conservation status
- Not Threatened (NZ TCS)

Scientific classification
- Kingdom: Plantae
- Clade: Embryophytes
- Clade: Tracheophytes
- Division: Polypodiophyta
- Class: Polypodiopsida
- Order: Polypodiales
- Suborder: Aspleniineae
- Family: Blechnaceae
- Genus: Cranfillia
- Species: C. deltoides

Binomial name
- Cranfillia deltoides (Colenso) de Lange & Parris

= Cranfillia deltoides =

Species of flowering plant

Cranfillia deltoides, also called mountain hard fern, kiokio, or korokio, is a species of fern, native to New Zealand and Australia.

== Description ==
A medium-sized green fern.

The low growth habit, narrow and triangular sterile fronds, and the deflexed basal pinnae separate this species from others. Also, the basal pinna segments are only slightly reduced.

== Distribution and habitat ==
Cranfillia deltoides is known from all three major islands of New Zealand, as well as the Chatham Islands. It is also found in southeast Australia. It is rare north of Auckland.

It can be found on steep banks, such as on cliff faces or roadsides, and occasionally also near water such as on streamsides. It grows from the coast to montane areas, and is more common above 200m in elevation.

== Ecology ==
Cranfillia deltoides is often found in podocarp, beech, and mānuka and kānuka forests. It can sometimes grow as a low epiphyte (growing on another plant).

== Etymology ==
Deltoides is derived from the Greek word for Delta (letter), and refers to the triangular shape of the letter.

== Taxonomy ==
The taxonomy is unsettled for the Blechnum and Cranfillia ferns in Oceania. This fern is sometimes referred to in the literature as Blechnum deltoides (Colenso) T.C.Chambers, based on Lomaria deltoides Colenso.
