= Austroblechnum divergens =

Scientific classification
- Kingdom: Plantae
- Clade: Tracheophytes
- Division: Polypodiophyta
- Class: Polypodiopsida
- Order: Polypodiales
- Suborder: Aspleniineae
- Family: Blechnaceae
- Genus: Austroblechnum
- Species: A. divergens

Binomial name
- Austroblechnum divergens (Kunze) Gasper & V.A.O.Dittrich

Synonyms
- Acrostichum heterophyllum Raddi; Blechnum divergens (Kunze) Mett.; Blechnum exaltatum (Fée) Duek; Blechnum floresii (Sodiro) C.Chr.; Blechnum plumieri var. divergens (Kunze) Luetzelb.; Blechnum rimbachii (Sodiro) C.Chr.; Lomaria divergens Kunze; Lomaria exaltata Fée; Lomaria floresii Sodiro; Lomaria lherminieri var. exaltata (Fée & L'Herm.) Krug; Lomaria rimbachii Sodiro; Struthiopteris exaltata (Fée) Broadh.

Species of fern

Austroblechnum divergens, synonyms including Blechnum divergens, Blechnum rimbachii and Blechnum floresii, is a species of fern in the family Blechnaceae.

Austroblechnum divergens in its broader circumscription is native from Mexico to southern Brazil.

Some sources treat the taxon known by the synonym Blechnum rimbachii as a distinct species; if so, it is endemic to Azuay Province, Ecuador (found 2,000 m above sea level), and is only known from an early 20th century collection. Its natural habitat is subtropical or tropical moist montane forests. It is threatened by habitat loss for agriculture.

Similarly, the synonym Blechnum floresii is regarded as representing a separate species by some sources. If so, it is endemic to Ecuador, where it is known from only two locations in Pichincha Province. It grows in coastal forest habitat and the forests of the low Andes. It is threatened by habitat loss.
