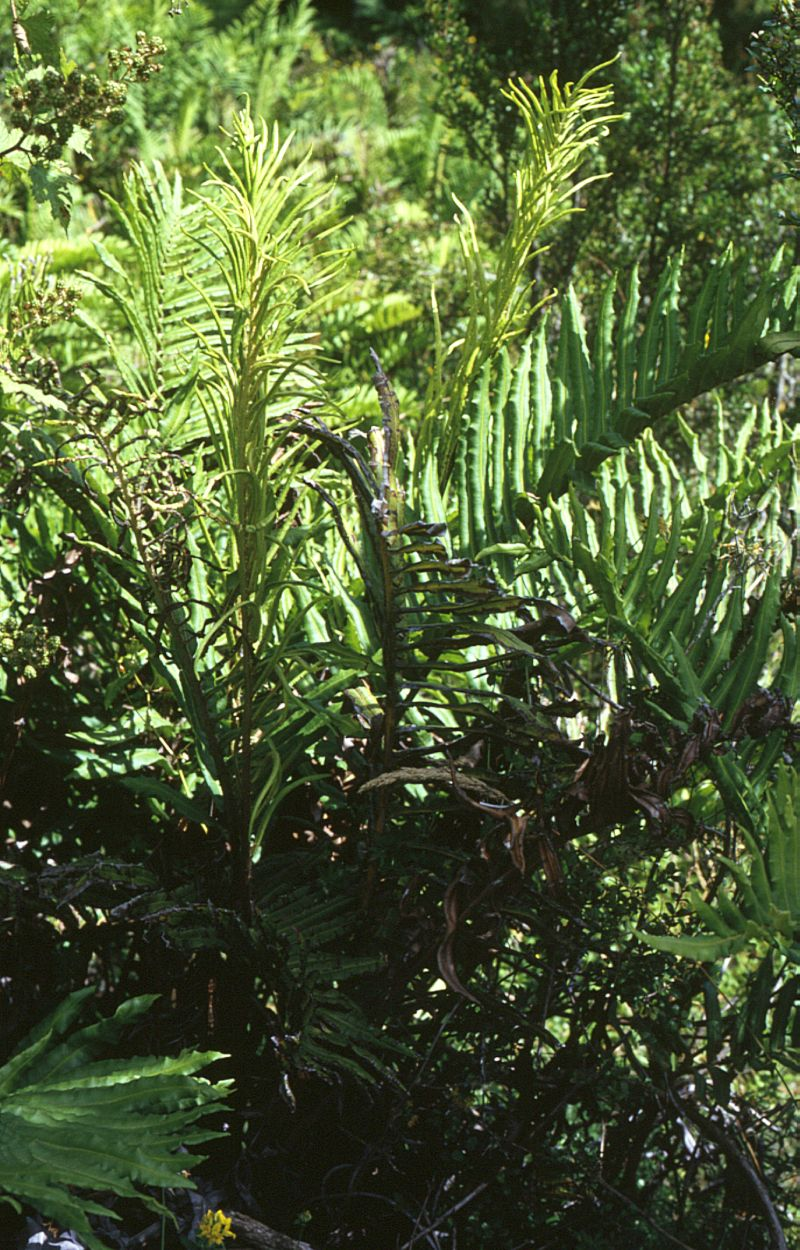

Scientific classification
- Kingdom: Plantae
- Clade: Tracheophytes
- Division: Polypodiophyta
- Class: Polypodiopsida
- Order: Polypodiales
- Suborder: Aspleniineae
- Family: Blechnaceae
- Genus: Parablechnum
- Species: P. cordatum

Binomial name
- Parablechnum cordatum (Desv.) Gasper & Salino

Synonyms
- Blechnum cordatum (Desv.) Hieron.; Blechnum arborescens (Klotzsch & H.Karst.) Hieron; Blechnum capense var.ornifolium (C.Presl) Domin; Blechnum chilense (Kaulf.) Mett.; Blechnum euraddianum Brade; Blechnum gilliesii (Hook.& Grev.) Mett.; Blechnum itatiaiense Brade; Blechnum macahense Brade; Blechnum ornifolium (C.Presl) Ettingsh.; Blechnum peruvianum Hieron.; Blechnum raddianum Rosenst.; Blechnum reedii (Phil.) Espinosa; Blechnum regnellianum (Kunze) C.Chr.; Blechnum simile Sehnem; Lomaria arborescens Klotzsch & H.Karst.; Lomaria brasiliensis Raddi; Lomaria chilensis Kaulf.; Lomaria cordata Desv.; Lomaria gilliesii Hook.& Grev.; Lomaria ornifolia C.Presl; Lomaria reedii Phil.; Lomaria regnelliana Kunze; Lomaria serrulosa Desv.; Lomaria spissa Christ; Orthogramma gilliesii (Hook.& Grev.) C.Presl; Parablechnum chilense (Kaulf.) Gasper & Salino; Spicanta capensis var.gilliesii (Hook.& Grev.) Kuntze; Spicanta capensis var.lechleri (Mett.) Kuntze; Struthiopteris brasiliensis (Raddi) Maxon & Morton; Struthiopteris gilliesii (Hook.& Grev.) Ching

= Parablechnum cordatum =

Species of fern

Parablechnum cordatum (synonyms Blechnum cordatum, Blechnum chilense), the Chilean hard fern or costilla de vaca (Chilean Spanish for "cow's rib"), is a fern of the family Blechnaceae, native to Chile. It is also found in neighboring areas of Argentina and the Juan Fernández Islands.

It grows to 0.9–1.8 m (2 ft 11 in – 5 ft 11 in), often developing a trunk-like appearance over time. The fertile fronds are more erect, with narrower pinnae, than the infertile ones.

This plant has gained the Royal Horticultural Society's Award of Garden Merit.

== Sources ==
- (in Spanish) Florachilena.cl
