= Lomariocycas aurata =

Scientific classification
- Kingdom: Plantae
- Clade: Tracheophytes
- Division: Polypodiophyta
- Class: Polypodiopsida
- Order: Polypodiales
- Suborder: Aspleniineae
- Family: Blechnaceae
- Genus: Lomariocycas
- Species: L. aurata

Binomial name
- Lomariocycas aurata (Fée) Gasper & A.R.Sm.

Synonyms
- Blechnum auratum (Fée) R.M.Tryon & Stolze; Lomaria aurata Fée

Species of fern

Lomariocycas aurata (syn. Blechnum auratum) is a tree fern in the family Blechnaceae and found in montane rainforests and cloud forests from Costa Rica to Bolivia. The trunk, about 15 cm (5.9 in) thick, stands up to 2 m (6 ft 7 in) height. The once-pinnate fronds are about 1 m (3 ft 3 in) long.
