= Austroblechnum lehmannii =

Scientific classification
- Kingdom: Plantae
- Clade: Tracheophytes
- Division: Polypodiophyta
- Class: Polypodiopsida
- Order: Polypodiales
- Suborder: Aspleniineae
- Family: Blechnaceae
- Genus: Austroblechnum
- Species: A. lehmannii

Binomial name
- Austroblechnum lehmannii (Hieron.) Gasper & V.A.O.Dittrich

Synonyms
- Blechnum lehmannii Hieron.; Blechnum lherminieri subsp. lehmannii (Hieron.) Lellinger; Blechnum maxonii (Broadh.) C.Chr.; Blechnum mexiae Copel.; Blechnum microlomaria L.D.Gómez; Lomaria lanceolata Colla; Struthiopteris maxonii Broadh.; Struthiopteris mexiae (Copel.) Ching; Possible synonyms: Blechnum petiolare (Sodiro) C.Chr.; Lomaria petiolaris Sodiro

Species of fern

Austroblechnum lehmannii is a species of fern in the family Blechnaceae. It is native to Mexico (Southeast Mexico and Southwest Mexico), Central America (Costa Rica, El Salvador, Guatemala, Nicaragua and Panama), South America (Bolivia, South Brazil, Southeast Brazil, Colombia, mainland Ecuador, Guyana, Peru and Venezuela) and the Galápagos Islands.

The Checklist of Ferns and Lycophytes of the World regards Blechnum petiolare as a possible synonym; other sources treat it as a separate species.
