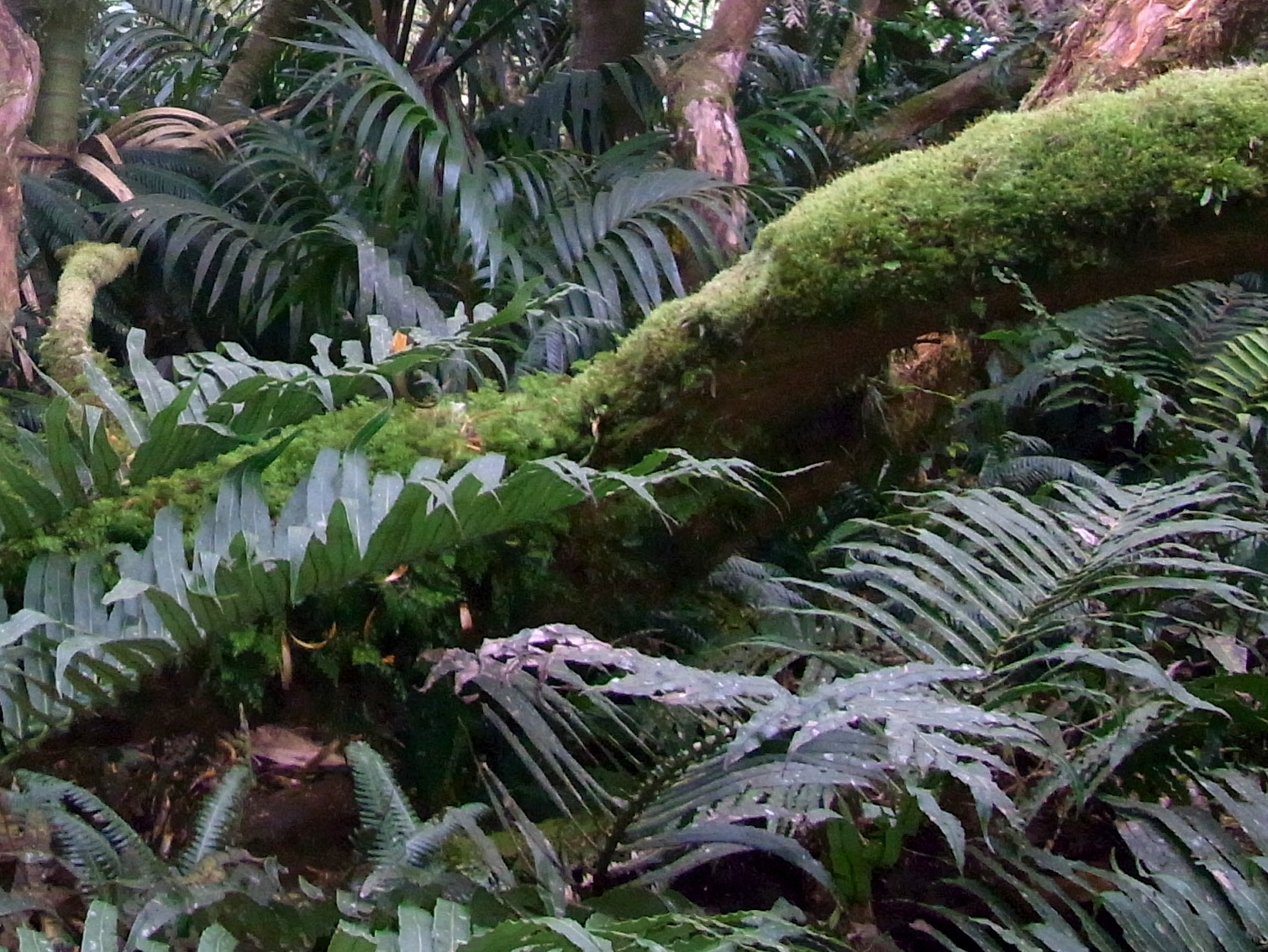

Scientific classification
- Kingdom: Plantae
- Clade: Tracheophytes
- Division: Polypodiophyta
- Class: Polypodiopsida
- Order: Polypodiales
- Suborder: Aspleniineae
- Family: Blechnaceae
- Genus: Cranfillia
- Species: C. fullagari

Binomial name
- Cranfillia fullagari (F.Muell.) Gasper & V.A.O.Dittrich

Synonyms
- Blechnum fullagari (F.Muell.) C.Chr. (orth. var.); Blechnum fullagarii (F.Muell.) C.Chr.; Lomaria auriculata Baker; Lomaria fullagari F.Muell.; Spicanta auriculata (Baker) Kuntze

= Cranfillia fullagari =

Species of fern

Cranfillia fullagari, synonym Blechnum fullagarii, is a fern in the family Blechnaceae. The specific epithet honours James Fullagar, who collected plants on Lord Howe Island for the Royal Botanic Gardens, Melbourne.

== Description ==
The plant is a terrestrial or lithophytic fern. The prominent rhizome has narrow and twisted apical scales. Its fronds are 30–50 cm long and 8–14 cm wide.

== Taxonomy ==
The species was first described in 1874 by Ferdinand von Mueller in the genus Lomaria. Although Mueller spelt the name Lomaria fullageri, using an e in the epithet, he referred to the surname "Fullagar". In 1905, Carl Christensen transferred the species to Blechnum, spelling the epithet fullagari. The spelling fullagarii is found in some sources; Article 60.8 of the International Code of Nomenclature for algae, fungi, and plants only allows the use of a single "i" with names ending in "er" not "ar". In 2016, André Luís de Gasper and Vinícius Antonio de Oliveira Dittrich transferred the species to Cranfillia as Cranfillia fullagari.

== Distribution and habitat ==
The fern is endemic to Australia's subtropical Lord Howe Island in the Tasman Sea. It is restricted to the cloud forest on the summit of Mount Gower.
