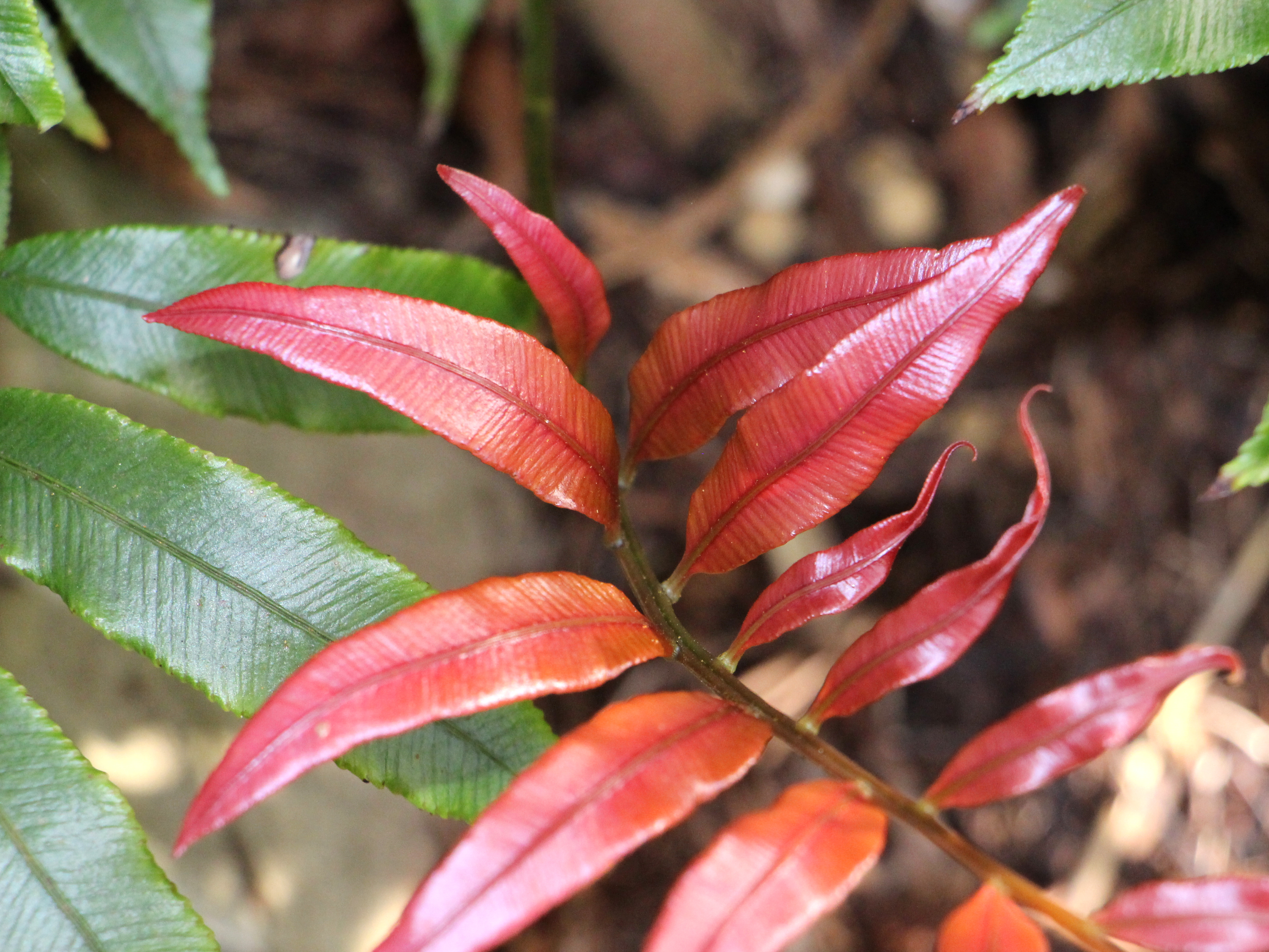

Scientific classification
- Kingdom: Plantae
- Clade: Tracheophytes
- Division: Polypodiophyta
- Class: Polypodiopsida
- Order: Polypodiales
- Suborder: Aspleniineae
- Family: Blechnaceae
- Genus: Parablechnum
- Species: P. articulatum

Binomial name
- Parablechnum articulatum (F.Muell.) Gasper & Salino

Synonyms
- Blechnum articulatum (F.Muell.) S.B.Andrews; Lomaria articulata F.Muell.

= Parablechnum articulatum =

Rosy water fern

Species of fern

Parablechnum articulatum, synonym Blechnum articulatum, is a species of fern in the family Blechnaceae. The common name is rosy water fern. Often seen growing on wet stream banks, at higher altitudes in tropical Queensland, Australia.
