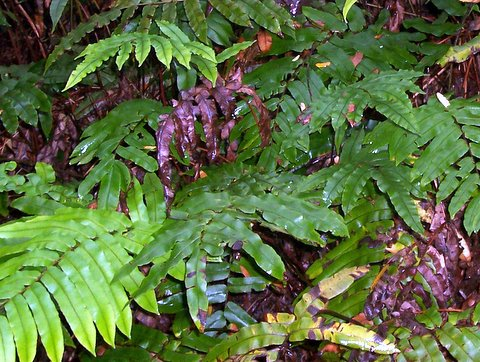
- Deua National Park, Australia

Scientific classification
- Kingdom: Plantae
- Clade: Tracheophytes
- Division: Polypodiophyta
- Class: Polypodiopsida
- Order: Polypodiales
- Suborder: Aspleniineae
- Family: Blechnaceae
- Genus: Parablechnum
- Species: P. wattsii

Binomial name
- Parablechnum wattsii (Tindale) Gasper & Salino

Synonyms
- Blechnum wattsii Tindale; Blechnum capense var. vestitum (Blume) Domin

= Parablechnum wattsii =

Hard water fern

Species of plant

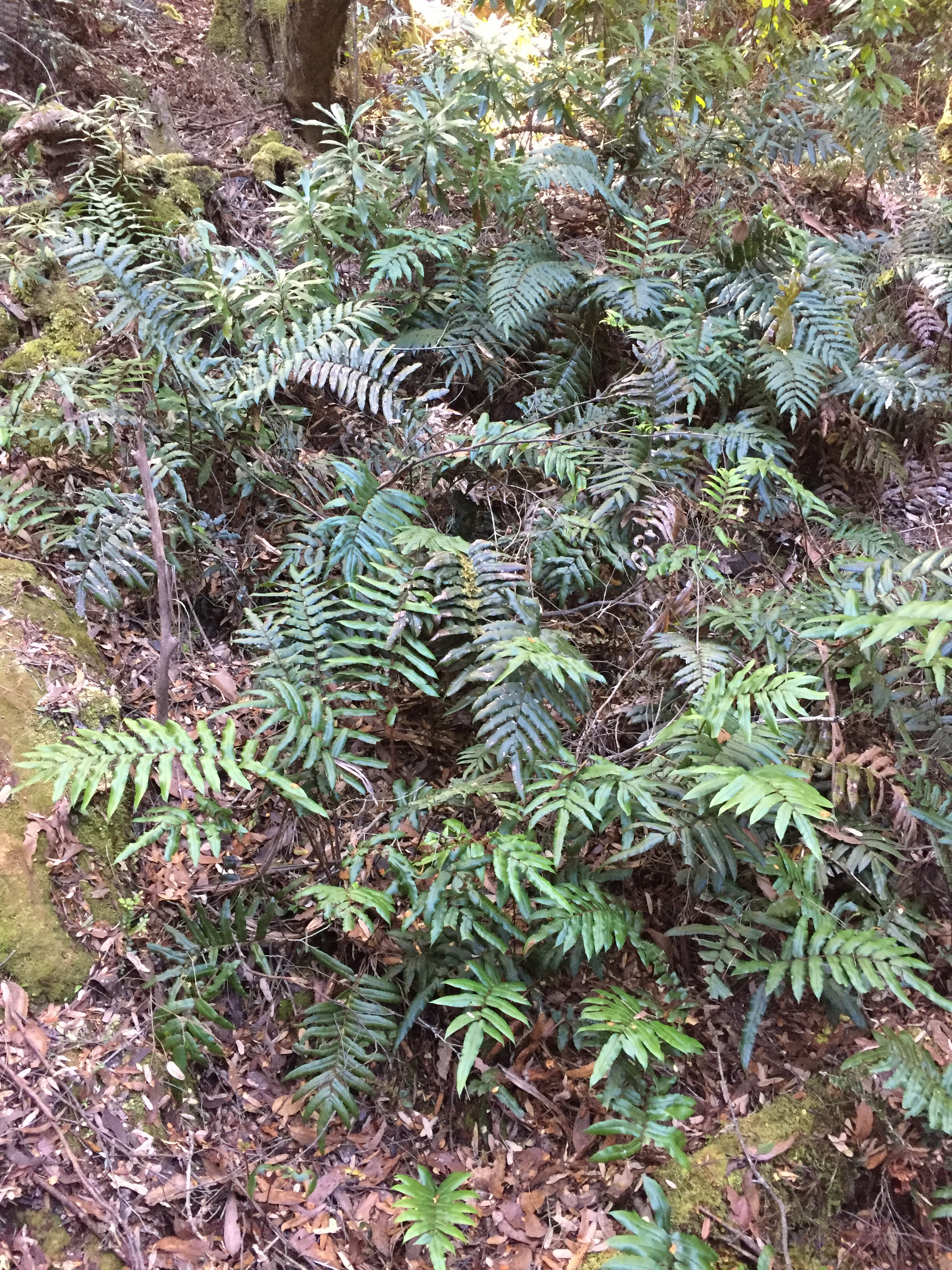
Cluster along the Huon Pine walk near Tahune AirWalk, Australia

Parablechnum wattsii, synonym Blechnum wattsii, is a common terrestrial fern growing in rainforest and open forest. It is often seen near creeks in much of south eastern Australia, including Victoria, Tasmania (and King Island), South Australia, New South Wales and Queensland. The specific epithet wattsii honours William Walter Watts (1856-1920). Watts was considered an authority on mosses and ferns and has more than 30 species named for him. Common names by which the species may be called are hard water fern - from its stiff leathery fronds, leech fern - as forest workers often encounter leaches while working in clusters of these ferns, hard hill fern - from the fern's habit and habitat, and red cabbage fern - from the bronze-pink colour of the young fronds resembling cooked red cabbage.

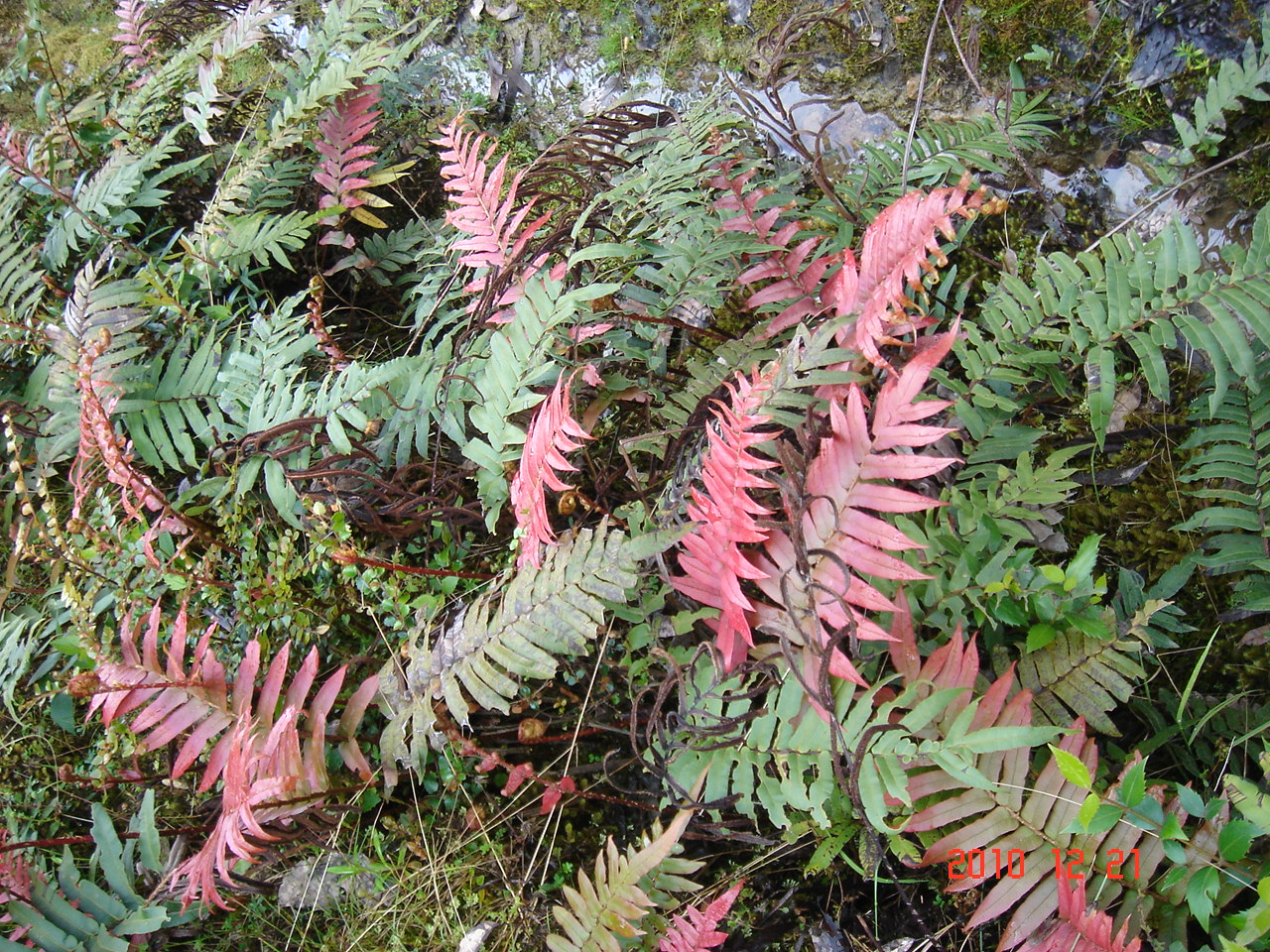
Growing in the Florentine Valley, Tasmania. This image shows the bronze-pink colouration of the young fronds.

== Habit ==
The mature Parablechnum wattsii can grow from 30 cm to 125 cm tall, with large erect fronds. The fern can spread horizontally using scaled rhizomes, which have a creeping, branched habit. Members of the family Blechnaceae exhibit distinctive dimorphic fertile and sterile fronds, which are easily identifiable. The mature sterile fronds are dark, dull green, and leathery and pinnate. Young sterile fronds are pink-bronze tinged until maturity. The pinnae are close together on a long stipe, with the lower pinnae only slightly shorter than the upper pinnae, and a long frond tip. The pinnae have a finely toothed margin, and are slightly stalked - not sessile. They exhibit conspicuous lateral veins, which are crowded and parallel. The fertile fronds are longer than the sterile fronds, and generally grow in the centre of the fern. Sori are continuous along the underside of each mid-vein and cover the majority of the underside of the frond. The pinnae are linear, long and coarse, with long membranous indusia which can be difficult to see in mature fronds.

== Reproduction and propagation ==
Parablechnum wattsii shows the typical life stages of a fern with distinct sporophyte and gametophyte stages. A distinctive feature of the Blechnaceae is the presence of separate fertile and sterile, photosynthetic fronds. The fertile frond produces numerous spores which are prolific and easily collected and propagated to mature plants. It takes around 4–6 weeks for the prothallus to form, and another 6–12 months for the first true fern frond to develop. Mature plants can also be divided from root stock, providing there is little disturbance to the parent rhizome. Natural division through injury of the underground rhizome may also occur as the fern ages and degradation takes place. Once propagated, P. wattsii requires moist sheltered and partially shaded conditions.

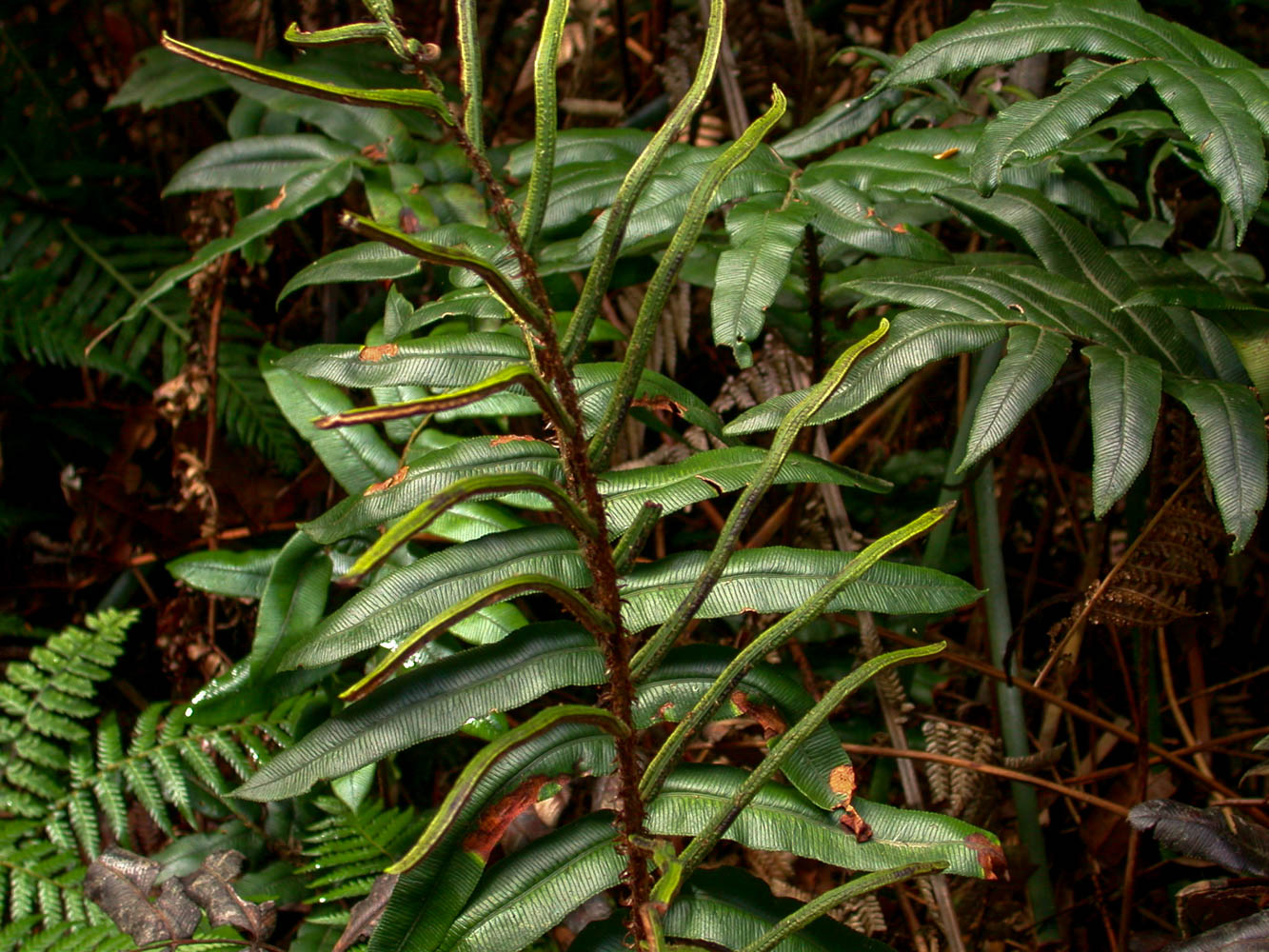
Fertile frond

== Distribution and habitat ==
The hard water fern is found in all of the south eastern Australian states. In Tasmania, it is widespread and abundant, ranging from sea level to 1000 m, in a range of vegetation types. The species is found in many rainforests, and wet sclerophyll forests, preferring damp, shaded areas that are along creek and river beds, on the margins of water courses and waterfalls. This fern prefers a loam/sandy, well-drained soil rich in humus.

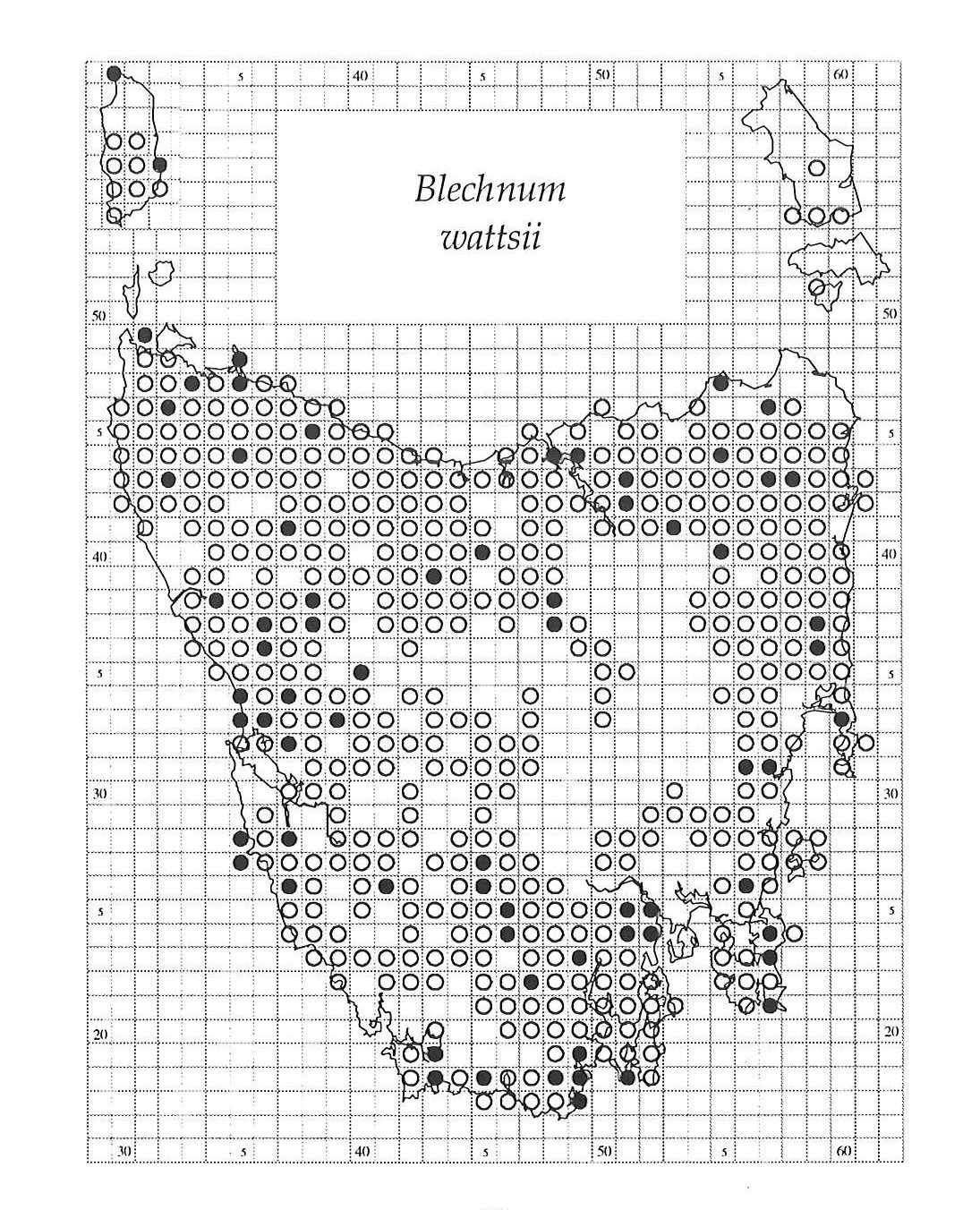
Map of Tasmania showing the distribution of Parablechnum wattsii

== Uses ==
Hard water ferns are propagated for use in large ferneries, beside shaded water areas, and sheltered gullies. P. wattsii is intolerant of drying out so it should be used in areas where water availability is adequate. Aboriginal Australians also use the fern rhizomes for food, eating them raw or roasted as a source of starch.
