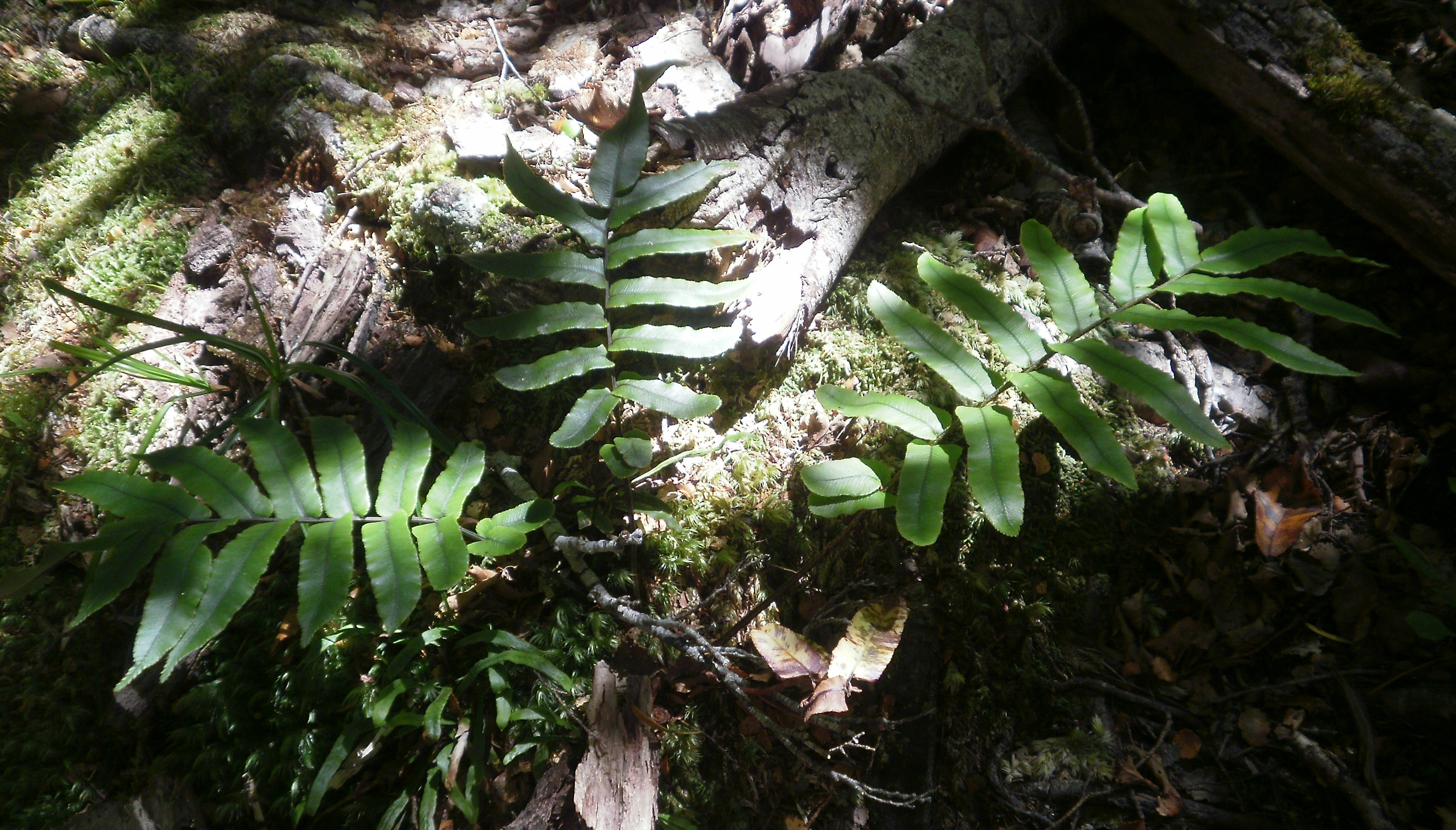
- In the Tararua Ranges, New Zealand

Scientific classification
- Kingdom: Plantae
- Clade: Tracheophytes
- Division: Polypodiophyta
- Class: Polypodiopsida
- Order: Polypodiales
- Suborder: Aspleniineae
- Family: Blechnaceae
- Genus: Parablechnum
- Species: P. procerum

Binomial name
- Parablechnum procerum (G.Forst.) C.Presl

Synonyms
- Asplenium procerum (G.Forst.) Bernh.; Blechnopteris procera (G.Forst.) Trevis.; Blechnum procerum (G.Forst.) Sw.; Lomaria procera (G.Forst.) Spreng.; Onoclea procera (G.Forst.) Spreng.; Osmunda procera G.Forst.; Spicanta capensis var. procera (Sw.) Kuntze; Stegania procera (G.Forst.) R.Br.

= Parablechnum procerum =

Species of fern

Parablechnum procerum, synonym Blechnum procerum, commonly known as mountain kiokio or small kiokio, is a species of fern found in New Zealand. It is found from lowland to alpine areas among forest, scrub and tussock.

P. procerum usually grows to a height of between 30 and 50 cm.
