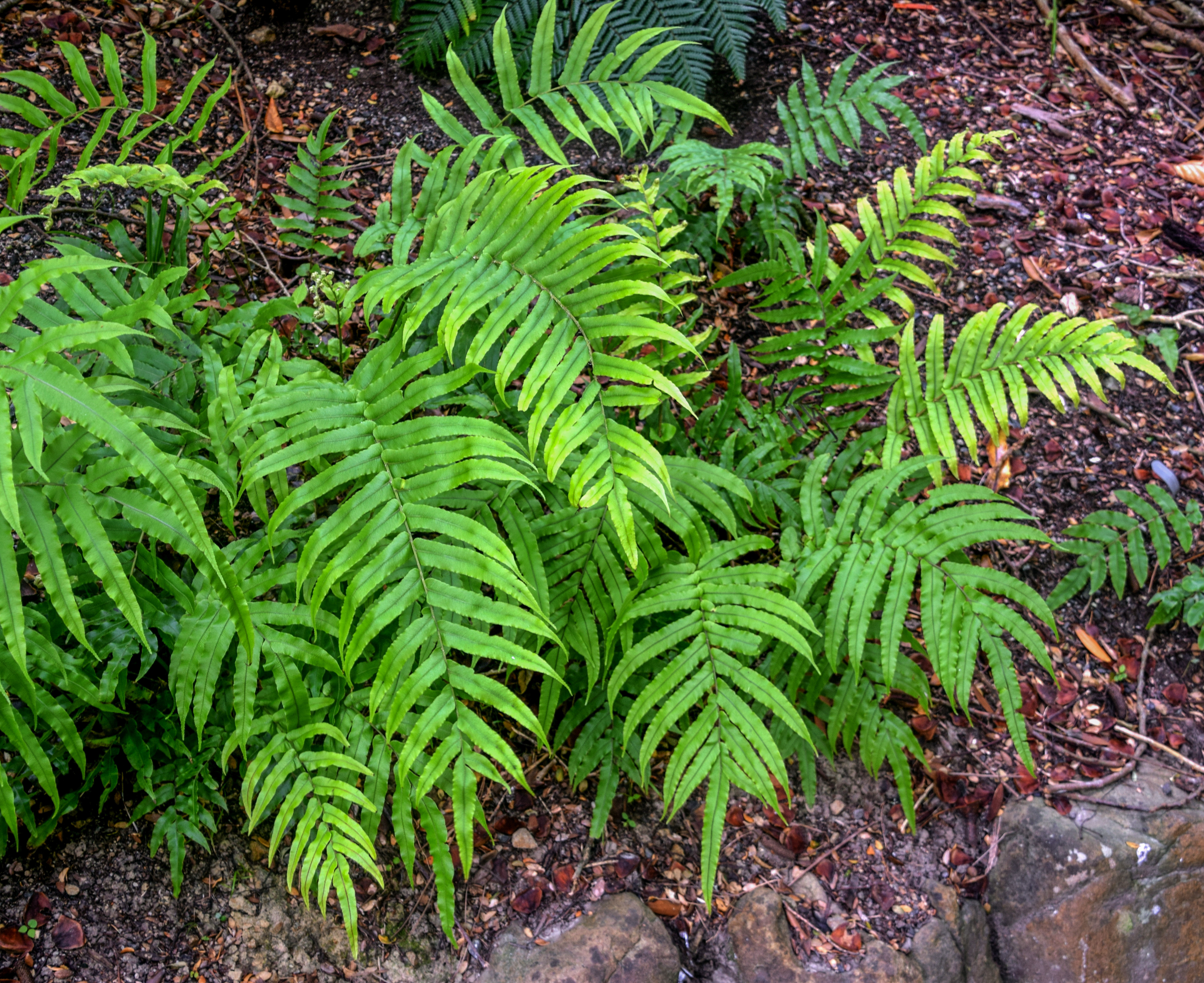
- Parablechnum novae-zelandiae in Wellington Botanic Garden, New Zealand

Scientific classification
- Kingdom: Plantae
- Clade: Tracheophytes
- Division: Polypodiophyta
- Class: Polypodiopsida
- Order: Polypodiales
- Suborder: Aspleniineae
- Family: Blechnaceae
- Subfamily: Blechnoideae
- Genus: Parablechnum; C.Presl

Species
- See text.

= Parablechnum =

Genus of ferns

Parablechnum is a genus of ferns in the family Blechnaceae, subfamily Blechnoideae, according to the Pteridophyte Phylogeny Group classification of 2016 (PPG I). The genus is accepted in a 2016 classification of the family Blechnaceae, but other sources sink it into a very broadly defined Blechnum, equivalent to the whole of the PPG I subfamily.

== Species ==
As of July 2025, using the PPG I classification system, the Checklist of Ferns and Lycophytes of the World accepted the following seventy-six species and one hybrid:

- Parablechnum acanthopodum (T.C.Chambers & P.A.Farrant) Gasper & Salino
- Parablechnum ambiguum (Kaulf. ex C.Presl) C.Presl
- Parablechnum anthracinum (R.C.Moran) Gasper & V.A.O.Dittrich
- Parablechnum articulatum (F.Muell.) Gasper & Salino
- Parablechnum atropurpureum (A.R.Sm.) Gasper & Salino
- Parablechnum bicolor (M.Kessler & A.R.Sm.) Gasper & Salino
- Parablechnum bolivianum (M.Kessler & A.R.Sm.) Gasper & Salino
- Parablechnum brasiliense (Raddi) M.T.Medeiros & Schwartsb.
- Parablechnum camfieldii (Tindale) Gasper & Salino
- Parablechnum capense (Burm. fil.) Gasper & Salino
- Parablechnum chauliodontum (Copel.) Gasper & Salino
- Parablechnum chilense (Kaulf.) Gasper & Salino
- Parablechnum chiriquanum (Broadh.) Gasper & Salino
- Parablechnum cochabambense (M.Kessler & A.R.Sm.) Gasper & Salino
- Parablechnum confusum (E.Fourn.) Gasper & Salino
- Parablechnum corbassonii (Brownlie) Gasper & Salino
- Parablechnum cordatum (Desv.) Gasper & Salino
- Parablechnum dilatatum (T.C.Chambers & P.A.Farrant) Gasper & Salino
- Parablechnum falciforme (Liebm.) Gasper & Salino
- Parablechnum gemmascens (Alston) Gasper & Salino
- Parablechnum givalum J.Murillo
- Parablechnum glaziovii (Christ) Gasper & Salino
- Parablechnum gregsonii (Tindale) Gasper & Salino
- Parablechnum hieronymi (Brause) Gasper & Salino
- Parablechnum howeanum (T.C.Chambers & P.A.Farrant) Gasper & Salino
- Parablechnum humbertii (Tardieu) S.Molino & Lafuente
- Parablechnum imbricatum M.T.Murillo & J.Murillo
- Parablechnum lechleri (Mett.) Gasper & Salino
- Parablechnum lima (Rosenst.) Gasper & Salino
- Parablechnum lineatum (Sw.) Gasper & Salino
- Parablechnum longistipitatum (A.Rojas) A.Rojas
- Parablechnum loxense (Kunth) Gasper & Salino
- Parablechnum marginatum (Fée) Gasper & Salino
- Parablechnum mariae-teresae J.Murillo & L.A.Triana
- Parablechnum milnei (Carruth.) Gasper & Salino
- Parablechnum minus (R.Br.) Gasper & Salino
- Parablechnum monomorphum (R.C.Moran & B. Øllg.) Gasper & Salino
- Parablechnum montanum (T.C.Chambers & P.A.Farrant) Gasper & Salino
- Parablechnum moranianum (A.Rojas) Gasper & Salino
- Parablechnum nesophilum (T.C.Chambers & P.A.Farrant) Gasper & Salino
- Parablechnum novae-zelandiae (T.C.Chambers & P.A.Farrant) Gasper & Salino
- Parablechnum obtusum (R.C.Moran & A.R.Sm.) Gasper & Salino
- Parablechnum pacificum (Lorence & A.R.Sm.) Gasper & Salino
- Parablechnum paucipinna A.R.Sm.
- Parablechnum pazense (M.Kessler & A.R.Sm.) Gasper & Salino
- Parablechnum procerum (G.Forst.) C.Presl
- Parablechnum proliferum (Rosenst.) Gasper & Salino
- Parablechnum prostratum J.Murillo & L.A.Triana
- Parablechnum puniceum (T.C.Chambers, P.J.Edwards & R.J.Johns) Gasper & Salino
- Parablechnum reflexum (Rosenst. ex M.Kessler & A.R.Sm.) Gasper & Salino
- Parablechnum regnellianum (Kunze) G.M.O.Machado & Gasper
- Parablechnum repens (M.Kessler & A.R.Sm.) Gasper & Salino
- Parablechnum revolutum (Alderw.) Gasper & Salino
- Parablechnum rheophyticum (R.C.Moran) Gasper & Salino
- Parablechnum roraimense V.A.O.Dittrich & Gasper
- Parablechnum schiedeanum (Schltdl. ex C.Presl) Gasper & Salino
- Parablechnum sessilifolium (Klotzsch ex Christ) Gasper & Salino
- Parablechnum shuariorum S.Molino, J.N.Zapata, Heal & Testo
- Parablechnum smilodon (M.Kessler & Lehnert) Gasper & Salino
- Parablechnum squamatum (M.Kessler & A.R.Sm.) Gasper & Salino
- Parablechnum squamosissimum (A.Rojas) Gasper & Salino
- Parablechnum stipitellatum (Sodiro) Gasper & Salino
- Parablechnum striatum (Sw.) Gasper & V.A.O.Dittrich
- Parablechnum stuebelii (Hieron.) Gasper & Salino
- Parablechnum subcordatum (E.Fourn.) Gasper & Salino
- Parablechnum talamancanum S.Molino & R.C.Moran
- Parablechnum tectum J.Murillo & L.A.Triana
- Parablechnum triangularifolium (T.C.Chambers & P.A.Farrant) Gasper & Salino
- Parablechnum tuerckheimii (Brause) Gasper & Salino
- Parablechnum usterianum (Christ) Gasper & Salino
- Parablechnum varians (E.Fourn.) Wal, S.Molino & Gabriel y Galán
- Parablechnum vestitum (Blume) Gasper & Salino
- Parablechnum wattsii (Tindale) Gasper & Salino
- Parablechnum werffii (R.C.Moran) Gasper & Salino
- Parablechnum wohlgemuthii M.Kessler & A.R.Sm.
- Parablechnum wurunuran (Parris) Gasper & Salino

=== Hybrid ===
- Parablechnum × palmarense J.Murillo & L.A.Triana
