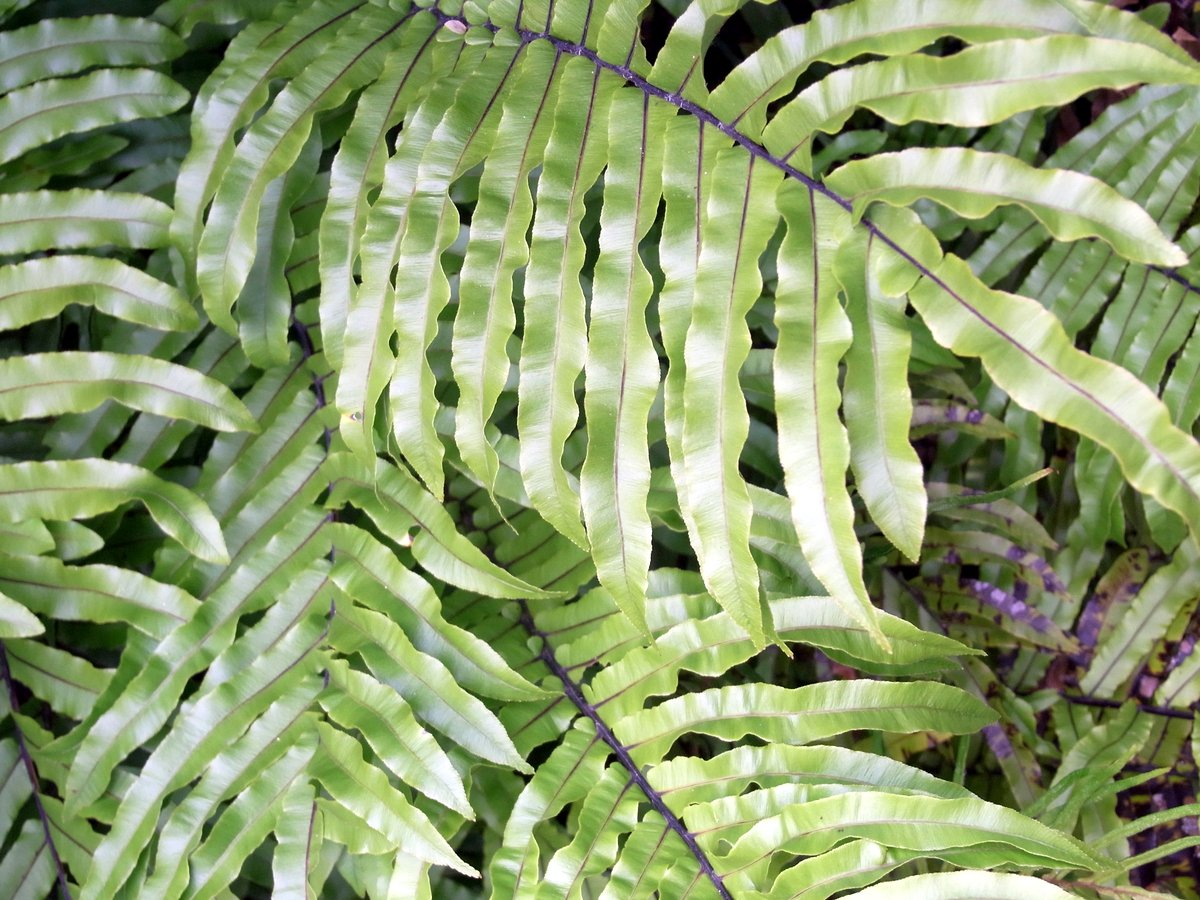

Scientific classification
- Kingdom: Plantae
- Clade: Tracheophytes
- Division: Polypodiophyta
- Class: Polypodiopsida
- Order: Polypodiales
- Suborder: Aspleniineae
- Family: Blechnaceae
- Genus: Parablechnum
- Species: P. minus

Binomial name
- Parablechnum minus (R.Br.) Gasper & Salino

Synonyms
- Blechnum minus (R.Br.) Ettingsh.; Blechnum capense var. minor (R.Br.) Cheeseman; Lomaria minor (R.Br.) Spreng.; Lomaria procera var. minor Hook.f.; Lomaria procera var. paludosa Rodway; Stegania minor R.Br.

= Parablechnum minus =

Soft water fern

Variety of fern

Parablechnum minus, synonym Blechnum minus, is a small fern growing in moist situations in a variety of habitats in eastern Australia. It is often seen by streams.

It first appeared in scientific literature in the year 1810, as Stegania minor in the Prodromus Florae Novae Hollandiae, published by the prolific Scottish botanist, Robert Brown. It was later moved to the genus Blechnum and then to Parablechnum.
