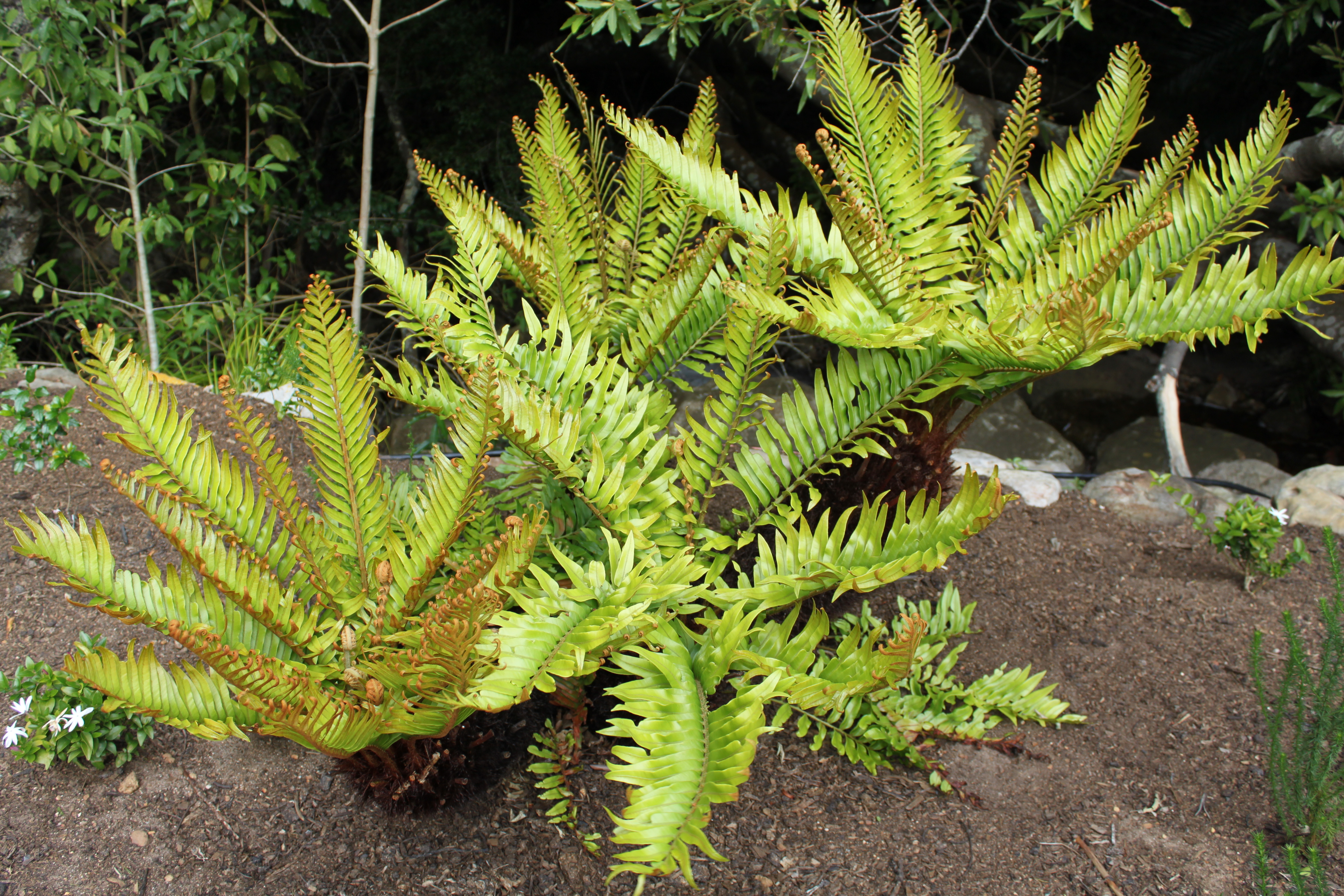

Scientific classification
- Kingdom: Plantae
- Clade: Tracheophytes
- Division: Polypodiophyta
- Class: Polypodiopsida
- Order: Polypodiales
- Suborder: Aspleniineae
- Family: Blechnaceae
- Genus: Lomariocycas
- Species: L. tabularis

Binomial name
- Lomariocycas tabularis (Thunb.) Gasper & A.R.Sm.

Synonyms
- Blechnum cycadoides (Pappe & Rawson) Kuhn; Blechnum dalgairnsiae (Pappe & Rawson) Kuhn; Blechnum gueinzii (Moug.ex Fée) Moore; Blechnum imperiale (Fée & Glaz.) Christ; Blechnum salicifolium Ettingsh.; Blechnum schottianum Mett; Blechnum tabulare (Thunb.) Kuhn; Blechnum wolamense Cufod.; Lomaria boryana (Sw.) Willd.; Lomaria cinnamomea Kaulf.; Lomaria coriacea Schrad.; Lomaria cycadoides Pappe & Rawson; Lomaria dalgairnsiae Pappe & Rawson; Lomaria gueinzii Moug.ex Fée; Lomaria imperialis Fée & Glaz.; Lomaria tabularis (Thunb.) Mett.ex Baker; Lonchitis tabularis (Thunb.) Farw.; Onoclea boryana Sw.; Pteris osmundoides Bory; Pteris tabularis Thunb.; Spicanta tabularis (Thunb.) Kuntze; Spicanta osmundoides (Bory) Kuntze; Struthiopteris imperialis (Fée & Glaz.ex Fée) Ching

= Lomariocycas tabularis =

Species of fern

Lomariocycas tabularis, synonym Blechnum tabulare, known as the mountain blechnum is a large, attractive fern with a native range from southern Brazil to northern Argentina, as well as tropical & southern Africa and islands in the Indian Ocean. It grows primarily in the wet tropical biome.

== Description ==
They grow in a similar way to the classic tree ferns (Cyathea), and are also often mistaken for being cycads.

This species can be distinguished from related species by the bases of its pinnae. This is the only species in which the base of each pinna has an uneven shape. All other species have equally shaped pinna bases.

== Distribution and habitat ==
It occurs from Cape Town, South Africa, in the south, as far north as Uganda and Nigeria. This fern's natural habitat is along river banks and on the margins of afro-montane forests. It grows very well in shady areas, making it a popular plant for African gardens. Unfortunately this has led to a large illegal trade in these plants which has seen their numbers decline.
