= Parablechnum proliferum =

Scientific classification
- Kingdom: Plantae
- Clade: Tracheophytes
- Division: Polypodiophyta
- Class: Polypodiopsida
- Order: Polypodiales
- Suborder: Aspleniineae
- Family: Blechnaceae
- Genus: Parablechnum
- Species: P. proliferum

Binomial name
- Parablechnum proliferum (Rosenst.) Gasper & Salino

Synonyms
- Blechnum proliferum Rosenst.; Blechnum tenuifolium Rosenst.; Blechnum viviparum (Broadh.) C.Chr.; Struthiopteris vivipara Broadh.

Species of fern

Parablechnum proliferum is a fern in the family Blechnaceae, native to Central America and locally in northern South America, formerly treated in the genus Blechnum but now transferred to Parablechnum. The pinnate fronds are red when young, turning dark green with maturity, and each frond has a plantlet at its tip which can grow into a complete plant if it contacts the soil.
