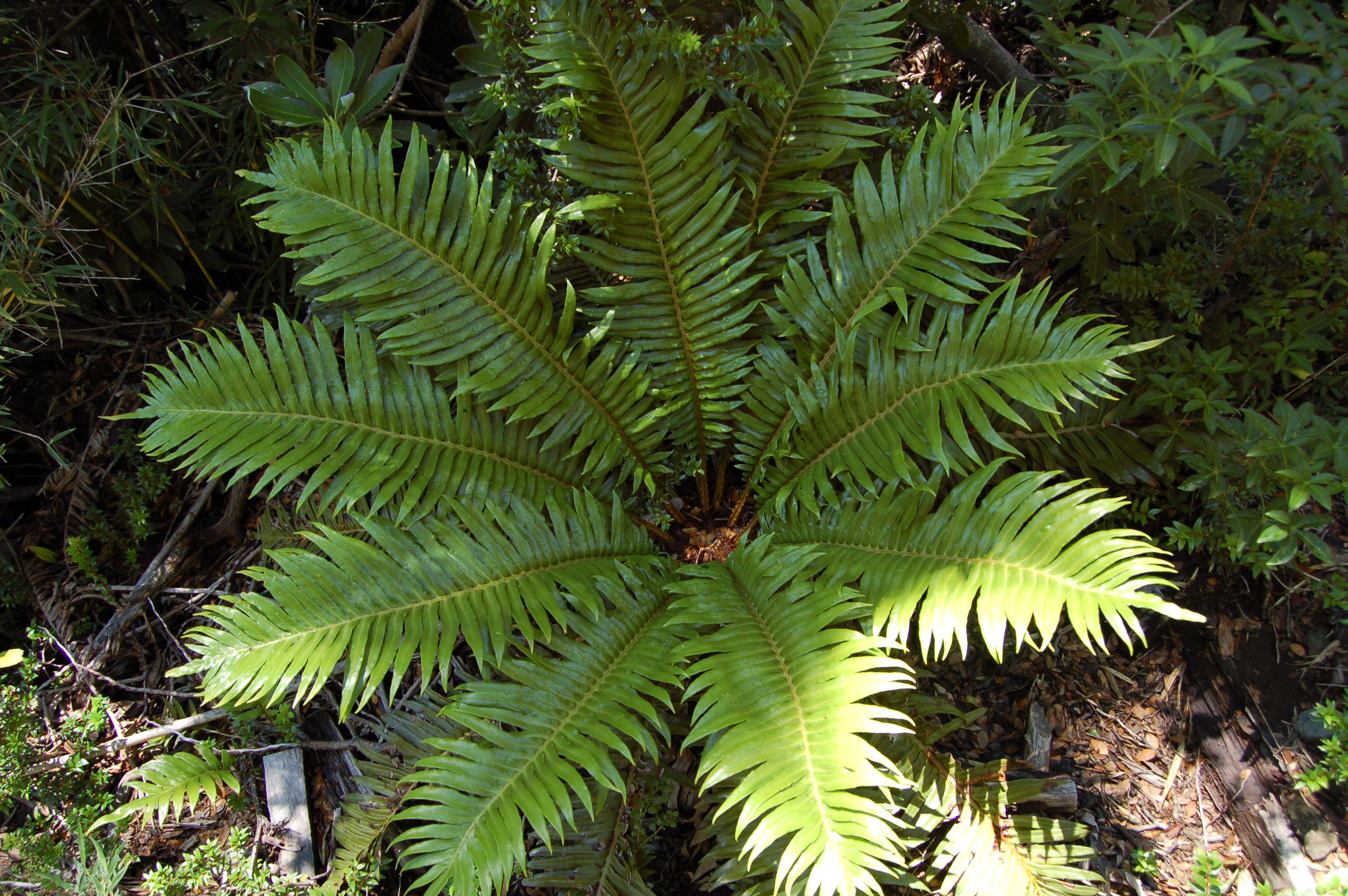
- From above

Scientific classification
- Kingdom: Plantae
- Clade: Tracheophytes
- Division: Polypodiophyta
- Class: Polypodiopsida
- Order: Polypodiales
- Suborder: Aspleniineae
- Family: Blechnaceae
- Genus: Lomariocycas
- Species: L. magellanica

Binomial name
- Lomariocycas magellanica (Desv.) Gasper & A.R.Sm.

Synonyms
- Blechnum magellanicum (Desv.) Mett.; Blechnum tabulare var. setigerum (Gaudich.) Capurro; Lomaria magellanica Desv.; Lomaria setigera Gaudich.

= Lomariocycas magellanica =

Species of fern

Lomariocycas magellanica, synonym Blechnum magellanicum, costilla de vaca (Chilean Spanish for cow's rib) or palmilla, is a medium-sized fern native with a natural range from Talca at 35°S, to the Magallanes Region in Chile. It grows from sea level up to 2200 m.a.s.l. It grows also in the humid valleys of western Argentina close to the Chilean border.
