= Parablechnum monomorphum =

Conservation status
- Vulnerable (IUCN 3.1)

Scientific classification
- Kingdom: Plantae
- Clade: Tracheophytes
- Division: Polypodiophyta
- Class: Polypodiopsida
- Order: Polypodiales
- Suborder: Aspleniineae
- Family: Blechnaceae
- Genus: Parablechnum
- Species: P. monomorphum

Binomial name
- Parablechnum monomorphum (R.C.Moran & B.Øllg.) Gasper & Salino

Synonyms
- Blechnum monomorphum R.C.Moran & B.Øllg.

Species of fern

Parablechnum monomorphum, synonym Blechnum monomorphum is a species of fern in the family Blechnaceae. It is native to Colombia (Antioquia), Ecuador and Bolivia (La Paz).

In its 2003 assessment, the IUCN Red List regarded the species as endemic to Ecuador, its natural habitat being subtropical or tropical moist montane forests, and rated it as threatened by habitat loss. It is now considered to have a much wider distribution in north-western South America.
