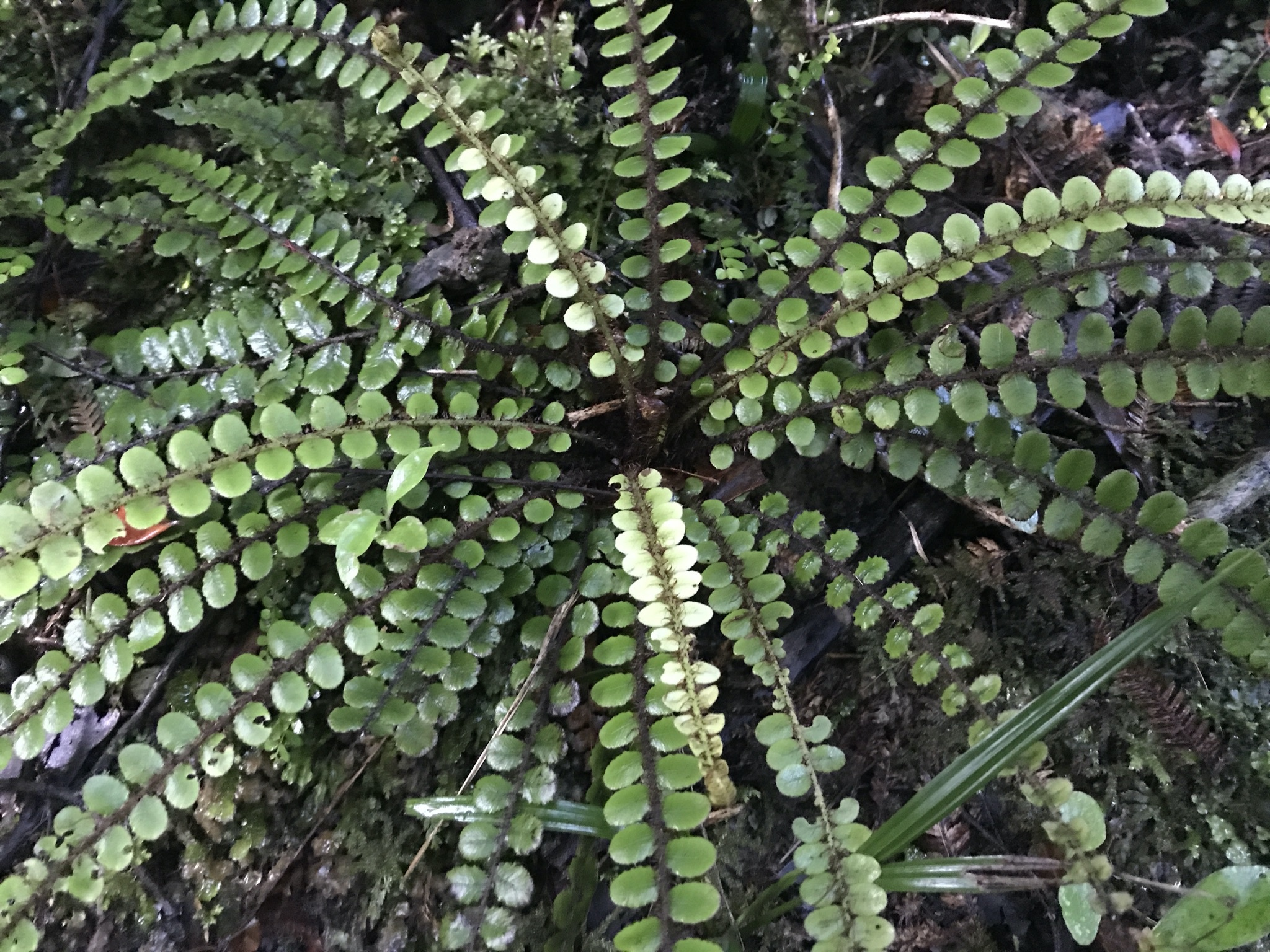

Scientific classification
- Kingdom: Plantae
- Clade: Tracheophytes
- Division: Polypodiophyta
- Class: Polypodiopsida
- Order: Polypodiales
- Suborder: Aspleniineae
- Family: Blechnaceae
- Genus: Cranfillia
- Species: C. fluviatilis

Binomial name
- Cranfillia fluviatilis (R.Br.) Gasper & V.A.O.Dittrich

Synonyms
- Blechnum fluviatile (R.Br.) Lowe; Blechnum nudius Copel.; Lomaria fluviatilis (R.Br.) Spreng.; Lomaria rotundifolia Colenso; Spicanta fluviatilis (R.Br.) Kuntze; Stegania fluviatilis R.Br.

= Cranfillia fluviatilis =

Species of fern

Cranfillia fluviatilis, synonym Blechnum fluviatile, is a fern known in the Māori language as kiwikiwi. A herbaceous plant, C. fluviatilis is a "hard fern" of the genus Cranfillia in the family Blechnaceae. It was identified by Patrick Brownsey in 1979. Other common names are star fern, creek fern, kawakawa and kiwakiwa.

== Morphology ==
Ladderlike fronds of C. fluviatilis measure up to 50 cm (20 in) long. Growing in a distinctive ground-hugging rosette shape, its fertile fronds – dark brown and spiky – stand upright from the centre, while the drooping sterile fronds with their nearly round leaflets, form the rosette. As the parent plant ages it develops a short trunk central to a surrounding colony.

== Range and ecology ==
The hardy C. fluviatilis requires moist, shaded conditions for optimal growth. A small ground fern, the species is native to New Zealand and southeast Australia, a syntype common throughout the country in damp, shady areas in acidic, moist and boggy soil, beside streams in forest areas. This fern species occurs throughout much of New Zealand's forests, including much of the forested area of North Island; west, north and south coasts of South Island; and Stewart Island / Rakiura; moreover, it occurs in parts of the coastal forests of southeast Australia. Example understory flora associates in the mixed broadleaf/podocarp forests of Rakiura include Austroblechnum durum.

== History ==
It was collected by William Colenso in December 1841, at the precise locality of woods near Poverty Bay in the North Island.
