= Cranfillia geniculata =

Scientific classification
- Kingdom: Plantae
- Clade: Tracheophytes
- Division: Polypodiophyta
- Class: Polypodiopsida
- Order: Polypodiales
- Suborder: Aspleniineae
- Family: Blechnaceae
- Genus: Cranfillia
- Species: C. geniculata

Binomial name
- Cranfillia geniculata (T.C.Chambers & P.A.Farrant) Gasper & V.A.O.Dittrich

Synonyms
- Blechnum geniculatum T.C.Chambers & P.A.Farrant

Species of fern

Cranfillia geniculata, synonym Blechnum geniculatum, is a fern in the family Blechnaceae. The specific epithet refers to the geniculate (sharply bent) base of the sterile fronds.

== Description ==
The plant is a terrestrial or lithophytic fern. The creeping rhizome has dense apical scales. Its fronds are 10–25 cm long and 7–15 cm wide.

== Distribution and habitat ==
The fern is endemic to Australia's subtropical Lord Howe Island in the Tasman Sea. It grows on moist, shaded banks in cloud forest on the summits of Mounts Gower and Lidgbird, where it is rare.
