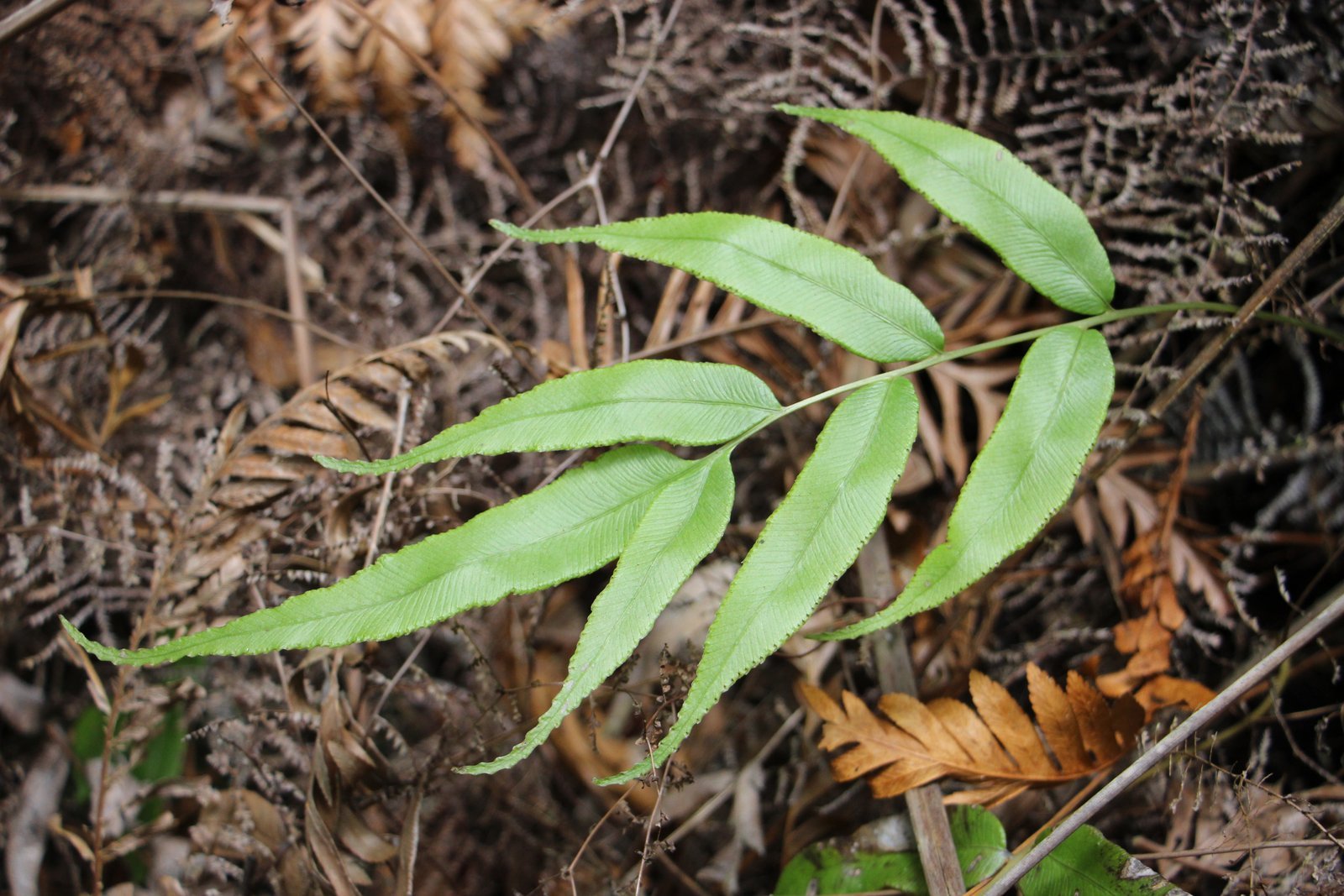
- Growing below a waterfall near Lawson, New South Wales, Australia

Scientific classification
- Kingdom: Plantae
- Clade: Tracheophytes
- Division: Polypodiophyta
- Class: Polypodiopsida
- Order: Polypodiales
- Suborder: Aspleniineae
- Family: Blechnaceae
- Genus: Parablechnum
- Species: P. gregsonii

Binomial name
- Parablechnum gregsonii (Watts) Gasper & Salino

Synonyms
- Blechnum gregsonii (Watts) Tindale; Blechnum capense var. gregsoni Watts

= Parablechnum gregsonii =

Species of fern

Parablechnum gregsonii, synonym Blechnum gregsonii, is a type of fern, mostly seen in the Illawarra and Blue Mountains areas of eastern Australia, often near waterfalls and moist gullies.

== Description ==
Parablechnum gregsonii is a fern with a creeping rhizome and pendent, mostly pinnate fronds 30–80 cm (10–30 in) long. The pinnae are bright green, mostly 7–15 cm (3–6 in) long with coarse teeth near the tips.

== Taxonomy and naming ==
This species was first formally described in 1915 by William Walter Watts from a specimen collected by "Mr Jesse Gregson...in 1902" and given the name Blechnum capense var. gregsonii. The description was published in the Journal and Proceedings of the Royal Society of New South Wales. The specific epithet (gregsonii) honours Edward Jesse Gregson who collected the type specimen "on a wet ledge in the face of a perpendicular cliff overlooking a permanent creek in a gully at the base of Green Mountain, a little on the Bell side of Mount Wilson." In 1960, Mary Tindale elevated the variety to the species Blechnum gregsonii. In the Pteridophyte Phylogeny Group classification of 2016 (PPG I), this species is placed in the genus Parablechnum.

== Distribution and habitat ==
This fern occurs in the Blue Mountains and ranges of the Illawarra region, where it grows in cool rainforest, often in damp places near waterfalls.
