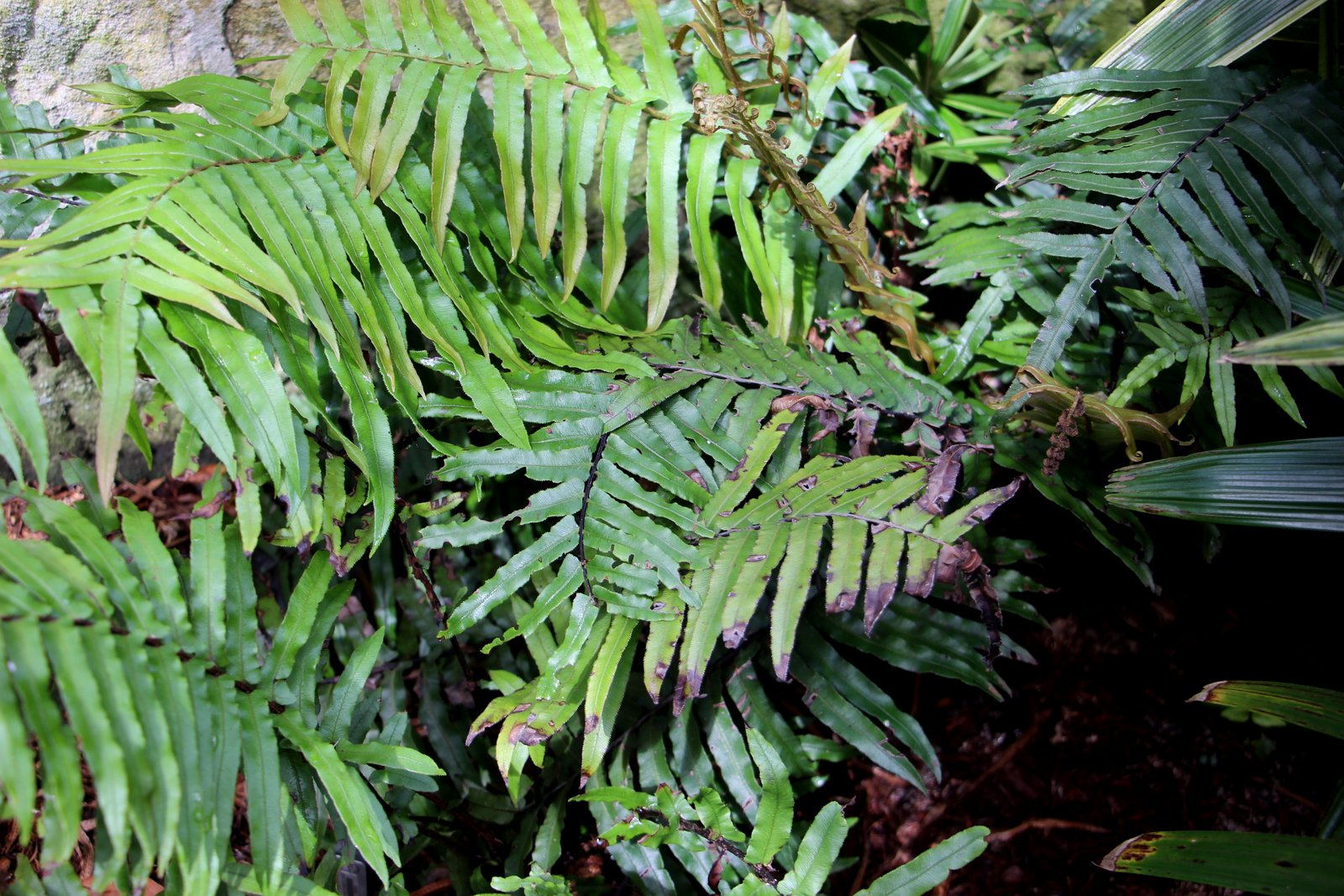
- At Royal Botanic Gardens, Sydney, Australia

Scientific classification
- Kingdom: Plantae
- Clade: Tracheophytes
- Division: Polypodiophyta
- Class: Polypodiopsida
- Order: Polypodiales
- Suborder: Aspleniineae
- Family: Blechnaceae
- Genus: Parablechnum
- Species: P. camfieldii

Binomial name
- Parablechnum camfieldii (Tindale) Gasper & Salino

Synonyms
- Blechnum camfieldii, Tindale; Blechnum capense var. scabrum, Domin; Blechnum minus subsp. scabrum (Domin), Tindale; Lomaria capensis var. bauerlenii, F.M.Bailey

= Parablechnum camfieldii =

eared swamp fern

Species of fern

Parablechnum camfieldii, synonym Blechnum camfieldii is known as the eared swamp fern. Often found near saline areas, or low-lying coastal sites in eastern Australia. The new growth is often pink in colour. Named after Julius Henry Camfield (Wd), a gardener at the Royal Botanic Gardens, Sydney.
