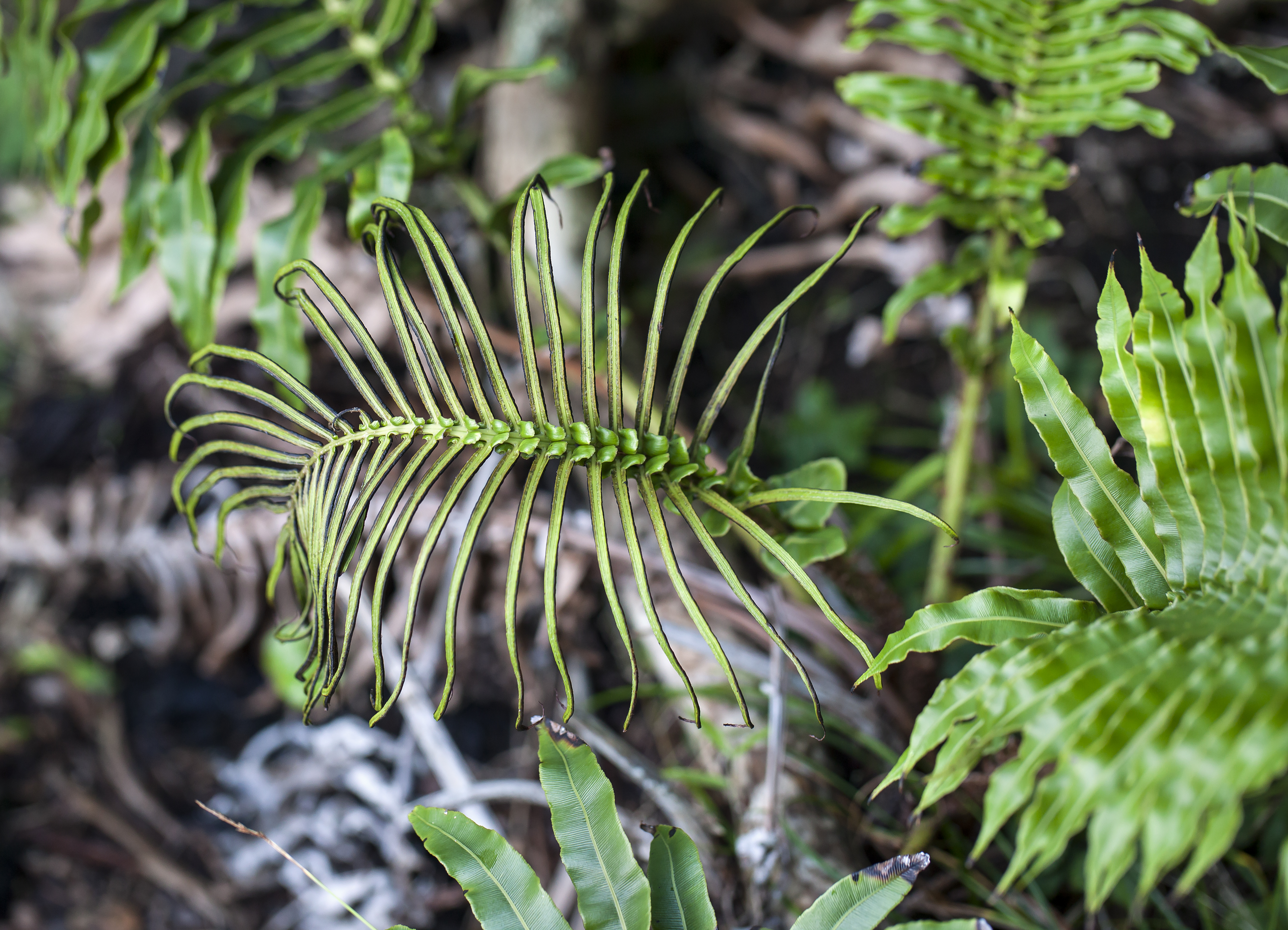

Scientific classification
- Kingdom: Plantae
- Clade: Tracheophytes
- Division: Polypodiophyta
- Class: Polypodiopsida
- Order: Polypodiales
- Suborder: Aspleniineae
- Family: Blechnaceae
- Genus: Parablechnum
- Species: P. howeanum

Binomial name
- Parablechnum howeanum (T.C.Chambers & P.A.Farrant) Gasper & Salino

Synonyms
- Blechnum howeanum T.C.Chambers & P.A.Farrant

= Parablechnum howeanum =

Species of fern

Parablechnum howeanum, synonym Blechnum howeanum, is a fern in the family Blechnaceae. The specific epithet refers to the locality to which it is endemic.

== Description ==
The plant is a terrestrial fern. The creeping or shortly erect rhizome has dense apical scales. Its fronds are up to 70 cm long and 40 cm wide.

== Distribution and habitat ==
The fern is endemic to Australia's subtropical Lord Howe Island in the Tasman Sea. It grows in shaded mountain forest, especially on the summits of Mounts Gower and Lidgbird.
