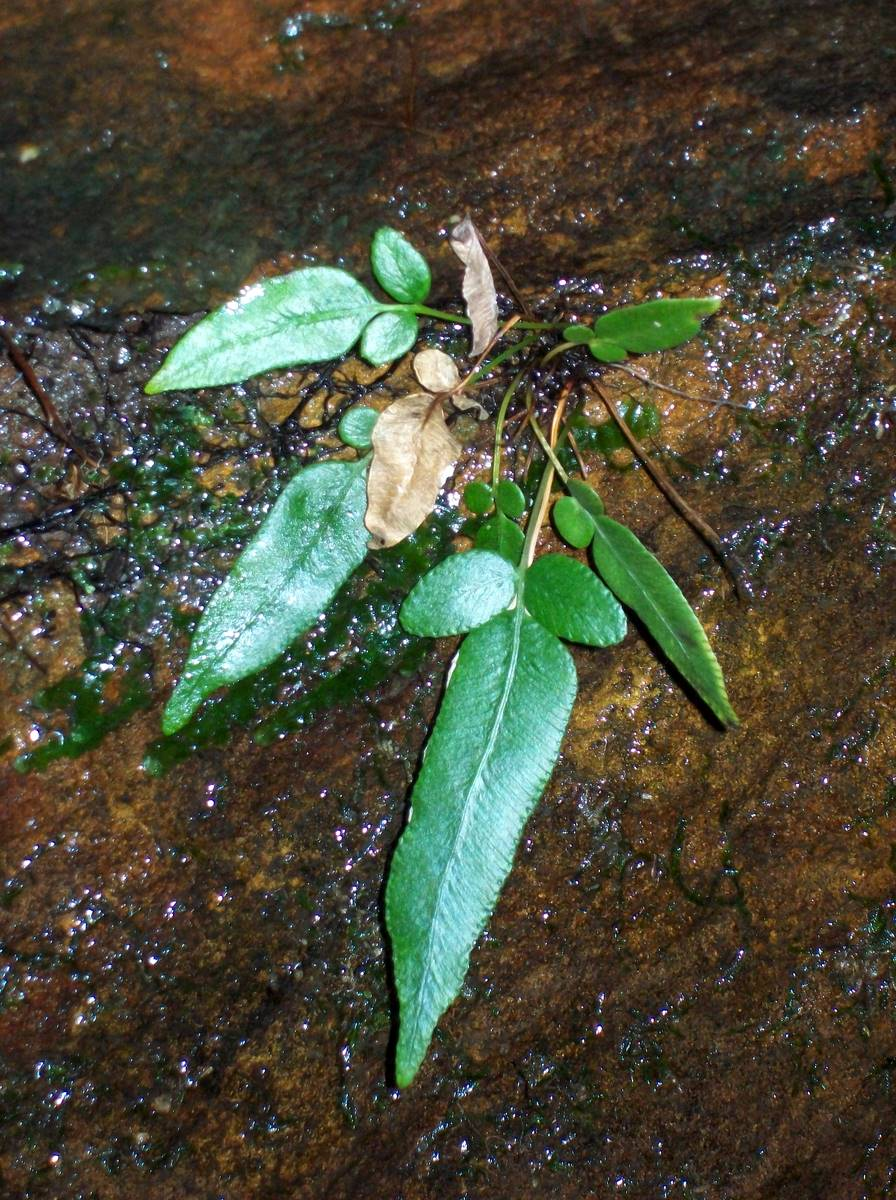
- Below a waterfall near Elvina Bay, Ku-ring-gai Chase National Park, Australia

Scientific classification
- Kingdom: Plantae
- Clade: Tracheophytes
- Division: Polypodiophyta
- Class: Polypodiopsida
- Order: Polypodiales
- Suborder: Aspleniineae
- Family: Blechnaceae
- Genus: Parablechnum
- Species: P. ambiguum

Binomial name
- Parablechnum ambiguum (Kaulf. ex C.Presl) C.Presl

Synonyms
- Blechnopteris ambiguum (Kaulf. ex C.Presl) Trevis.; Blechnum ambiguum Kaulf. ex C.Presl; Blechnum procerum var. blechnoides Luerss.; Doodia caudata var.lomarina F.Muell.; Lomaria ambigua (Kaulf. ex C.Presl) Fée; Lomaria procera var. blechnoides (Luerss.) Wawra; Lomaria scabra Kaulf.ex Sieber; Orthogramma laevigata C.Presl; Parablechnum procerum var. acuminata C.Presl; Spicanta laevigata (C.Presl) Kuntze

= Parablechnum ambiguum =

Species of fern

Parablechnum ambiguum, synonym Blechnum ambiguum, is a species of fern in the family Blechnaceae. growing on wet rocks in eastern Australia, often seen near waterfalls. It is common around Sydney.
