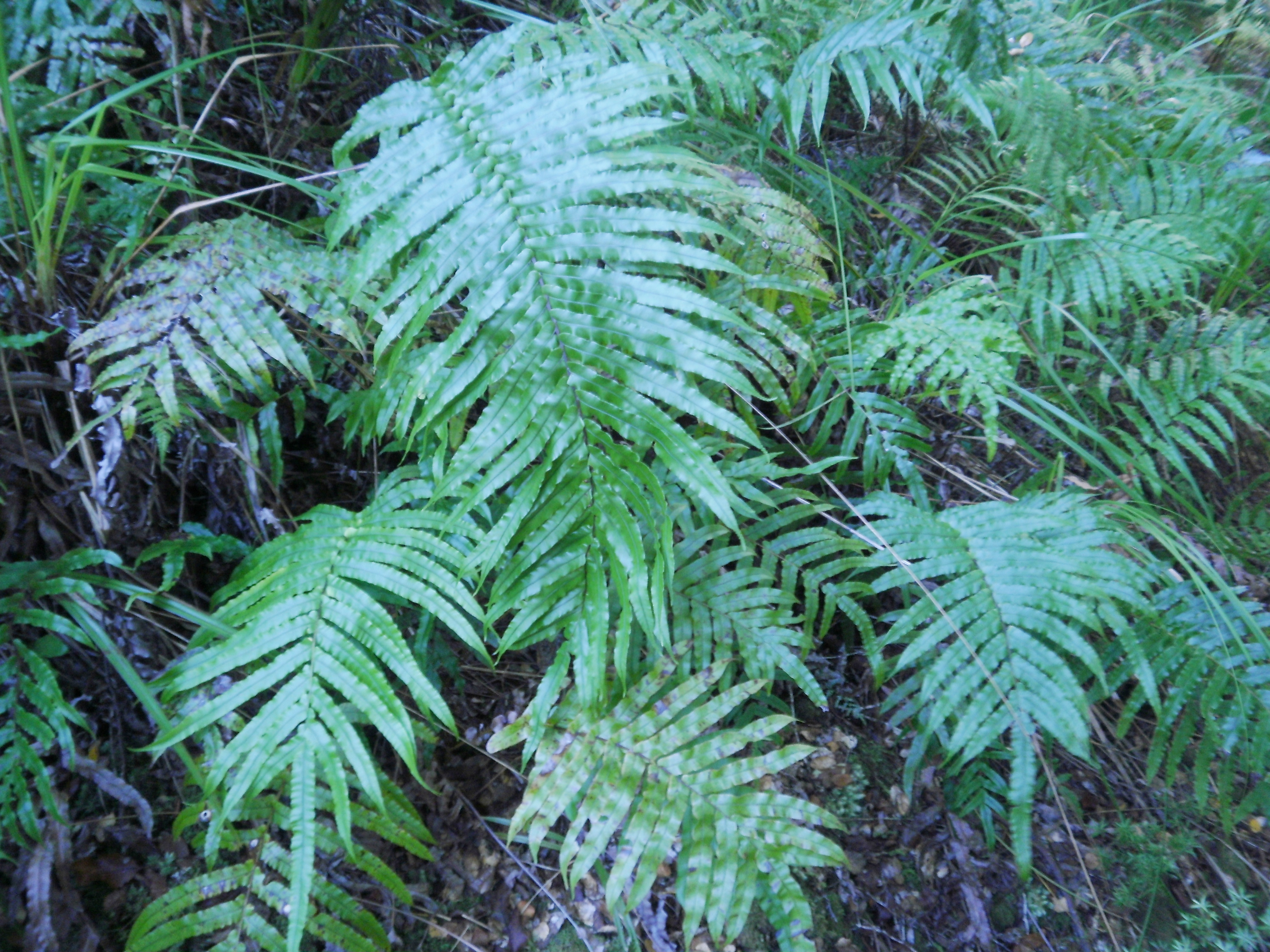

Scientific classification
- Kingdom: Plantae
- Clade: Tracheophytes
- Division: Polypodiophyta
- Class: Polypodiopsida
- Order: Polypodiales
- Suborder: Aspleniineae
- Family: Blechnaceae
- Genus: Parablechnum
- Species: P. novae-zelandiae

Binomial name
- Parablechnum novae-zelandiae (T.C.Chambers & P.A.Farrant) Gasper & Salino

Synonyms
- Blechnum novae-zelandiae T.C.Chambers & P.A.Farrant

= Parablechnum novae-zelandiae =

Species of fern

Parablechnum novae-zelandiae, synonym Blechnum novae-zelandiae, commonly known as palm-leaf fern or kiokio, is a species of fern found in New Zealand. It can often be found growing in clay soil on embankments and roadsides.

P. novae-zelandiae has long fronds that grow up to 2 metres long by 50 cm wide. They are pink when new and as they age they turn green and darken.

Kiokio is edible. Its steamed leaves were relied on by Māori travellers in bush regions.
