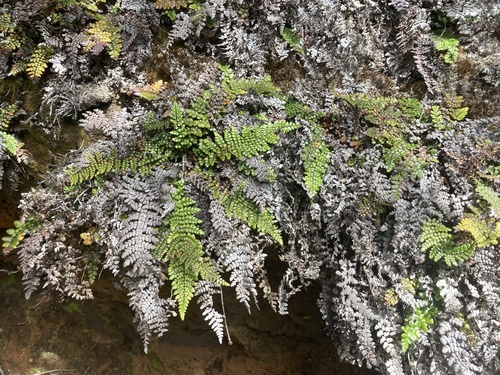

Scientific classification
- Kingdom: Plantae
- Clade: Tracheophytes
- Division: Polypodiophyta
- Class: Polypodiopsida
- Order: Polypodiales
- Suborder: Aspleniineae
- Family: Blechnaceae
- Genus: Sadleria
- Species: S. unisora

Binomial name
- Sadleria unisora (Baker) W.J. Rob.

= Sadleria unisora =

Species of plant

Sadleria unisora is a species of chain fern endemic to the Alakaʻi plateau on the island of Kauaʻi.

== Distribution and habitat ==
Sadleria unisora is only found at elevations between 400–1,520 m (1,310–4,990 ft) in native wet forests on the island of Kauaʻi, where it occupies steep walls above streams and canyons.
