= Stenochlaena hainanensis =

Conservation status
- Endangered (IUCN 3.1)

Scientific classification
- Kingdom: Plantae
- Clade: Tracheophytes
- Division: Polypodiophyta
- Class: Polypodiopsida
- Order: Polypodiales
- Suborder: Aspleniineae
- Family: Blechnaceae
- Genus: Stenochlaena
- Species: S. hainanensis

Binomial name
- Stenochlaena hainanensis Ching & P.S.Chiu

Species of fern

Stenochlaena hainanensis is a species of fern in the family Blechnaceae. It is endemic to China. Its natural habitat is subtropical or tropical dry forests. It is threatened by habitat loss.
