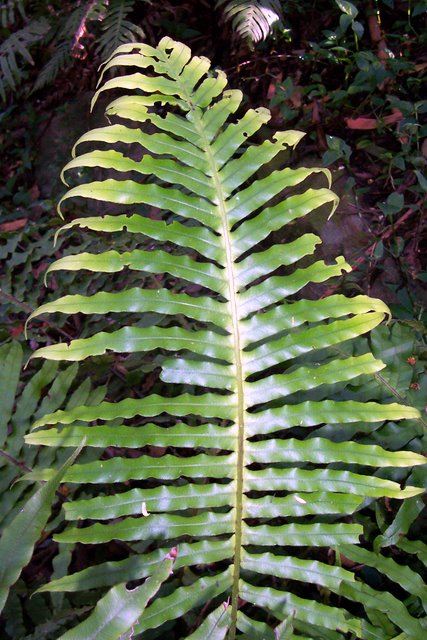
- At Chatswood West, Australia

Scientific classification
- Kingdom: Plantae
- Clade: Tracheophytes
- Division: Polypodiophyta
- Class: Polypodiopsida
- Order: Polypodiales
- Suborder: Aspleniineae
- Family: Blechnaceae
- Genus: Oceaniopteris
- Species: O. cartilaginea

Binomial name
- Oceaniopteris cartilaginea (Sw.) Gasper & Salino

Synonyms
- Blechnum cartilagineum Sw.; Blechnopsis cartilaginea (Sw.) C.Presl; Blechnum nitidum var. contracta Hook.; Salpichlaena cartilaginea (Sw.) Trevis.; Spicanta cartilaginea (Sw.) Kuntze

= Oceaniopteris cartilaginea =

Gristle fern

Species of fern

Oceaniopteris cartilaginea, synonym Blechnum cartilagineum, is known as the gristle fern or soft water fern. It is a resilient and abundant fern growing in eastern Australia, seen in rainforest and eucalyptus forest. The new growth is often pink or reddish in colour.

It is very tolerant of dry conditions once established in a shady area. It can be found in sheltered areas along creeks within 200m of sea level that are within dry sclerophyll forest or on the margins of wet sclerophyll forest.
