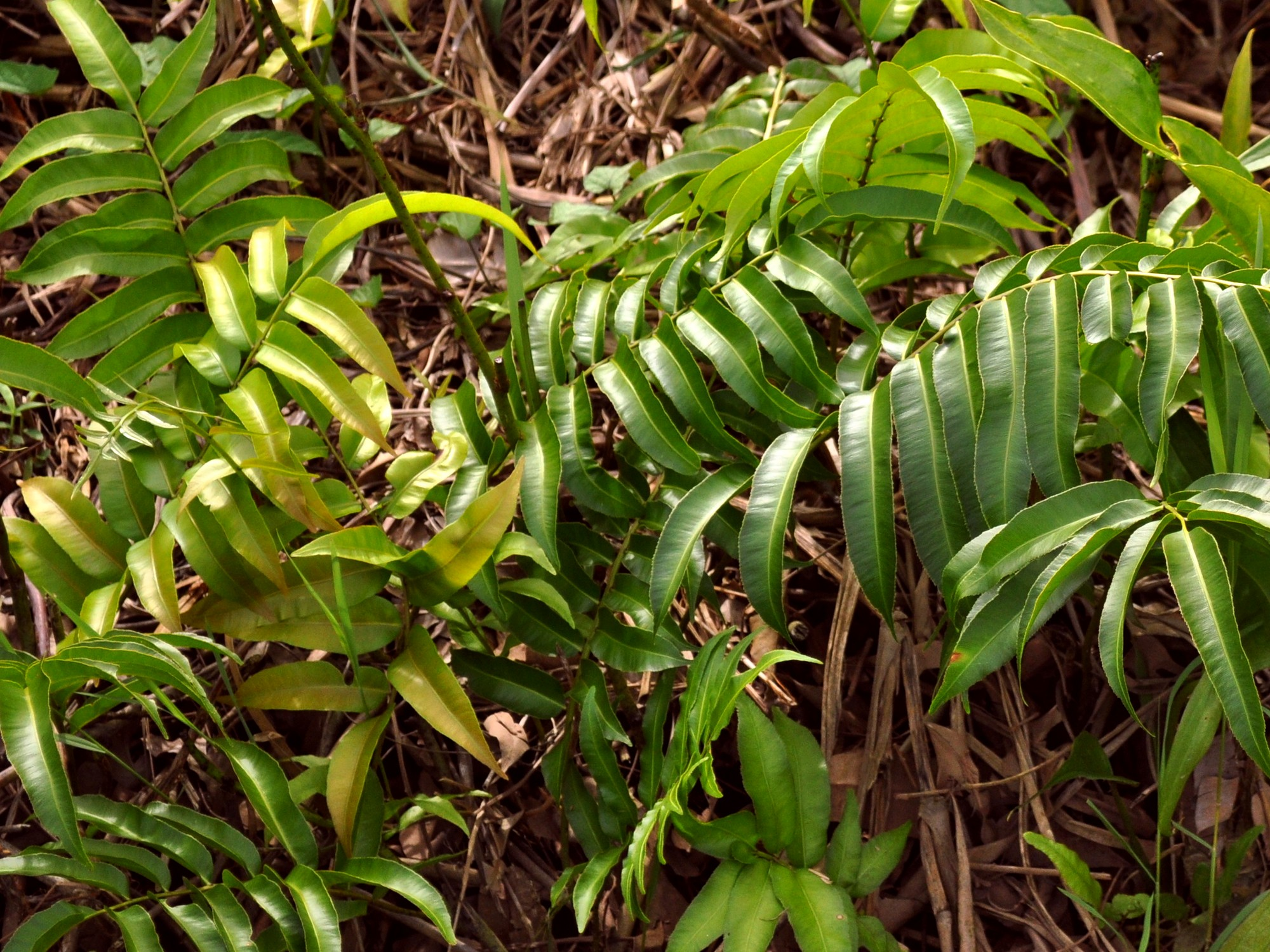

Scientific classification
- Kingdom: Plantae
- Clade: Tracheophytes
- Division: Polypodiophyta
- Class: Polypodiopsida
- Order: Polypodiales
- Suborder: Aspleniineae
- Family: Blechnaceae
- Genus: Stenochlaena
- Species: S. palustris

Binomial name
- Stenochlaena palustris (Burm. f.) Bedd.

= Stenochlaena palustris =

Species of fern

Stenochlaena palustris (Vietnamese: choại, Tagalog: dilimán or hagnaya) is an edible medicinal fern species. In the folk medicines of India and Malaysia, the leaves of this fern are used as remedies for fever, skin diseases, ulcers, and stomachache.

This plant is a long-climbing fern with thin black scales and stems that can reach up to 20 m. It has pinnate fronds that are 30–100 cm long, petioles that are 7–20 cm long, and ovate lanceolate pinnae that are 10–15 cm long and 1.5–4.5 cm wide. The fern's sporophylls are long and narrow, and have brownish sori underneath.

Acylated flavonol glycosides isolated from the fern were found to have antibacterial activities. Crude and partially purified extracts prepared from the fern have been shown to exhibit antifungal, antioxidant, and antiglucosidase activities.

The district of Diliman in Quezon City, one of the Philippines' most important educational districts, is named after this fern. The species epithet palustris is Latin for "of the marsh" and indicates its common habitat.

== Cuisine ==
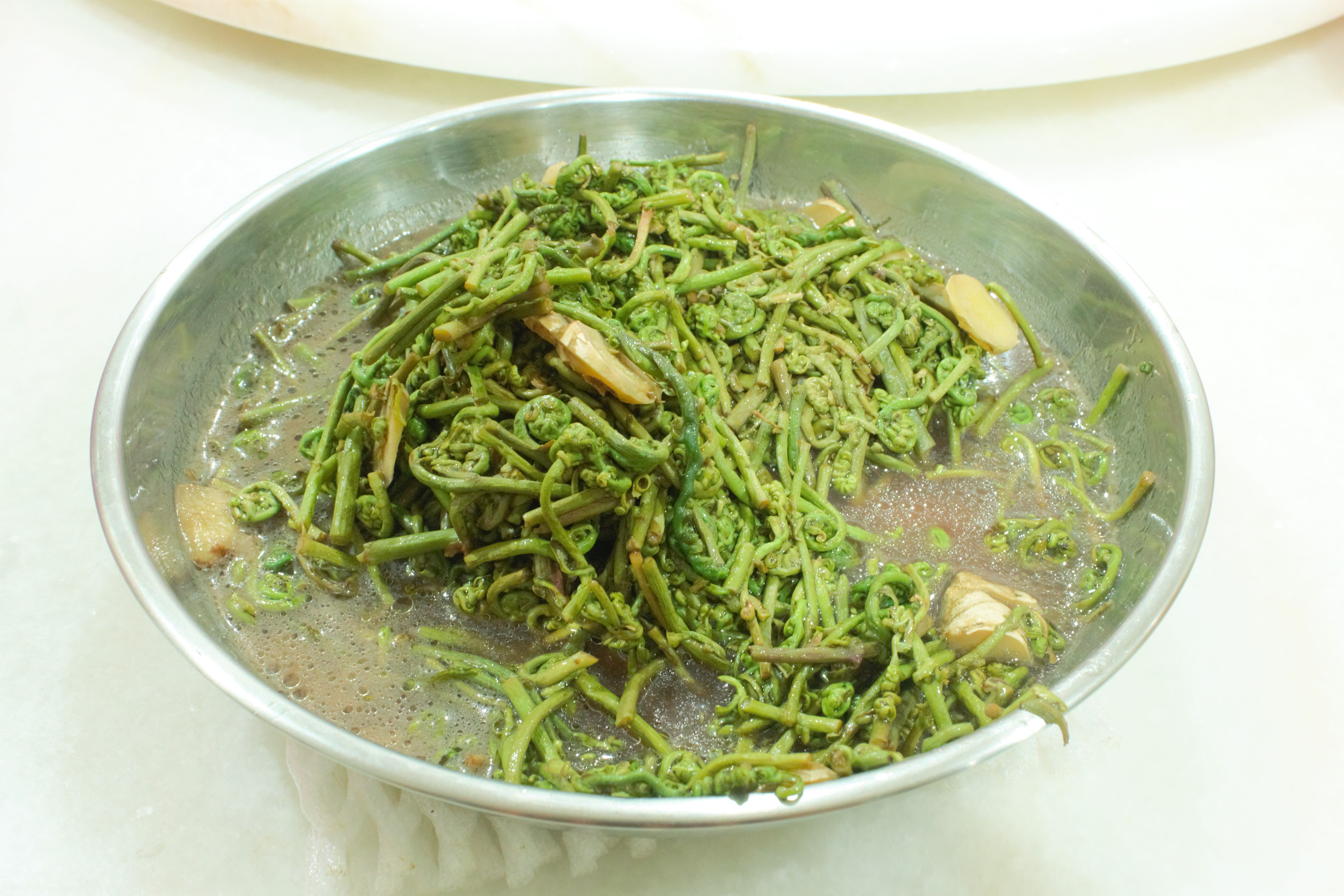
A plate of stir-fried “Midin" together with ginger in Sarawak.

In the Malaysian state of Sarawak, the plant is called "Midin". It is a popular food among the locals. The young fronds are usually served stir-fried with garlic, dry shrimps, or Shrimp paste. (Belacan). In Sabah, it is called "Lembiding". People usually cook it with sardines or belacan.

In Vietnam, the young fronds are called đọt choại and can be used in soups, salads and some stir fry dishes, especially with garlic.
