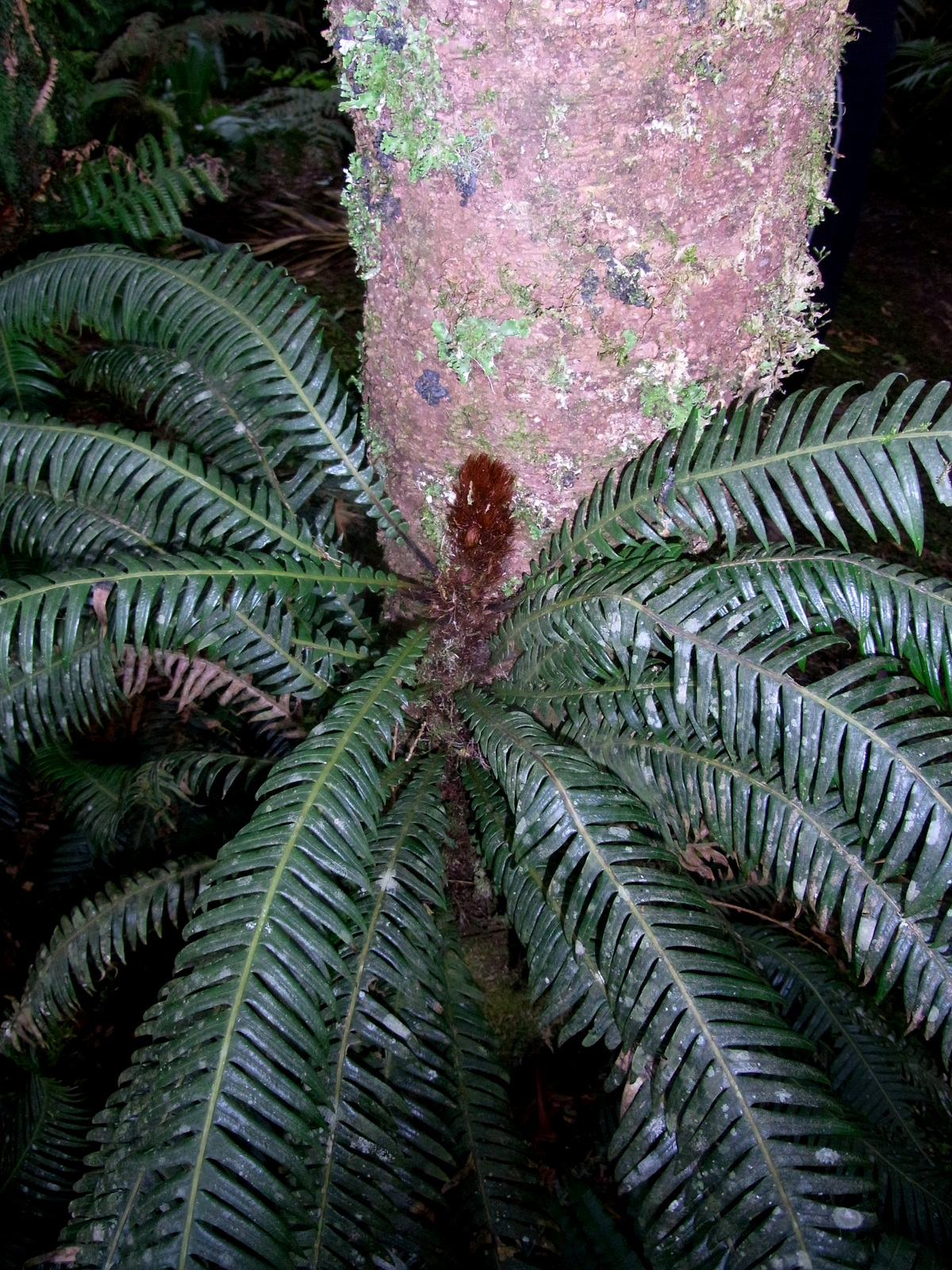

Scientific classification
- Kingdom: Plantae
- Clade: Tracheophytes
- Division: Polypodiophyta
- Class: Polypodiopsida
- Order: Polypodiales
- Suborder: Aspleniineae
- Family: Blechnaceae
- Genus: Lomaridium
- Species: L. contiguum

Binomial name
- Lomaridium contiguum (Mett.) Gasper & V.A.O.Dittrich

Synonyms
- Blechnum castaneum Copel.; Blechnum contiguum Mett.; Blechnum pseudovulcanicum C.Chr.; Lomaria contigua (Mett.) Carruth.; Struthiopteris contigua (Mett.) Ching

= Lomaridium contiguum =

Species of fern

Lomaridium contiguum, synonym Blechnum contiguum, is a fern in the family Blechnaceae. The specific epithet refers to the contiguous lobes of the fronds.

== Description ==
The plant is a climbing epiphytic fern. Its rhizome is long and covered with dense, narrowly lanceolate scales. Its fronds are 30–50 cm or more long and 5–12 cm wide.

== Distribution and habitat ==
The fern is found on Australia's subtropical Lord Howe Island in the Tasman Sea, as well as on New Caledonia. On Lord Howe it is common in the cloud forest on the summits of Mounts Gower and Lidgbird.
