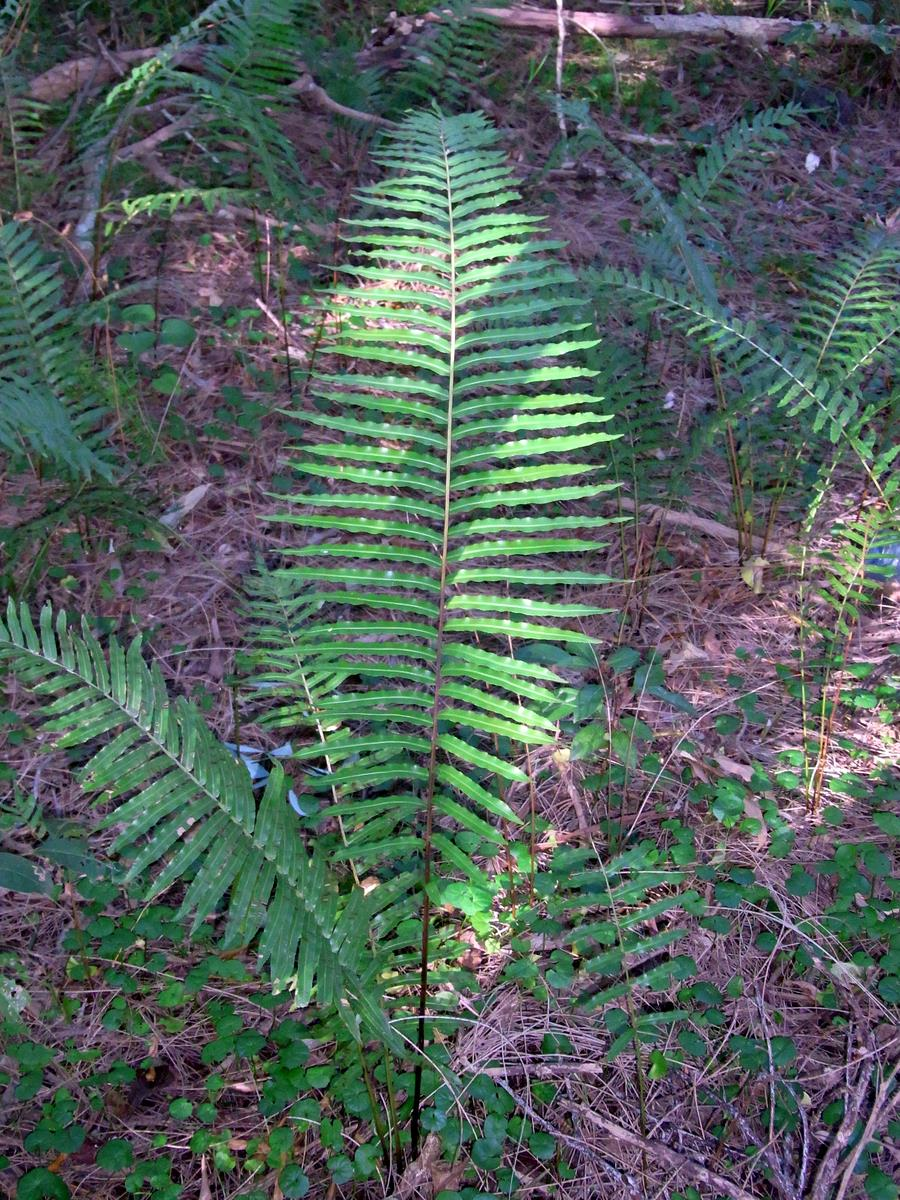
- Growing near Botany Bay, Australia

Scientific classification
- Kingdom: Plantae
- Clade: Tracheophytes
- Division: Polypodiophyta
- Class: Polypodiopsida
- Order: Polypodiales
- Suborder: Aspleniineae
- Family: Blechnaceae
- Genus: Telmatoblechnum
- Species: T. indicum

Binomial name
- Telmatoblechnum indicum (Burm.f.) Perrie, D.J.Ohlsen & Brownsey

Synonyms
- Blechnopsis denticulata (Sw.) C.Presl; Blechnopsis malaccensis (Fée) C.Presl; Blechnopsis striata (R.Br.) C.Presl; Blechnum angustatum Schrad.; Blechnum angustifolium Willd.; Blechnum calophyllum Langsd.& Fisch.; Blechnum cumingianum Trevis.; Blechnum denticulatum Sw.; Blechnum indicum Burm.; Blechnum malaccense Fée; Blechnum moluccanum Desv.; Blechnum squamulosum Kaulf.; Blechnum stagninum Raddi; Blechnum stramineum Labill.; Blechnum striatum R.Br.; Salpichlaena denticulata (Sw.) Trevis.; Salpichlaena malaccensis (Fée) Trevis.; Salpichlaena striata (R.Br.) Trevis.

= Telmatoblechnum indicum =

Swamp water fern

Species of fern

Telmatoblechnum indicum (many synonyms including Blechnum indicum) or the swamp water fern is often seen growing on sandy soils in swampy areas. The specific epithet indicum is from Latin, revealing this plant was first collected in the East Indies (Java). Indigenous Australians used the starchy rhizome as food.

This plant was collected with another swamp fern Cyclosorus interruptus by Joseph Banks and Daniel Solander at Botany Bay in 1770.
