= Hidden Waters Preserve =

Nature reserve on Country Club Road near Eustis, Florida

- Location within Florida
- Location: Lake County, Florida, United States
- Nearest city: Eustis, Florida
- Coordinates: 28°50′17″N 81°39′29″W
- Area: 90 acres (36 ha)
- Established: 1996
- Governing body: Lake County Water Authority

Hidden Waters Preserve is a nature reserve located on Country Club Road near Eustis, Florida.

== Environment ==
The entire preserve is a 105 foot deep sinkhole. At the center of it is Lake Alfred a sinkhole lake. An old growth Hardwood Hammock on the eastern side of the preserve shelters a deep ravine formed by erosion which feeds Lake Alfred from nearby Lake Irma and Joanna. The Hardwood Hammock's canopy is dominated by American sweetgum (Liquidambar styraciflua), Pignut Hickory (Carya glabra), southern magnolia (Magnolia grandiflora), Laurel Oak (Quercus hemisphaerica). Plants common in the understory are Elderberry, Royal Fern (Osmunda spectabilis), Netted Chain Fern (Lorinseria), and water oak (Quercus nigra ). Around the edge of the preserve are Sandhills full of young Longleaf Pines these Pines replaced Longleaf Pines that were logged. In the Sandhill habitat there are Gopher Tortoise burrows, which can be seen when hiking in the preserve. The Common wildlife of the preserve are gopher tortoises, raccoons, ducks, foxes, and hawks.

== History ==
When the area was first settled the Sandhills community was logged for its Longleaf Pines, only the Hardwood Hammock on the eastern slopes of Lake Alfred was left. On January 24, 1922, the Lake County Country Club opened on the site, and the area around Lake Alfred became a golf course. In the 1940s the country club closed. In the 1950s the area around Lake Alfred was used for citrus groves until the freezes of the 1980s. Afterwards Lake Alfred was used as an illegal dump. In 1996 the Lake County Water Authority purchased the land and it became Hidden Waters Preserve. Hiking trails were added for people to enjoy.
