= Lomaridium dendrophilum =

Conservation status
- Data Deficient (IUCN 3.1)

Scientific classification
- Kingdom: Plantae
- Clade: Tracheophytes
- Division: Polypodiophyta
- Class: Polypodiopsida
- Order: Polypodiales
- Suborder: Aspleniineae
- Family: Blechnaceae
- Genus: Lomaridium
- Species: L. dendrophilum

Binomial name
- Lomaridium dendrophilum (Sodiro) Gasper & V.A.O.Dittrich

Synonyms
- Blechnum dendrophilum (Sodiro) C.Chr.; Lomaria dendrophila Sodiro

Species of fern

Lomaridium dendrophilum, synonym Blechnum dendrophilum, is a species of fern in the family Blechnaceae. It is endemic to Ecuador and known only from Napo Province and Pichincha Province. It was first described by Luis Sodiro in the late 19th century. Although there are no known conservation measures, it has been recorded from Illinizas Ecological Reserve.

Its natural habitat is subtropical or tropical moist montane forests. It is threatened by habitat loss for agriculture.
