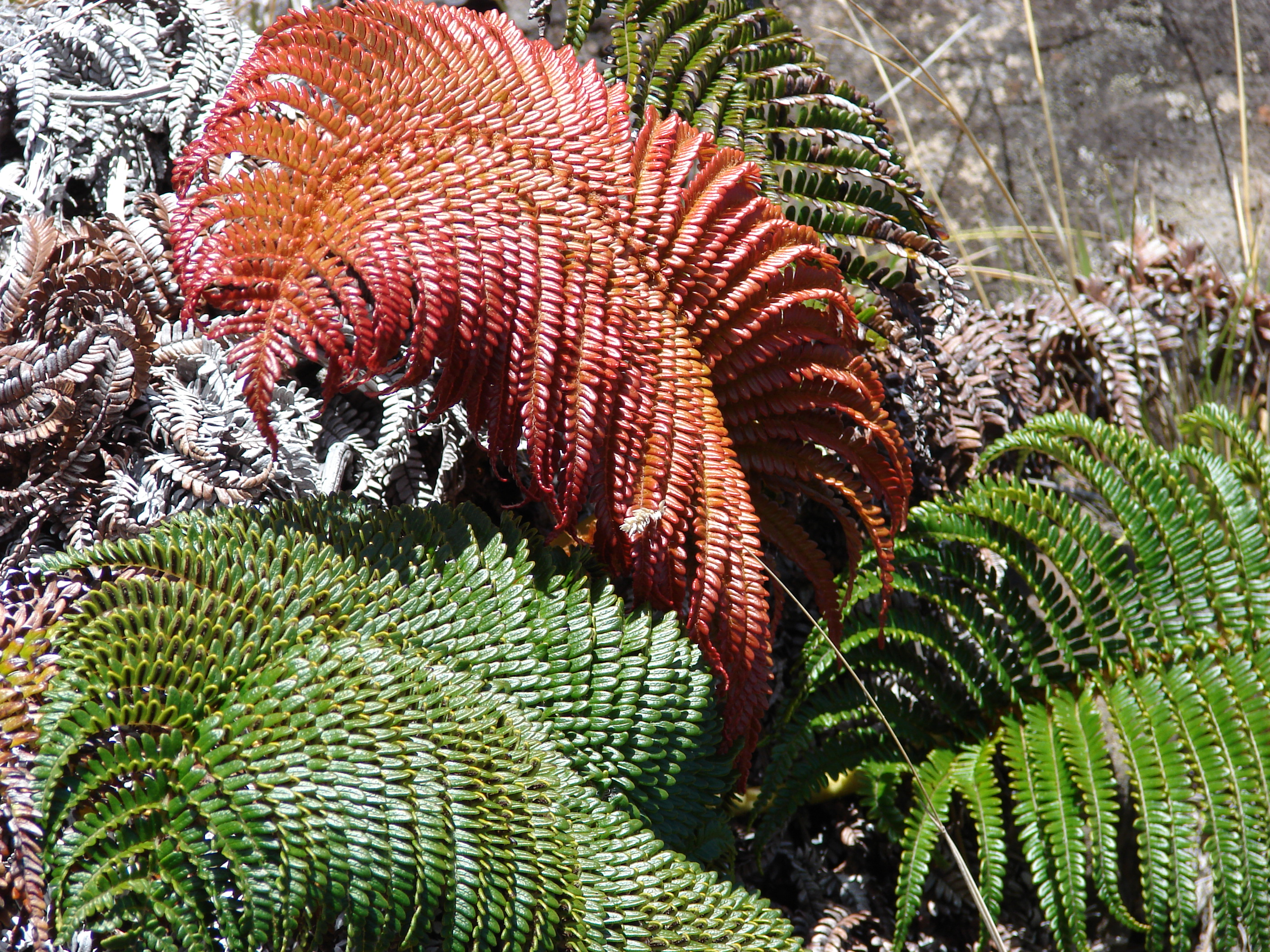

Conservation status
- Vulnerable (NatureServe)

Scientific classification
- Kingdom: Plantae
- Clade: Tracheophytes
- Division: Polypodiophyta
- Class: Polypodiopsida
- Order: Polypodiales
- Suborder: Aspleniineae
- Family: Blechnaceae
- Genus: Sadleria
- Species: S. cyatheoides

Binomial name
- Sadleria cyatheoides Kaulf.

Synonyms
- Blechnum fontanesianum Gaudich.; Blechnum kaulfussianum Gaudich.; Blechnum cyatheoides (Kaulf.) Christenh.; Woodwardia cyatheoides (Kaulf.) Mett.

= Sadleria cyatheoides =

Species of plant

Sadleria cyatheoides, commonly known as ʻamaʻumaʻu fern or ʻamaʻu, is a fern species in the family Blechnaceae.

== Description ==
Reaching a height of 0.9–1.5 m (3–5 ft) and a trunk diameter of 7.5–10 cm (3–4 in), ʻamaʻu resembles a small tree fern.

The young fronds are often tinged red to block harmful sunlight.

== Distribution and habitat ==
It is endemic to Hawaii and inhabits lava flows, open areas, and wet forests on all major islands up to an altitude of 1,676 m (5,499 ft).

== Uses ==
Its pith and young fronds are edible either roasted or steamed.

== In culture ==
Kīlauea's Halemaʻumaʻu is named for this species.
