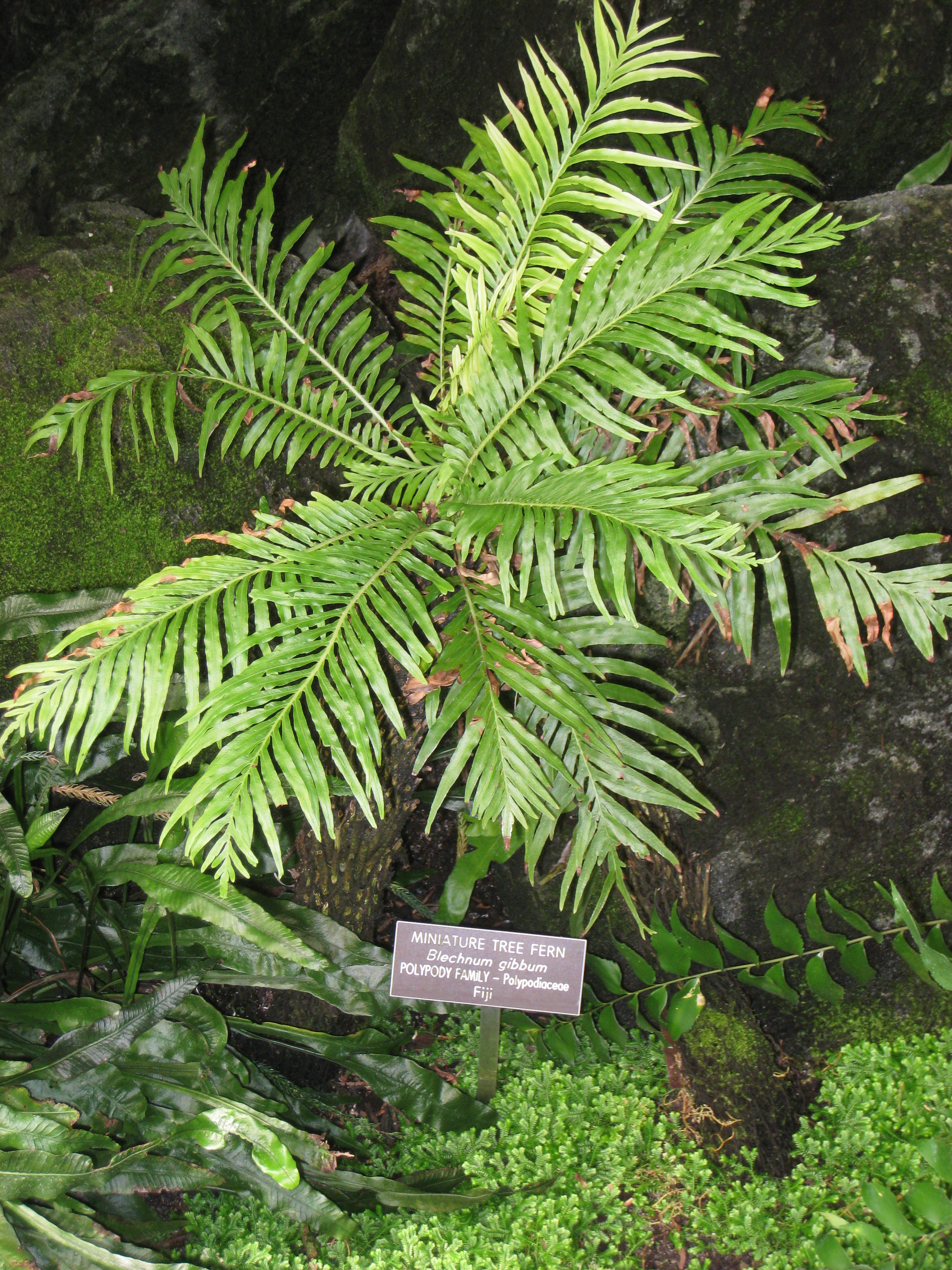
- Growing in Washington DC

Scientific classification
- Kingdom: Plantae
- Clade: Tracheophytes
- Division: Polypodiophyta
- Class: Polypodiopsida
- Order: Polypodiales
- Suborder: Aspleniineae
- Family: Blechnaceae
- Genus: Oceaniopteris
- Species: O. gibba

Binomial name
- Oceaniopteris gibba (Labill.) Gasper & Salino

Synonyms
- Blechnum neocaledonicum (Linden & E.Fourn.) Salomon; Blechnum gibbum (Labill.) Mett.; Lomaria gibba Labill.; Lomaria neocaledonica Linden & E.Fourn.; Struthiopteris gibba (Labill.) Ching

= Oceaniopteris gibba =

Species of fern

Oceaniopteris gibba, the miniature tree fern (syn. Blechnum gibbum), is a tropical species of fern in the family Blechnaceae, native to New Caledonia and introduced in Fiji. It has received the Royal Horticultural Society's Award of Garden Merit.

It grows to 1–2 m (3.3–6.6 ft). With a vertical "trunk" (actually a rhizome), it has bright green fronds. As it does not tolerate temperatures below 15 °C (59 °F), in temperate zones it must be cultivated under glass all year round. It is a suitable subject for a greenhouse or conservatory. It requires an acid soil and a partially shaded position.

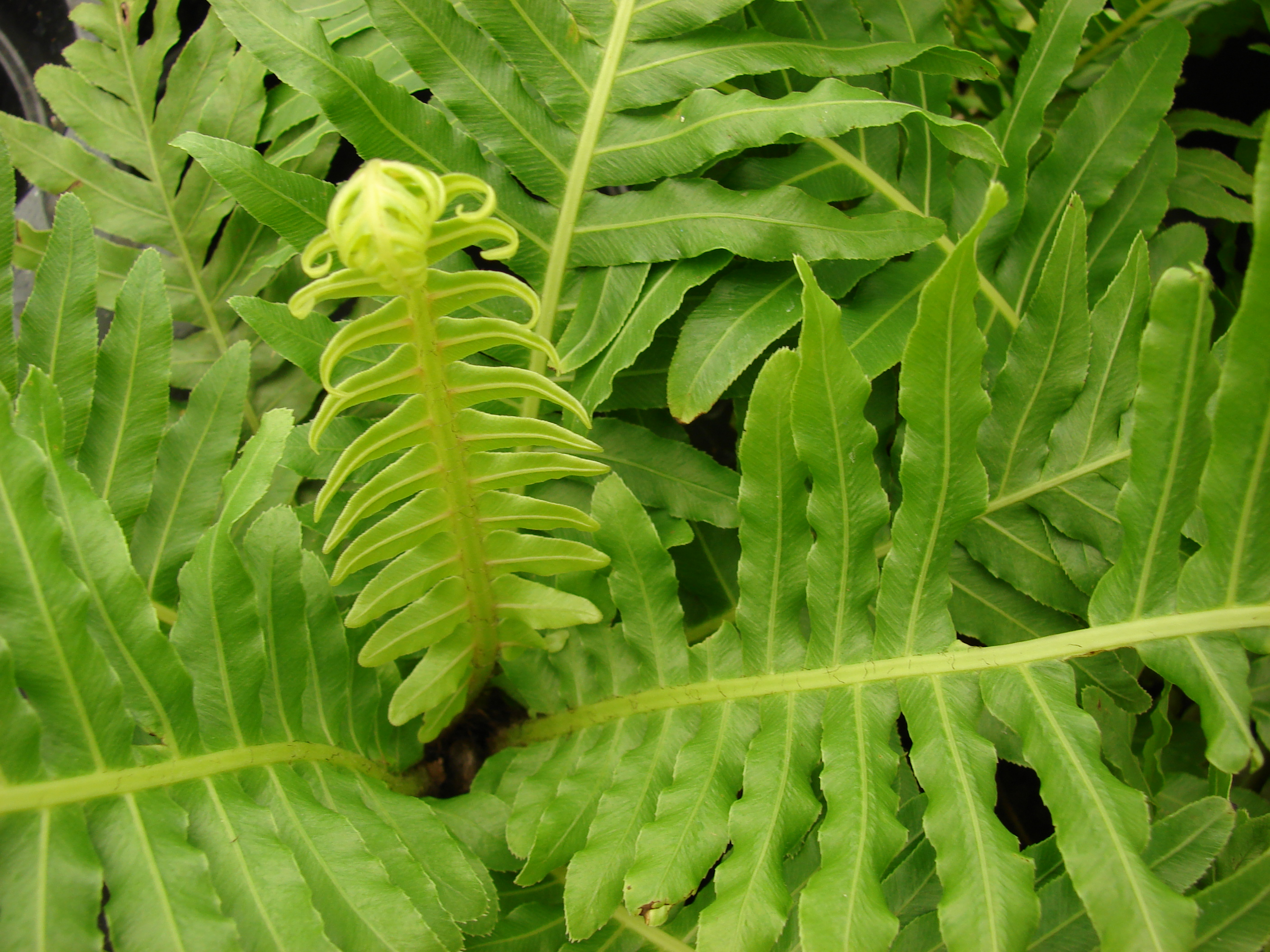
Detail
