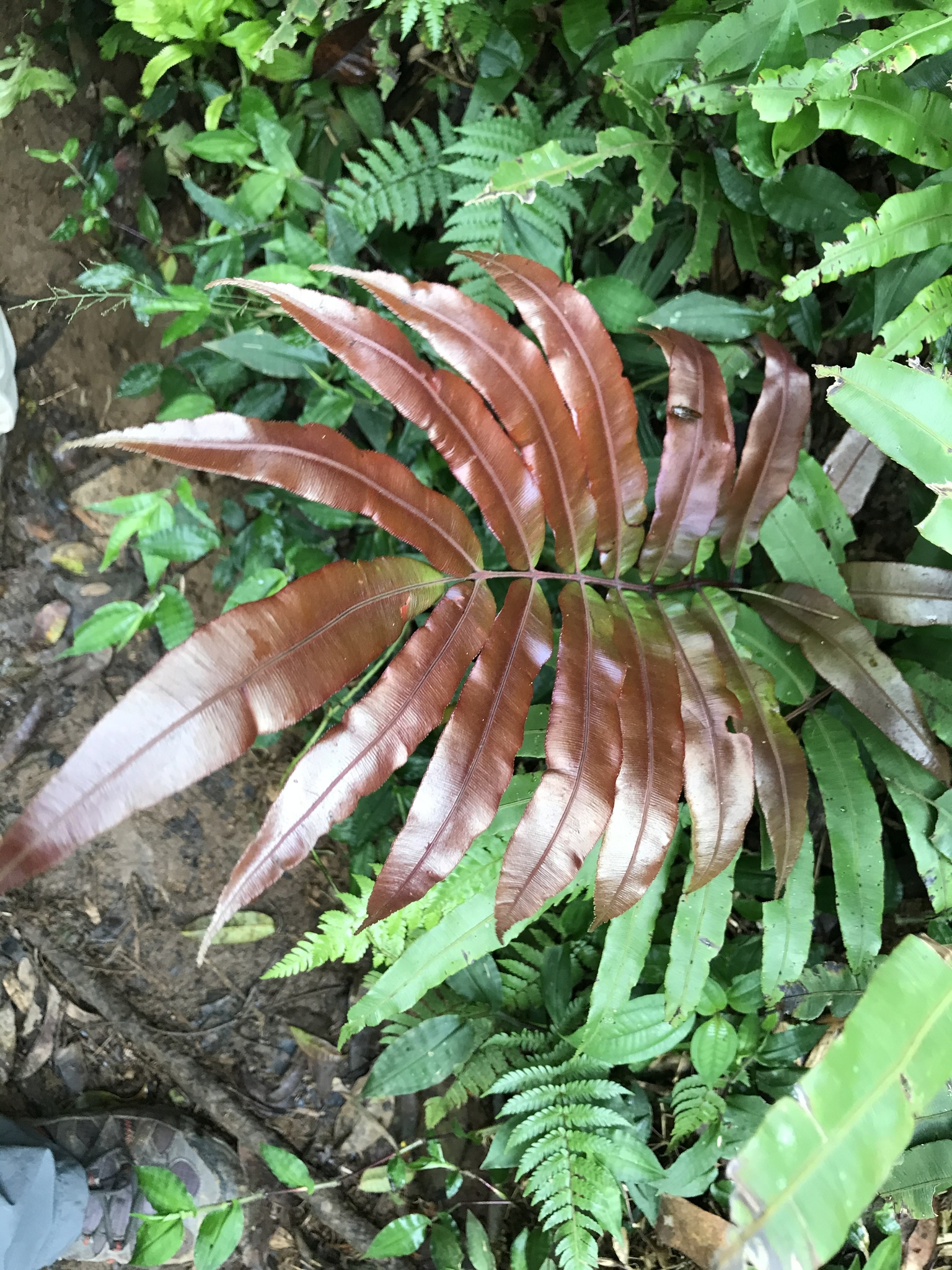

Scientific classification
- Kingdom: Plantae
- Clade: Tracheophytes
- Division: Polypodiophyta
- Class: Polypodiopsida
- Order: Polypodiales
- Suborder: Aspleniineae
- Family: Blechnaceae
- Genus: Salpichlaena
- Species: S. volubilis

Binomial name
- Salpichlaena volubilis (Kaulf.) J.Sm.

= Salpichlaena volubilis =

Species of fern

Salpichlaena volubilis is a species of fern belonging to the family Blechnaceae. It is native to the Magdalena River Basin of Colombia. It has pinnate fronds which can exceed 12 m (39 ft) long, but less than 30 cm (12 in) wide, and it climbs by twining.
