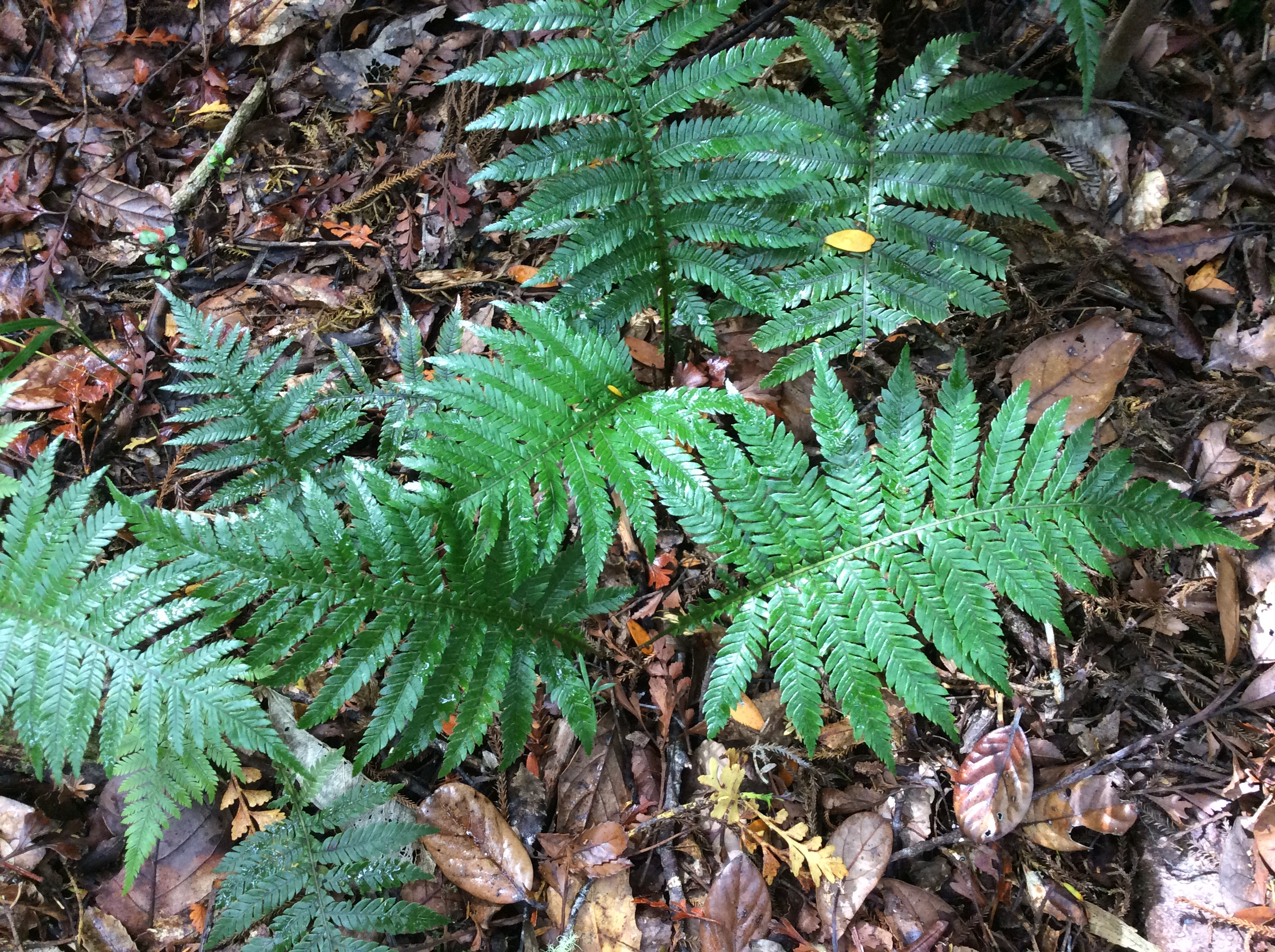

Scientific classification
- Kingdom: Plantae
- Clade: Tracheophytes
- Division: Polypodiophyta
- Class: Polypodiopsida
- Order: Polypodiales
- Suborder: Aspleniineae
- Family: Blechnaceae
- Genus: Diploblechnum
- Species: D. fraseri

Binomial name
- Diploblechnum fraseri (A.Cunn.) Luerss.

Synonyms
- Blechnum integripinnulum Hayata; Blechnum fraseri (A.Cunn.) Luerss.; Diploblechnum integripinnulum (Hayata) Hayata; Lomaria fraseri A.Cunn.; Spicanta fraseri (A.Cunn.) Kuntze; Struthiopteris fraseri (A.Cunn.) Ching; Struthiopteris integripinnula (Hayata) Ching

= Diploblechnum fraseri =

Species of fern

Diploblechnum fraseri, synonym Blechnum fraseri, known commonly as the miniature tree fern and by its Māori name maukurangi, is a species of fern in the family Blechnaceae native to New Zealand, Malesia and Taiwan.

== Distribution ==
Diploblechnum fraseri is found in New Zealand, Malesia and Taiwan.

=== New Zealand ===
Its North Island range spans from Te Paki in Northland to near Mokau in Waikato. Its South Island range is limited to north-west Nelson.
