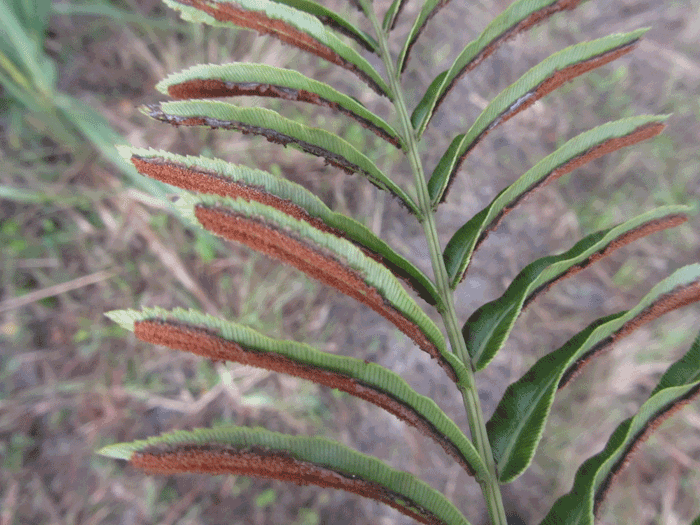
- Underside of frond
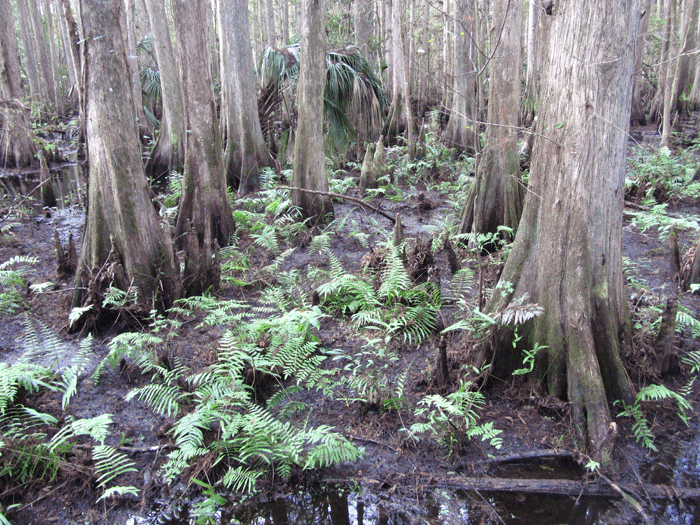
- With Taxodium distichum

Scientific classification
- Kingdom: Plantae
- Clade: Tracheophytes
- Division: Polypodiophyta
- Class: Polypodiopsida
- Order: Polypodiales
- Suborder: Aspleniineae
- Family: Blechnaceae
- Genus: Telmatoblechnum
- Species: T. serrulatum

Binomial name
- Telmatoblechnum serrulatum (Rich.) Perrie, D.J.Ohlsen & Brownsey
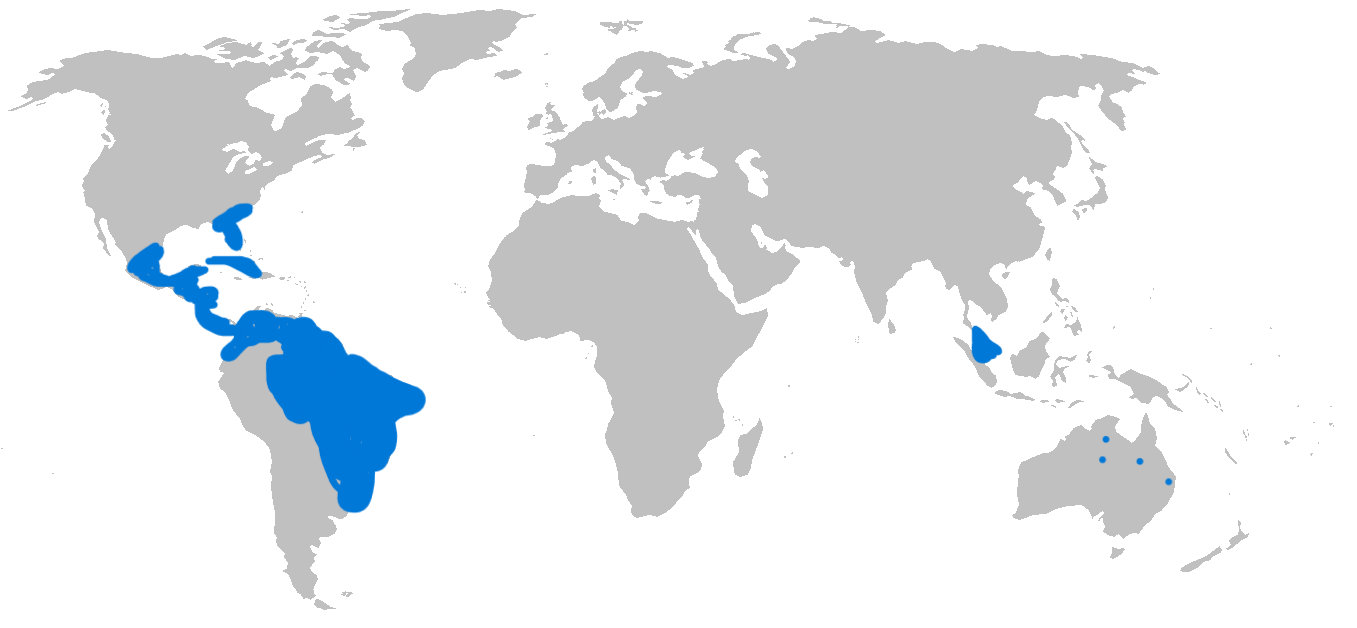
- Swamp Fern Range

Synonyms
- List: Blechnopsis serrulata (Rich.) C.Presl; Blechnum serrulatum Rich.; Blechnum serrulatum var. crespianum Bosco; Blechnum serrulatum var. distans Christ; Blechnum serrulatum f. nanum Hassl.; Blechnum serrulatum var. stierii (Rosenst.) Rosenst.; Blechnum stierii Rosenst.; Salpichlaena serrulata (Rich.) Trevis.; Spicanta serrulata (Rich.) Kuntze

= Telmatoblechnum serrulatum =

Species of fern

Telmatoblechnum serrulatum, the toothed midsorus fern, is a species of fern in the family Blechnaceae, native to Florida, southeastern Mexico, Central America, the Caribbean, northern and western South America, Brazil, Paraguay, and northeastern Argentina.

== Ecology and habitat ==
The species is commonly found in freshwater marsh and swamp conditions in tropical or subtropical locations. It can also be found wet prairies, moist pine woods, and sometimes in forests Specifically, in Florida the recorded habitat for this fern is moist and shady places. The range for this fern species is from Florida to South America and has been recorded in Malaysia and Australia.

It has shown good resistance to lead contamination when growing on coal mine tailings.

== Description ==
This fern is comparable to other ferns that consist of a stipe growing from the rhizomes and pinnae growing from the rachis. The entire above-ground specimen is called the frond. The fronds for this species are monomorphic and typically are about 30-50 cm in length and 7-16 cm wide. This means that this fern can grow a bit more than four feet tall. At the base, the stipe is usually light brown, sometimes darker at the base, typically 10-70 cm long, and appears cylindrical. The rhizomes form horizontally, even sometimes climbing tree trunks, and are covered in dark brown scales. There is the presence of spores which are located on the underside of the pinnae, usually tan to brown in color. Additionally, there is a central costa that runs the length of the pinnae.

== Conservation ==
This fern species has not been evaluated for conservation measures. However, this species has been utilized for wetland restoration projects.
