= Cleistoblechnum =

Conservation status
- Vulnerable (IUCN 3.1)

Scientific classification
- Kingdom: Plantae
- Clade: Tracheophytes
- Division: Polypodiophyta
- Class: Polypodiopsida
- Order: Polypodiales
- Suborder: Aspleniineae
- Family: Blechnaceae
- Genus: Cleistoblechnum; Gasper & Salino
- Species: C. eburneum

Binomial name
- Cleistoblechnum eburneum (Christ) Gasper & Salino

Genus of ferns

Cleistoblechnum is a genus of ferns in the family Blechnaceae, subfamily Blechnoideae, with a single species Cleistoblechnum eburneum, according to the Pteridophyte Phylogeny Group classification of 2016 (PPG I). The genus is accepted in a 2016 classification of the family Blechnaceae, but other sources sink it into a very broadly defined Blechnum, equivalent to the whole of the PPG I subfamily.

The natural habitat of Cleistoblechnum eburneum is subtropical or tropical moist lowland forests. It is threatened by habitat loss. It is native to China and Taiwan.
