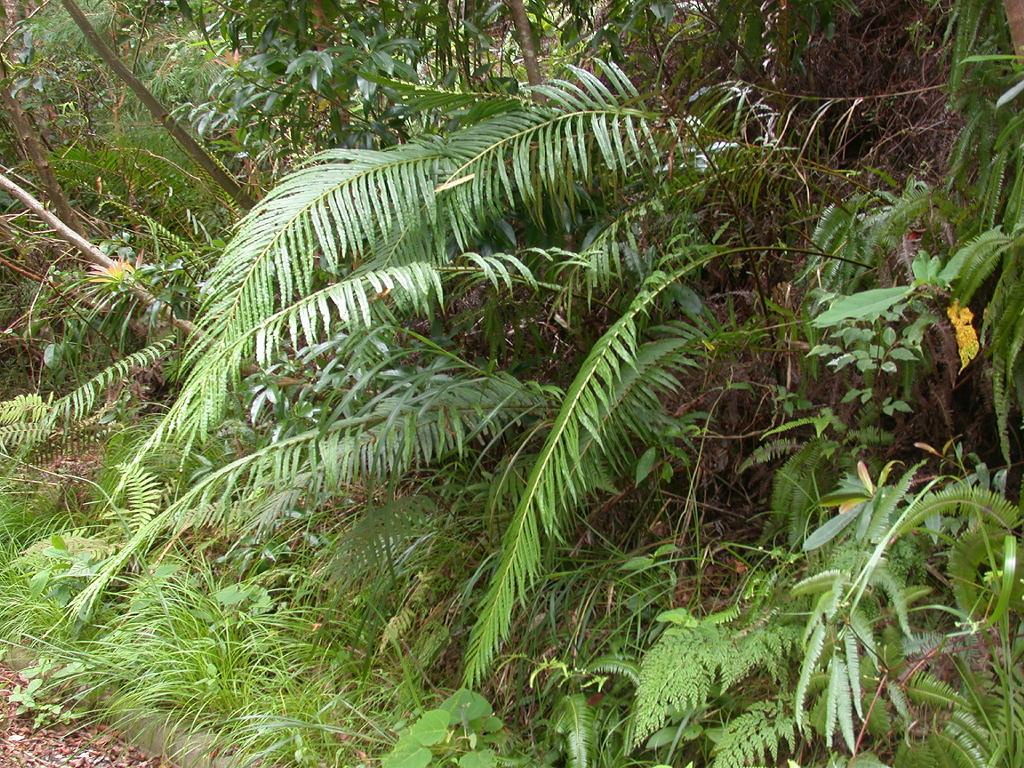
- Blechnopsis orientalis

Scientific classification
- Kingdom: Plantae
- Clade: Tracheophytes
- Division: Polypodiophyta
- Class: Polypodiopsida
- Order: Polypodiales
- Suborder: Aspleniineae
- Family: Blechnaceae
- Subfamily: Blechnoideae
- Genus: Blechnopsis; C.Presl

Species
- See text.

= Blechnopsis =

Genus of ferns

Blechnopsis is a small genus of ferns in the family Blechnaceae, subfamily Blechnoideae, according to the Pteridophyte Phylogeny Group classification of 2016 (PPG I). The genus is accepted in a 2016 classification of the family Blechnaceae, but other sources sink it into a very broadly defined Blechnum, equivalent to the whole of the PPG I subfamily.

== Species ==
As of July 2025, using the PPG I classification system, the Checklist of Ferns and Lycophytes of the World accepted two species:

- Blechnopsis finlaysoniana (Wall. ex Hook. & Grev.) C.Presl
- Blechnopsis orientalis (L.) C.Presl
