= Blechnidium =

Scientific classification
- Kingdom: Plantae
- Clade: Tracheophytes
- Division: Polypodiophyta
- Class: Polypodiopsida
- Order: Polypodiales
- Suborder: Aspleniineae
- Family: Blechnaceae
- Genus: Blechnidium; T.Moore
- Species: B. melanopus

Binomial name
- Blechnidium melanopus (Hook.) T.Moore

Genus of ferns

Blechnidium is a genus of ferns in the family Blechnaceae, subfamily Blechnoideae, with a single species Blechnidium melanopus, according to the Pteridophyte Phylogeny Group classification of 2016 (PPG I). The genus is accepted in a 2016 classification of the family Blechnaceae, but other sources sink it into a very broadly defined Blechnum, equivalent to the whole of the PPG I subfamily.
