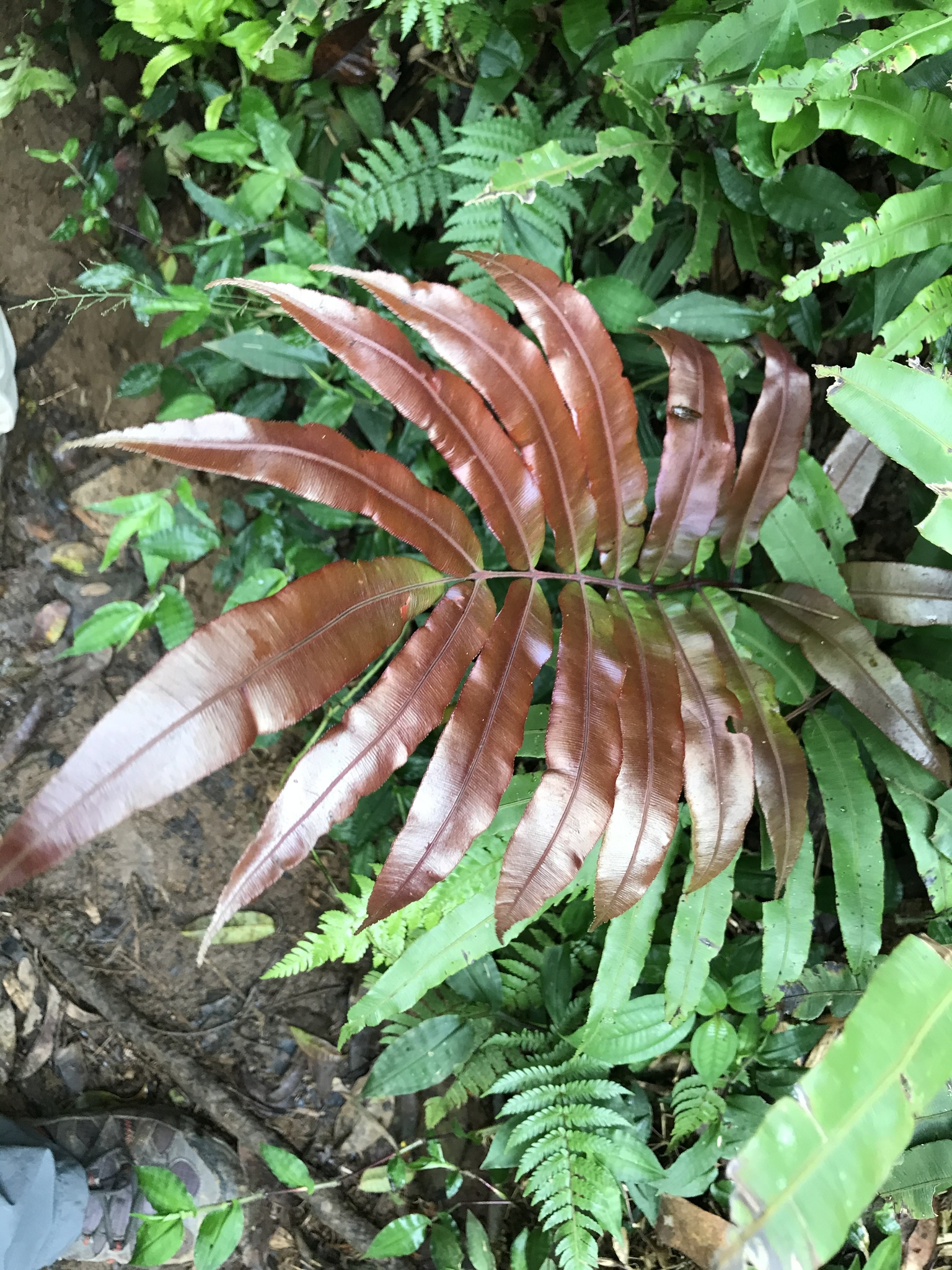
- Salpichlaena volubilis

Scientific classification
- Kingdom: Plantae
- Clade: Tracheophytes
- Division: Polypodiophyta
- Class: Polypodiopsida
- Order: Polypodiales
- Suborder: Aspleniineae
- Family: Blechnaceae
- Subfamily: Stenochlaenoideae
- Genus: Salpichlaena; J. Sm.

Species
- see text

= Salpichlaena =

Genus of ferns

Salpichlaena is a genus containing two species of fern in the family Blechnaceae. Species of the genus are native to Central and South America. These ferns have climbing leaves with a rachis that twines around tree branches and other supports.

== Description ==
Terrestrial climbers with creeping, scaly rhizomes. Leaves are monomorphic to dimorphic and glabrous. The blade is 2-pinnate, with alternate, imparipinnate pinnae. Pinnules are entire or serrated at the apex and pedunculated. The rachis can grow up to 15 meters, is highly climbing, and voluble. Veins are simple or 1-forked near the base, connected by a submarginal branch. Sori are deciduous, leaving an apparently sterile pinnule. The indusium is tubular, dark brown, splitting irregularly, and breaking into fragments. It has a chromosome number of x=40.

Salpichlaena is characterized by its climbing rachis, entire pinnules, and sori elongated by the ribs. The only other genus in Mesoamerica with a climbing rachis is Lygodium, which differs by the arrangement of sori along the margins

== Taxonomy ==
The genus was described by botanist John Smith and published in the Journal of Botany, being a second series of the Botanical Miscellany 4: 168, in 1841. The type species is Salpichlaena volubilis (Kaulf.) Hook.

Species

As of September 2024, Plants of the World Online accepts the following species:

Image	Scientific name	Distribution
	Salpichlaena hookeriana Alston	Bolivia, Brazil North, Brazil West-Central, Colombia, Guyana, Peru, Venezuela
	Salpichlaena hybrida Lehtonen, G.G.Cárdenas & Tuomisto	Guianas to Brazil (Roraima)
	Salpichlaena papyrus G.G.Cárdenas, Tuomisto & Lehtonen	Bolivia, Brazil West-Central, Colombia, Costa Rica, Ecuador, French Guiana, Guyana, Nicaragua, Panamá, Paraguay, Peru, Venezuela
	Salpichlaena volubilis (Kaulf.) J.Sm.	Belize, Bolivia, Brazil North, Brazil Northeast, Brazil South, Brazil Southeast, Colombia, Costa Rica, Ecuador, French Guiana, Guyana, Honduras, Leeward Is., Nicaragua, Panamá, Peru, Suriname, Trinidad-Tobago, Venezuela, Windward Is.
