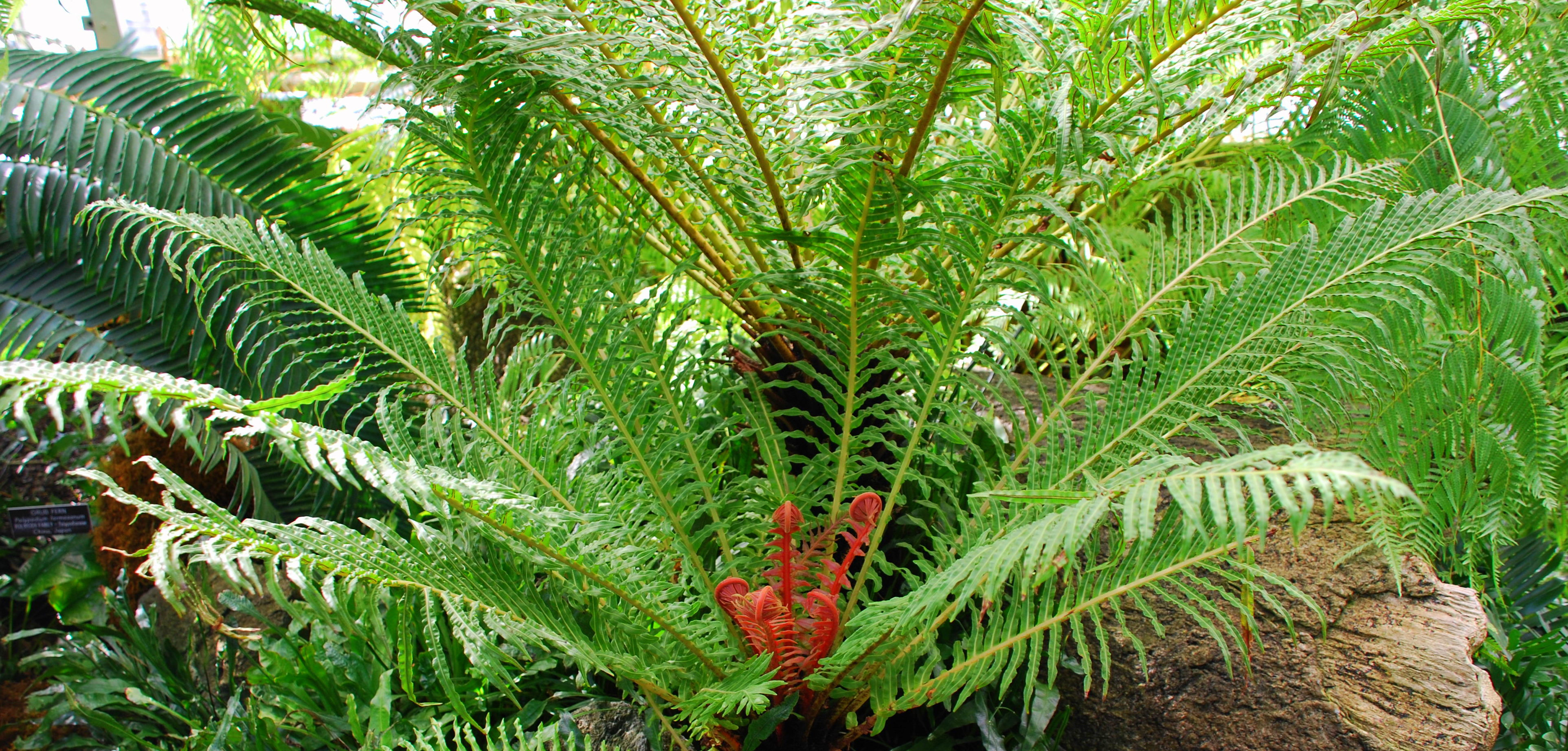

Scientific classification
- Kingdom: Plantae
- Clade: Tracheophytes
- Division: Polypodiophyta
- Class: Polypodiopsida
- Order: Polypodiales
- Suborder: Aspleniineae
- Family: Blechnaceae
- Genus: Neoblechnum; Gasper & V.A.O.Dittrich
- Species: N. brasiliense

Binomial name
- Neoblechnum brasiliense (Desv.) Gasper & V.A.O.Dittrich

Synonyms
- Blechnopsis brasiliensis (Desv.) C.Presl; Blechnum brasiliense Desv.; Blechnum corcovadense Raddi; Blechnum fluminense Vell.; Blechnum nigrosquamatum Gilbert; Blechnum nitidum C.Presl; Blechnum validum Fée; Salpichlaena brasiliensis (Desv.) Trevis.; Spicanta brasiliense (Desv.) Kuntze

= Neoblechnum =

Genus of ferns

Neoblechnum is a genus of ferns in the family Blechnaceae, subfamily Blechnoideae, with a single species Neoblechnum brasiliense, according to the Pteridophyte Phylogeny Group classification of 2016 (PPG I). The genus is accepted in a 2016 classification of the family Blechnaceae, but other sources sink it into a very broadly defined Blechnum, equivalent to the whole of the PPG I subfamily; the species is then known as Blechnum brasiliense. It is called Brazilian dwarf tree fern, red Brazilian tree fern, and red dwarf tree fern.

== Description ==
The erect rhizome of Neoblechnum brasiliense forms a thin stipe-stubbed trunk up to 30 centimetres (12 in) in height. The new foliage is a striking deep red color. As the fronds mature it turns to a glossy green. On some selections, the new fronds emerge a pinkish-red.

== Distribution ==
The fern is native to the warm and humid subtropical forests of South America.

Habitats include:

- the Atlantic Forest biome, within southeastern Brazil, Uruguay, and the interiors of Argentina and Paraguay.
- the Amazon region, in Brazil, Peru, Bolivia, Colombia, Ecuador, Venezuela, and Guyana.
- Guatemala.

== Cultivation ==
Neoblechnum brasiliense is cultivated as an ornamental plant. In the UK (under the synonym Blechnum brasiliense) it has gained the Royal Horticultural Society's Award of Garden Merit. As it will not tolerate temperatures below 15 °C (59 °F) it must be grown under glass all year in temperate regions.

=== Cultivars ===
Named cultivars include:

- 'Crispum' — segments have prominently crisped margins
- 'Cristatum' — segments are crested
- 'Volcano' — red dwarf tree fern, new foliage is red

== Gallery ==
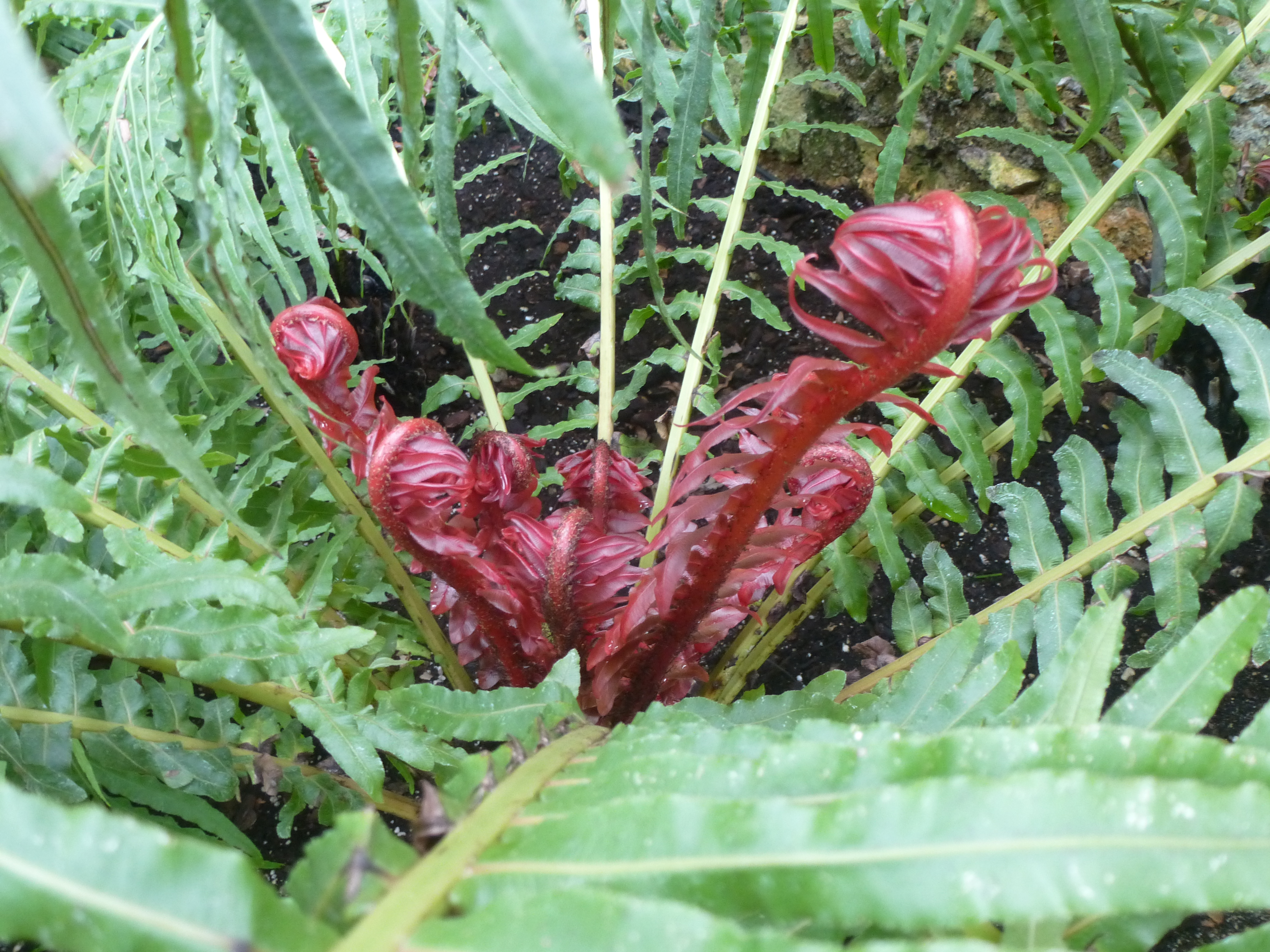
New red fronds emerging, Jardin des Plantes conservatory

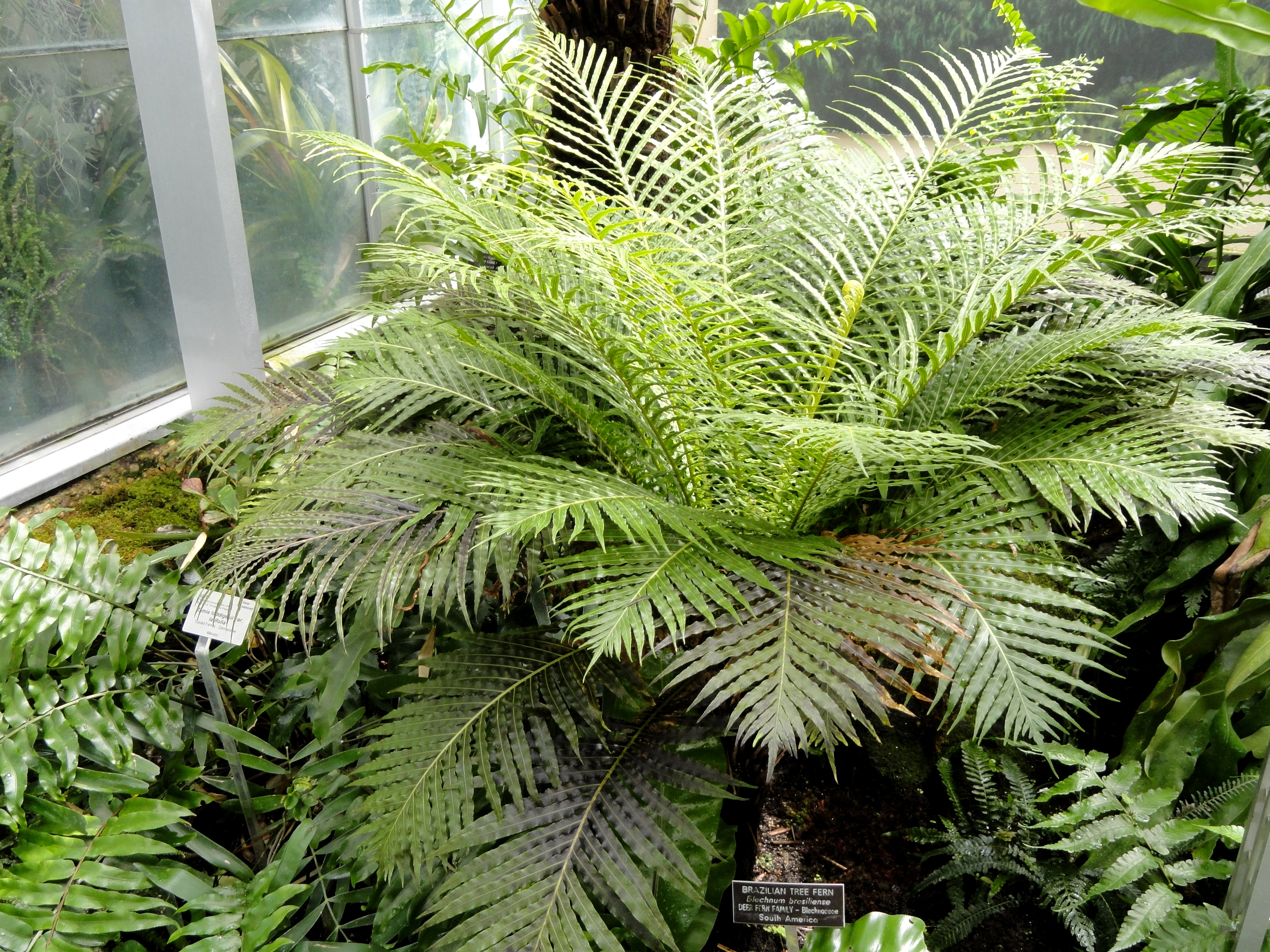
Specimen in the United States Botanic Garden conservatory

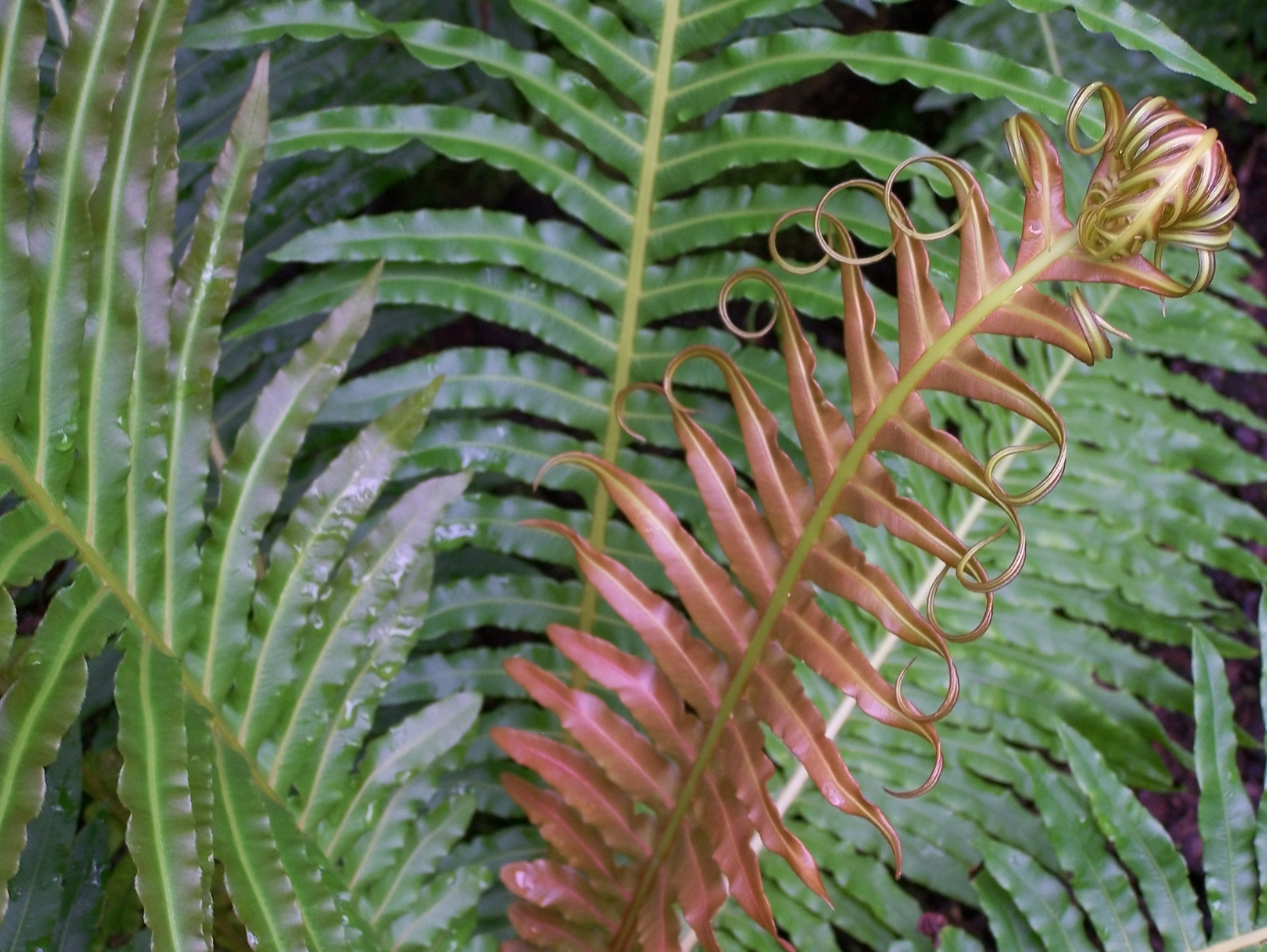
