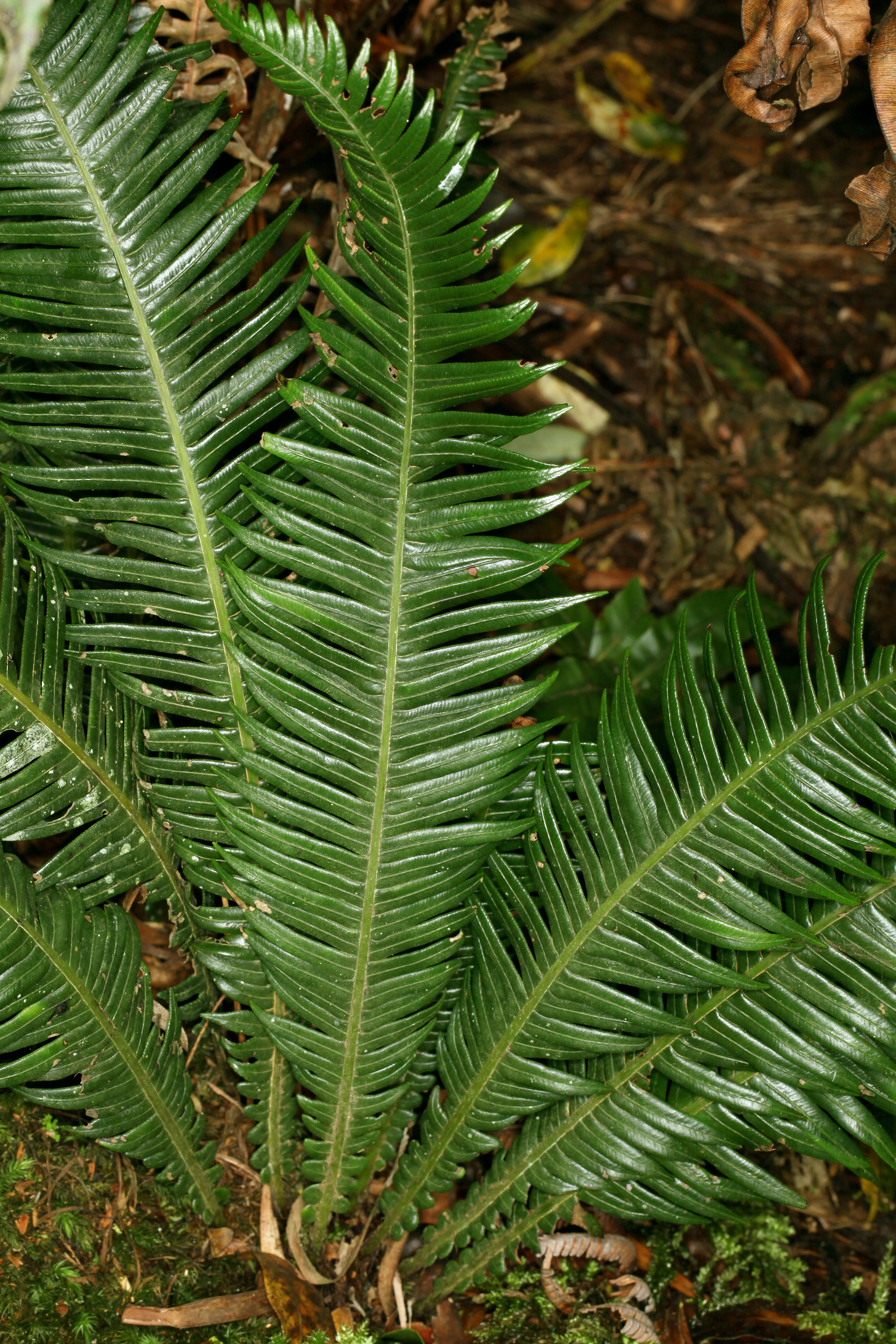
- Lomaridium contiguum. On Lord Howe, this fern is confined to cloud forest on Mount Gower (as seen here) and Mount Lidgbird. It also occurs in New Caledonia, and is unusual in its climbing epiphytic habit, starting on the ground.

Scientific classification
- Kingdom: Plantae
- Clade: Tracheophytes
- Division: Polypodiophyta
- Class: Polypodiopsida
- Order: Polypodiales
- Suborder: Aspleniineae
- Family: Blechnaceae
- Subfamily: Blechnoideae
- Genus: Lomaridium; C.Presl

Species
- See text.

= Lomaridium =

Genus of ferns

Lomaridium is a genus of ferns in the family Blechnaceae, subfamily Blechnoideae, according to the Pteridophyte Phylogeny Group classification of 2016 (PPG I). The genus is accepted in a 2016 classification of the family Blechnaceae, but other sources sink it into a very broadly defined Blechnum, equivalent to the whole of the PPG I subfamily.

== Species ==
As of July 2025, using the PPG I classification system, the Checklist of Ferns and Lycophytes of the World accepted the following sixteen species:

- Lomaridium acutum (Desv.) Gasper & V.A.O.Dittrich
- Lomaridium angustifolium (Kunth) Vicent & G.Y Galán
- Lomaridium attenuatum (Sw.) Gasper & V.A.O.Dittrich
- Lomaridium biforme (Baker) Gasper & V.A.O.Dittrich
- Lomaridium binervatum (Poir.) Gasper & V.A.O.Dittrich
- Lomaridium bonapartei (Rakotondr.) Gasper & V.A.O.Dittrich
- Lomaridium contiguum (Mett.) Gasper & V.A.O.Dittrich
- Lomaridium dendrophilum (Sodiro) Gasper & V.A.O.Dittrich
- Lomaridium ensiforme (Liebm.) Gasper & V.A.O.Dittrich
- Lomaridium fragile (Liebm.) Gasper & V.A.O.Dittrich
- Lomaridium fuscosquamosum (A.Rojas) Gasper & V.A.O.Dittrich
- Lomaridium nigrocostatum (A.Rojas) Gasper & V.A.O.Dittrich
- Lomaridium pteropus (Kunze) Gasper & V.A.O.Dittrich
- Lomaridium schottii (Colla) Gasper & V.A.O.Dittrich
- Lomaridium simillimum (Baker) Gasper & V.A.O.Dittrich
- Lomaridium xiphophyllum (Baker) Gasper & V.A.O.Dittrich
