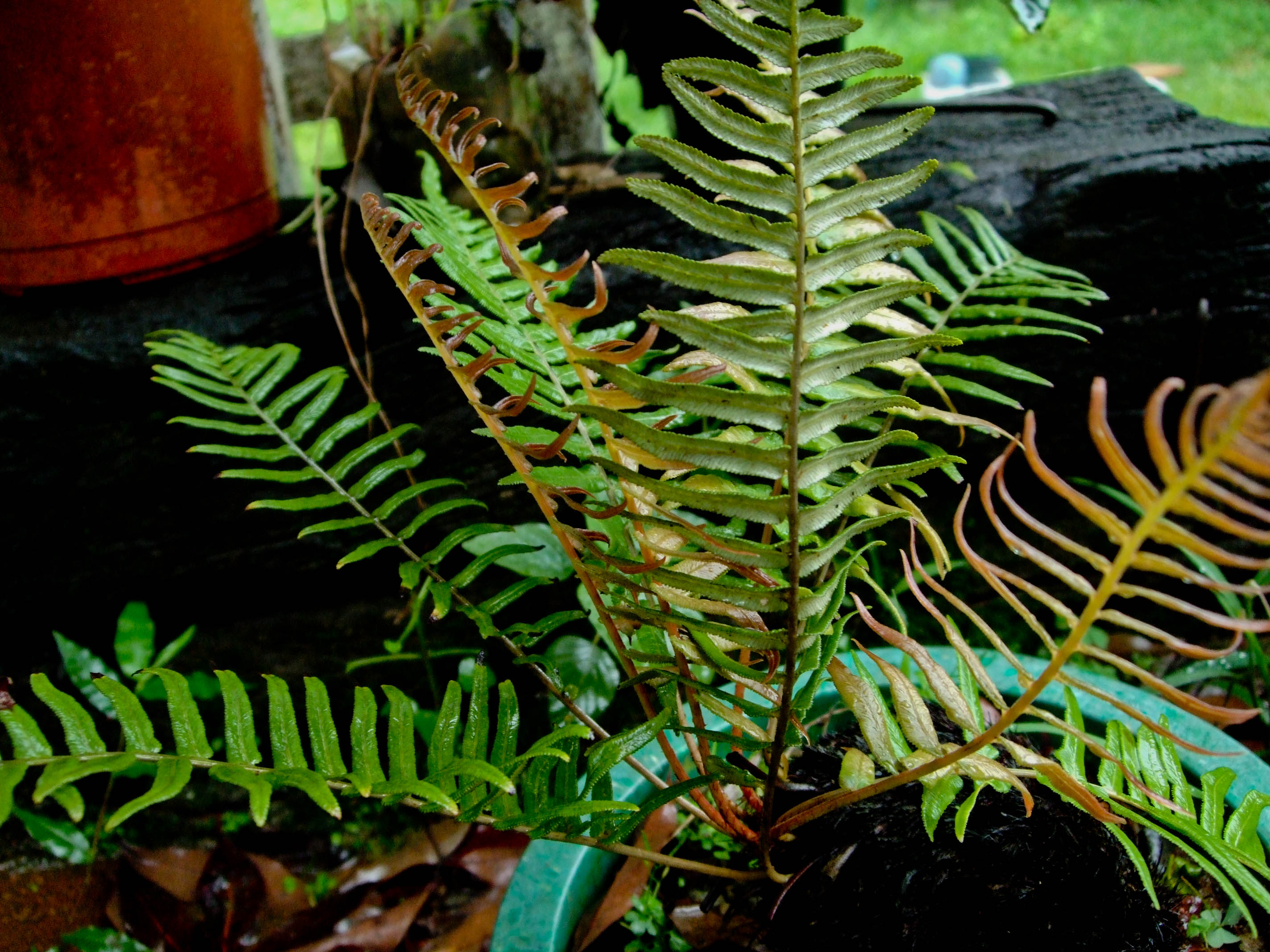

Scientific classification
- Kingdom: Plantae
- Clade: Tracheophytes
- Division: Polypodiophyta
- Class: Polypodiopsida
- Order: Polypodiales
- Suborder: Aspleniineae
- Family: Blechnaceae
- Genus: Brainea; J.Sm.
- Species: B. insignis

Binomial name
- Brainea insignis (Hook.) J.Sm.

= Brainea =

Genus of ferns

Brainea is a genus of ferns in the family Blechnaceae, subfamily Blechnoideae, with a single species Brainea insignis, according to the Pteridophyte Phylogeny Group classification of 2016 (PPG I). The genus is accepted in a 2016 classification of the family Blechnaceae, but other sources sink it into a very broadly defined Blechnum, equivalent to the whole of the PPG I subfamily.
