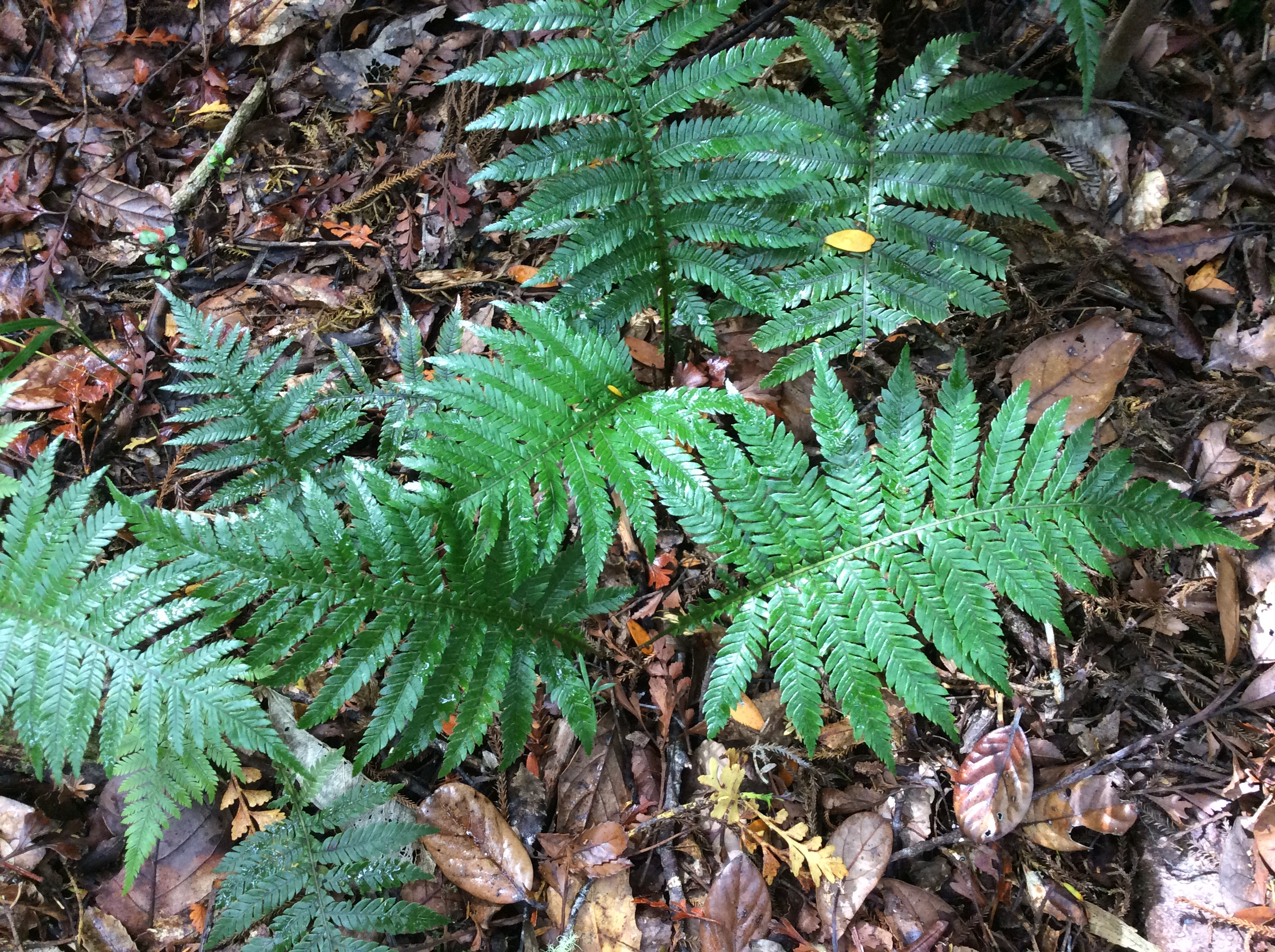
- Diploblechnum fraseri

Scientific classification
- Kingdom: Plantae
- Clade: Tracheophytes
- Division: Polypodiophyta
- Class: Polypodiopsida
- Order: Polypodiales
- Suborder: Aspleniineae
- Family: Blechnaceae
- Subfamily: Blechnoideae
- Genus: Diploblechnum; Hayata

Species
- See text.

= Diploblechnum =

Genus of ferns

Diploblechnum is a genus of ferns in the family Blechnaceae, subfamily Blechnoideae, according to the Pteridophyte Phylogeny Group classification of 2016 (PPG I). The genus is accepted in a 2016 classification of the family Blechnaceae, but other sources sink it into a very broadly defined Blechnum, equivalent to the whole of the PPG I subfamily.

== Species ==
As of July 2025, using the PPG I classification system, the Checklist of Ferns and Lycophytes of the World accepted the following six species:

- Diploblechnum acuminatum (C.T.White & Goy) Gasper & V.A.O.Dittrich
- Diploblechnum diversifolium (Mett.) Gasper & V.A.O.Dittrich
- Diploblechnum fraseri (A.Cunn.) De Vol
- Diploblechnum lenormandii (Baker) Gasper & V.A.O.Dittrich
- Diploblechnum neglectum (F.M.Bailey) Gasper & V.A.O.Dittrich
- Diploblechnum rosenstockii (Copel.) Gasper & V.A.O.Dittrich
