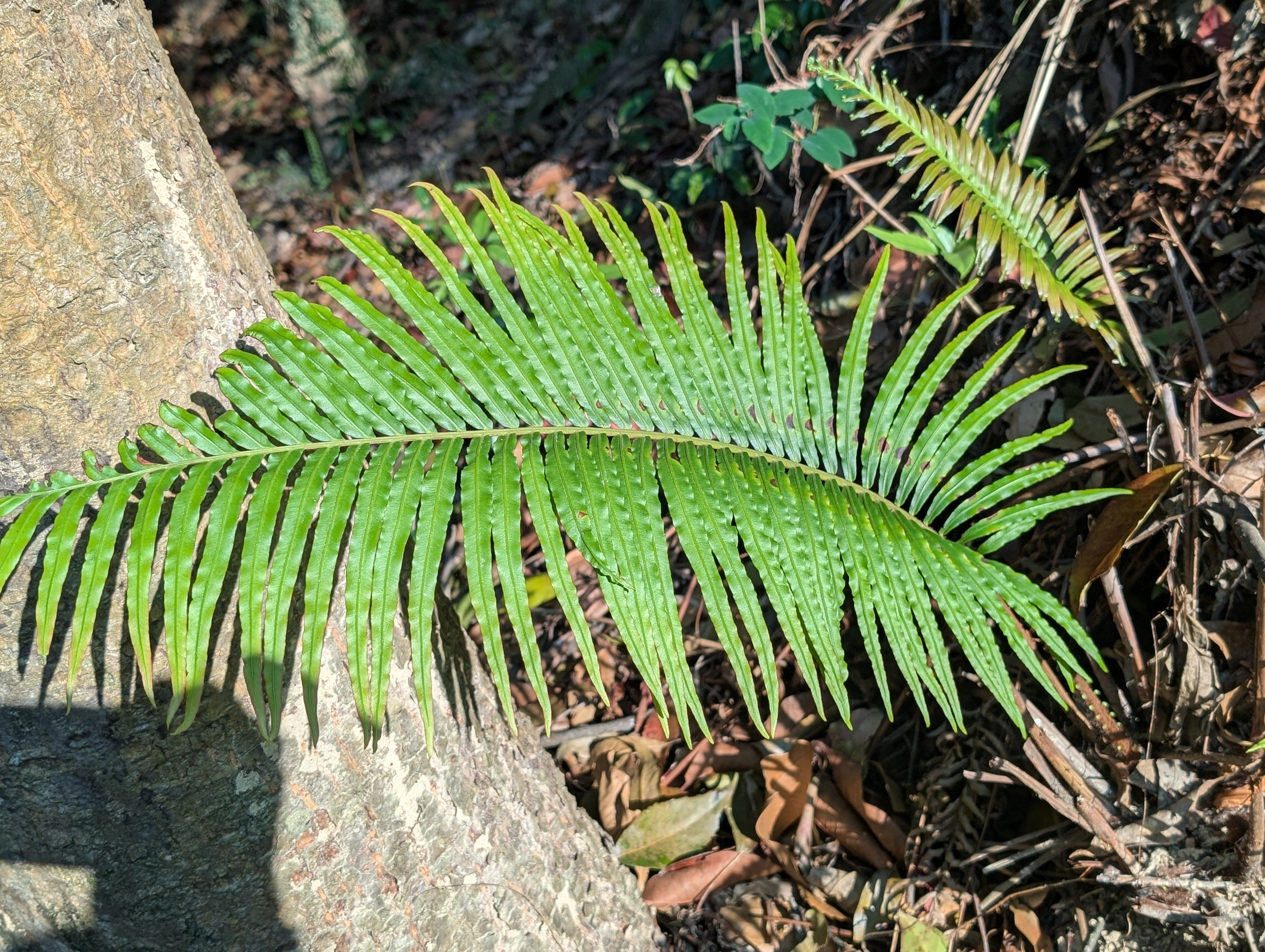
- Growing in Guangdong Province, China

Scientific classification
- Kingdom: Plantae
- Clade: Embryophytes
- Clade: Tracheophytes
- Division: Polypodiophyta
- Class: Polypodiopsida
- Order: Polypodiales
- Suborder: Aspleniineae
- Family: Blechnaceae
- Genus: Blechnopsis
- Species: B. orientalis

Binomial name
- Blechnopsis orientalis (L.) C.Presl

Synonyms
- Blechnum orientale L.

= Blechnopsis orientalis =

Species of fern

Blechnopsis orientalis is a species of fern. Found growing naturally in many parts of the world, such as India, China, South-east Asia to northern Australia. The often published name Blechnum orientale is now considered by many authorities as a synonym of Blechnopsis orientalis.
