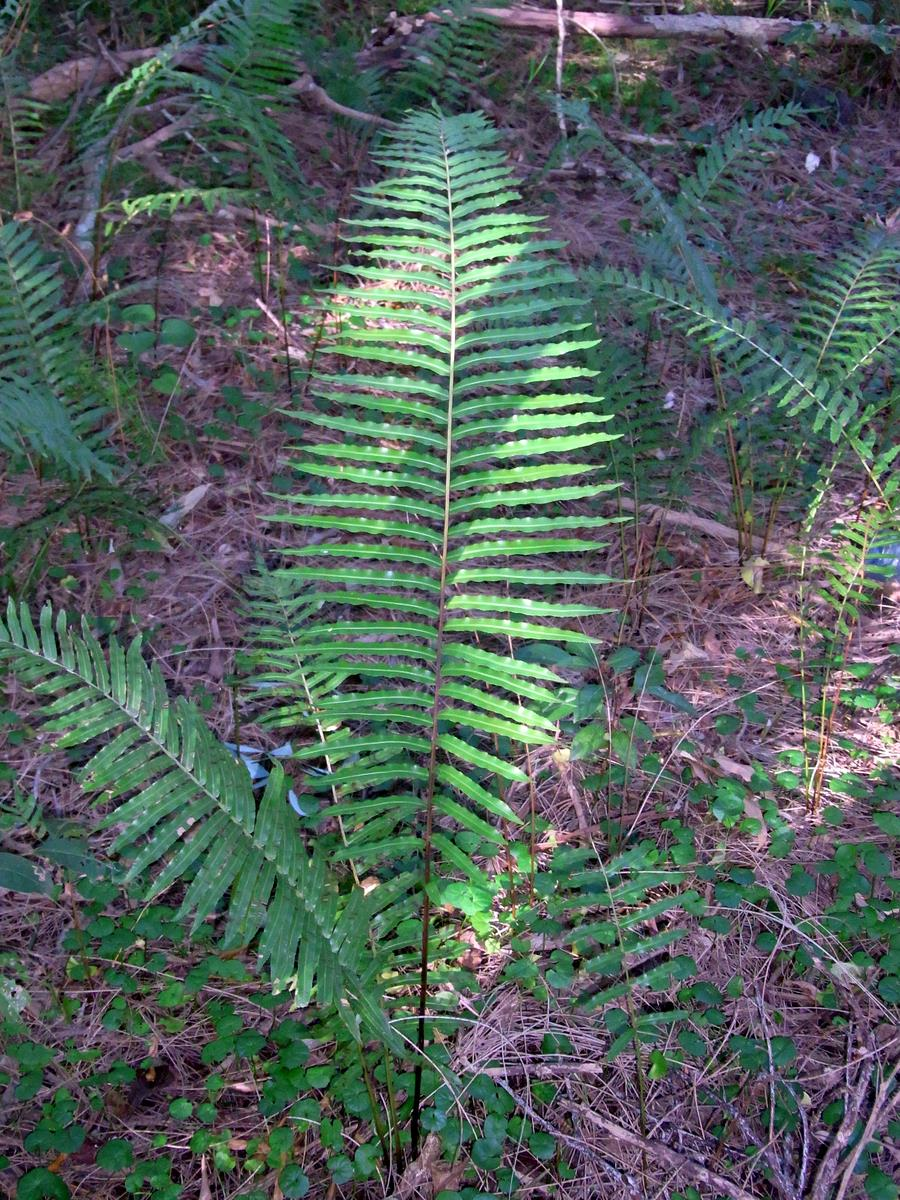
- Telmatoblechnum indicum

Scientific classification
- Kingdom: Plantae
- Clade: Tracheophytes
- Division: Polypodiophyta
- Class: Polypodiopsida
- Order: Polypodiales
- Suborder: Aspleniineae
- Family: Blechnaceae
- Subfamily: Stenochlaenoideae
- Genus: Telmatoblechnum; Perrie, D.J.Ohlsen & Brownsey

Species
- See text.

Synonyms
- Blechnopsis sect. Diafnia C.Presl

= Telmatoblechnum =

Genus of ferns

Telmatoblechnum is a genus of ferns in the family Blechnaceae, subfamily Stenochlaenoideae.

== Species ==
As of January 2020, the Checklist of Ferns and Lycophytes of the World and Plants of the World Online accepted two species:

- Telmatoblechnum indicum (Burm.f.) Perrie, D.J.Ohlsen & Brownsey
- Telmatoblechnum serrulatum (Rich.) Perrie, D.J.Ohlsen & Brownsey
