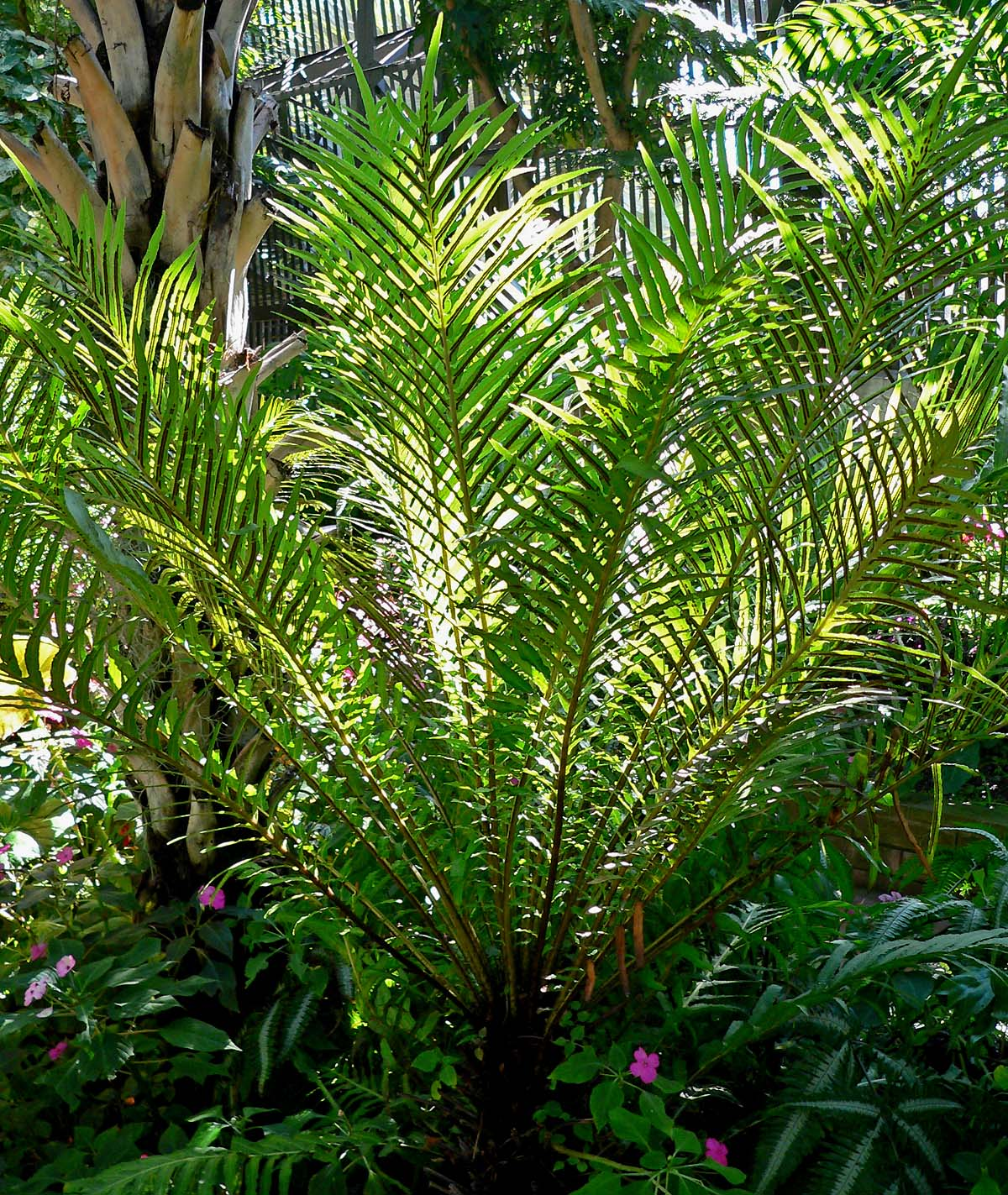
- Oceaniopteris ciliata in cultivation

Scientific classification
- Kingdom: Plantae
- Clade: Embryophytes
- Clade: Tracheophytes
- Division: Polypodiophyta
- Class: Polypodiopsida
- Order: Polypodiales
- Suborder: Aspleniineae
- Family: Blechnaceae
- Subfamily: Blechnoideae
- Genus: Oceaniopteris; Gasper & Salino

Species
- See text.

= Oceaniopteris =

Genus of ferns

Oceaniopteris is a genus of ferns in the family Blechnaceae, subfamily Blechnoideae, according to the Pteridophyte Phylogeny Group classification of 2016 (PPG I). The genus is accepted in a 2016 classification of the family Blechnaceae, but other sources sink it into a very broadly defined Blechnum, equivalent to the whole of the PPG I subfamily.

== Species ==
As of July 2026, using the PPG I classification system, the Checklist of Ferns and Lycophytes of the World accepted the following eight species:

- Oceaniopteris cartilaginea (Sw.) Gasper & Salino
- Oceaniopteris ciliata (T.Moore) Gasper & Salino
- Oceaniopteris egregia (Copel.) Gasper & Salino
- Oceaniopteris francii (Rosenst.) Gasper & Salino
- Oceaniopteris gibba (Labill.) Gasper & Salino
- Oceaniopteris obtusata (Labill.) Gasper & Salino
- Oceaniopteris vittata (Brack.) Gasper & Salino
- Oceaniopteris whelanii (F.M.Bailey) Gasper & Salino
