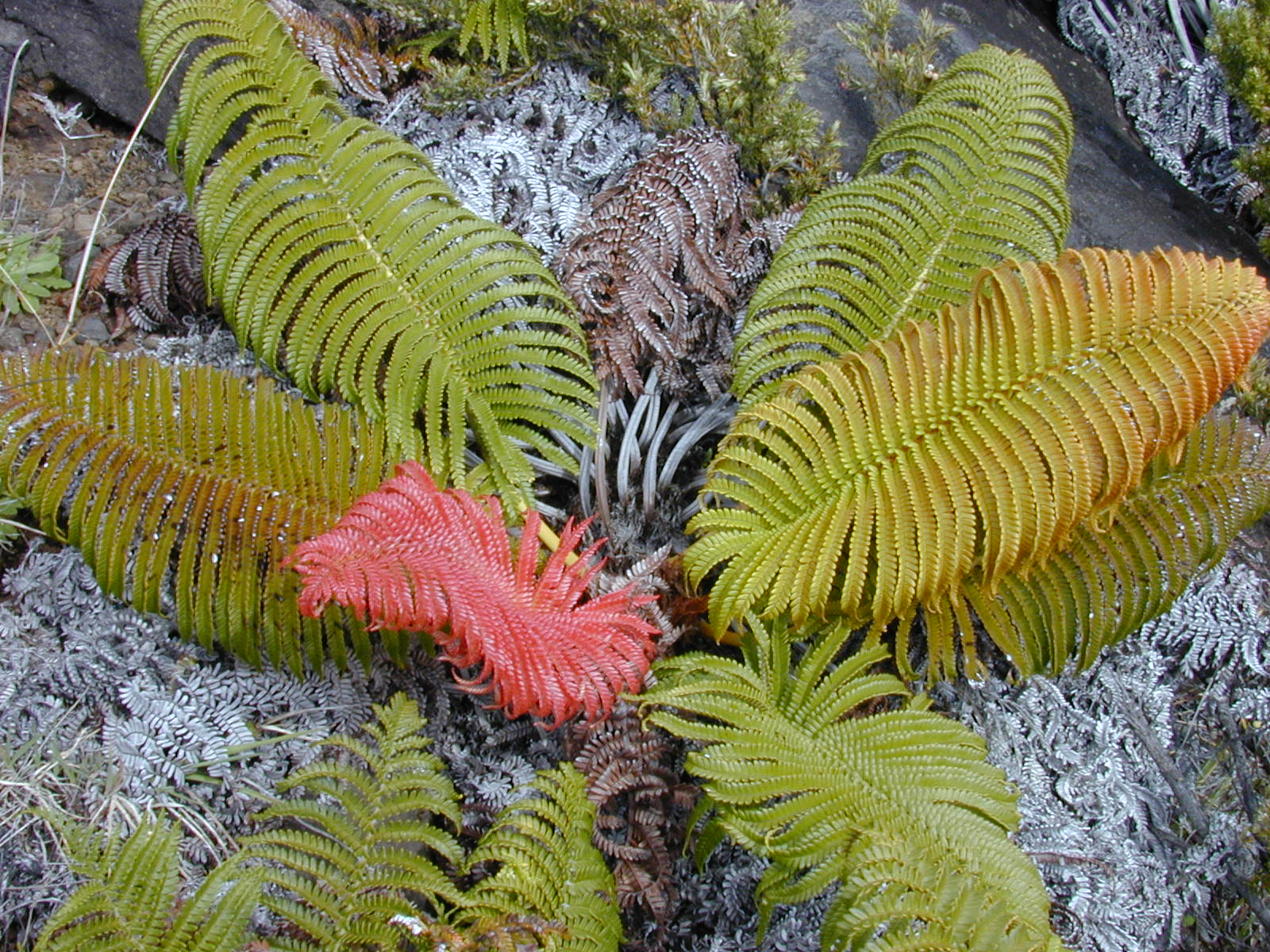
- Sadleria cyatheoides

Scientific classification
- Kingdom: Plantae
- Clade: Tracheophytes
- Division: Polypodiophyta
- Class: Polypodiopsida
- Order: Polypodiales
- Suborder: Aspleniineae
- Family: Blechnaceae
- Subfamily: Blechnoideae
- Genus: Sadleria; Kaulf.

Species
- See text

= Sadleria =

Genus of plants

Sadleria is a genus of six species of ferns in the family Blechnaceae, all endemic to Hawaii.

== Taxonomy ==
Georg Friedrich Kaulfuss distinguished the genus in 1824 based on samples of S. cyatheoides acquired by Adelbert von Chamisso in 1821. Chamisso had been serving as the naturalist for a Russian scientific expedition led by Otto von Kotzebue aboard the vessel Rurick. Kaulfuss named the genus after Joseph Sadler (1791–1849), a Hungarian naturalist who studied European ferns.

=== Species ===
As of July 2025, the Checklist of Ferns and Lycophytes of the World accepted the following six species:

- Sadleria cyatheoides Kaulf. (amaumau fern or rasp fern)
- Sadleria pallida Hook. & Arn.
- Sadleria souleyetiana (Gaudich.) Moore
- Sadleria squarrosa (Gaudich.) T.Moore
- Sadleria unisora (Baker) Rob.
- Sadleria wagneriana D.D.Palmer & Flynn

The Halemaʻumaʻu crater on Kīlauea is named after S. cyatheoides.
