= Chain fern =

Chain fern is a common name for several ferns and may refer to:

- Woodwardia, a fern genus of the Northern Hemisphere
- Tmesipteris, a fern genus of the South Pacific, also called "hanging fork fern"
