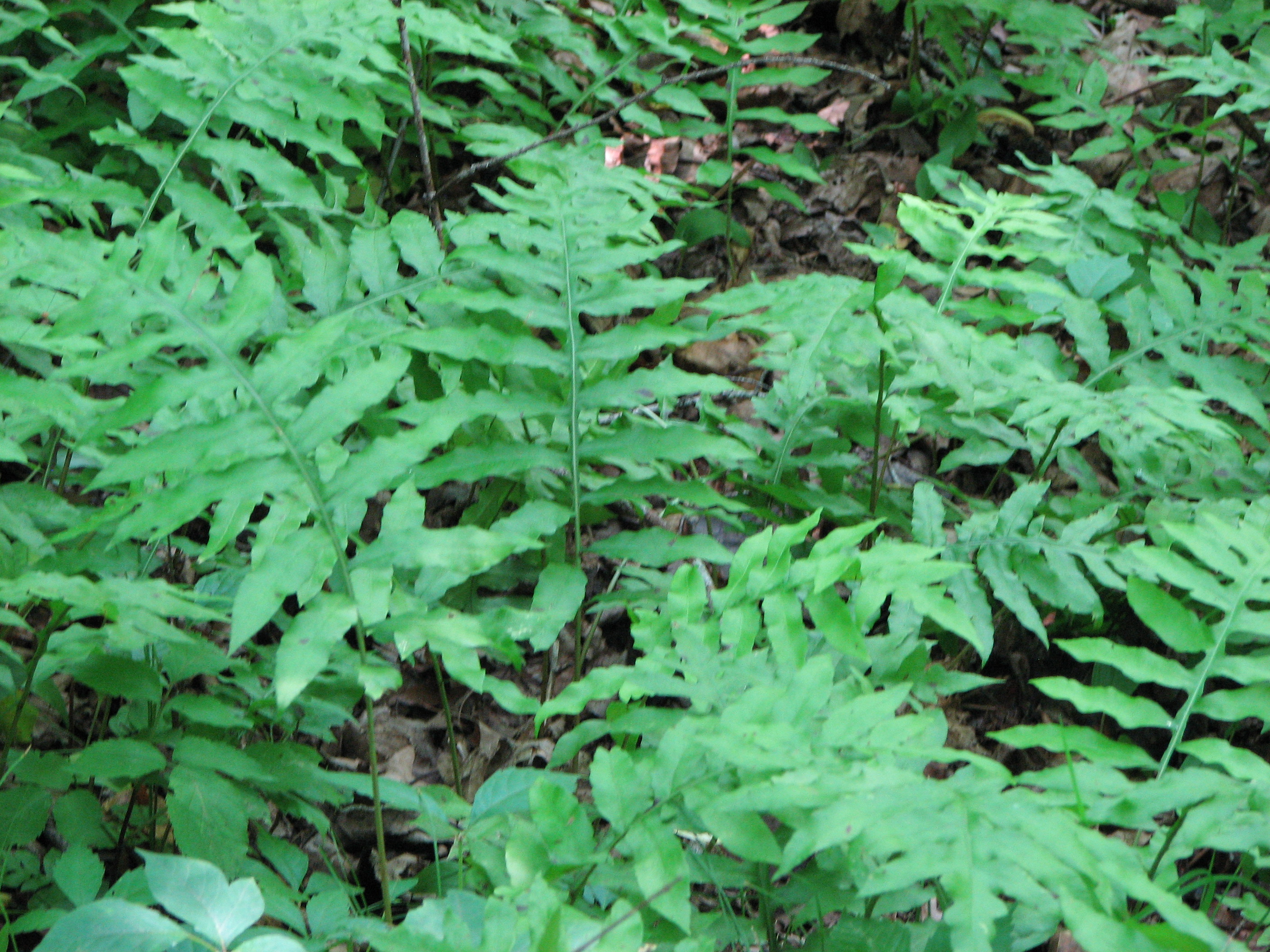
- Fronds

Conservation status
- Secure (NatureServe)

Scientific classification
- Kingdom: Plantae
- Clade: Tracheophytes
- Division: Polypodiophyta
- Class: Polypodiopsida
- Order: Polypodiales
- Suborder: Aspleniineae
- Family: Blechnaceae
- Genus: Lorinseria; C.Presl
- Species: L. areolata

Binomial name
- Lorinseria areolata (L.) C.Presl
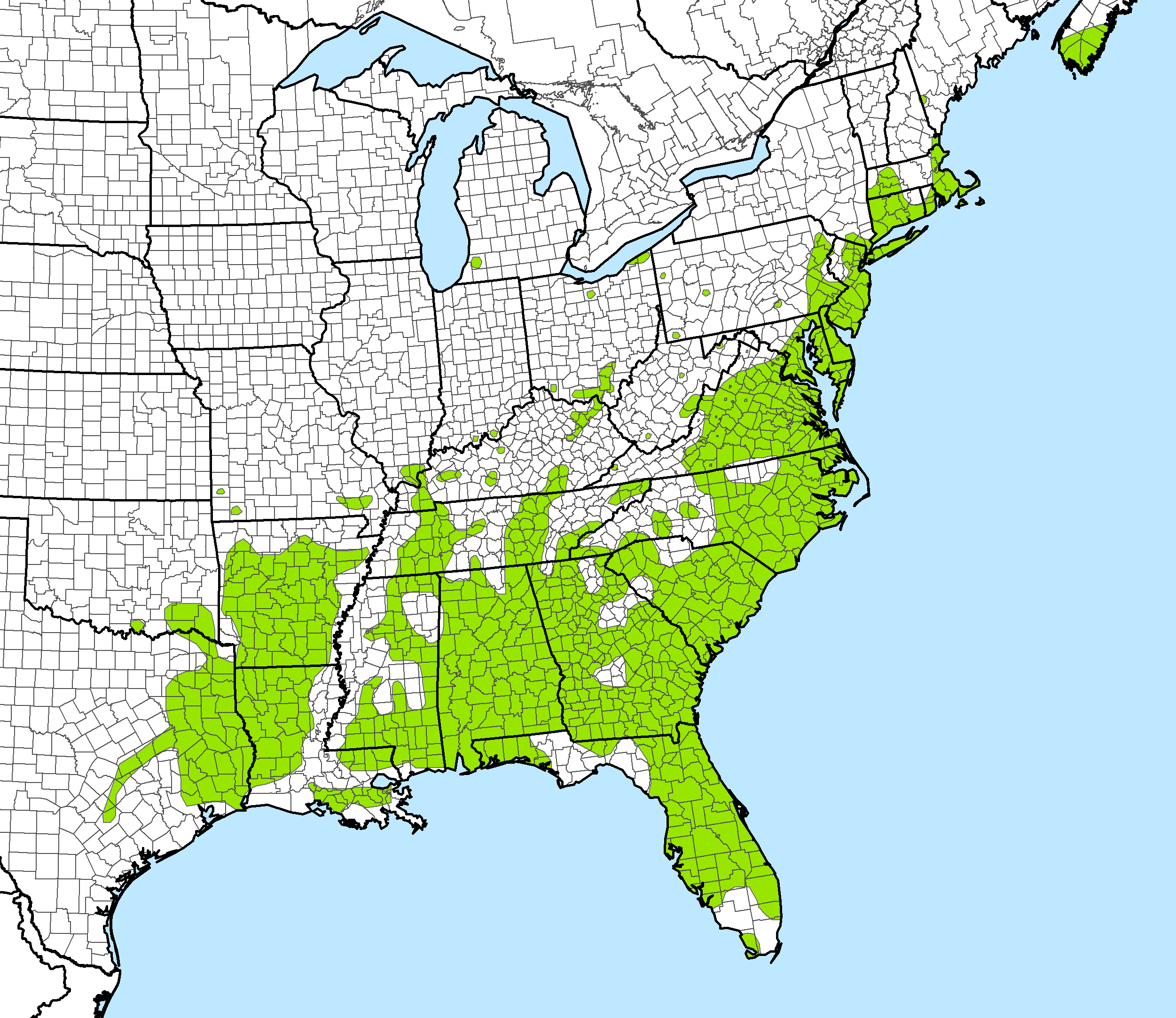

Synonyms
- Acrostichum areolatum L.; Woodwardia areolata (L.) T. Moore

= Lorinseria =

Genus of ferns

Lorinseria is a genus of fern in the subfamily Woodwardioideae of the family Blechnaceae. Its only species is Lorinseria areolata (synonym Woodwardia areolata), the netted chain fern or dwarf chain fern, native to eastern North America. The monotypic genus Lorinseria has been separated from Woodwardia in the Pteridophyte Phylogeny Group classification of 2016 (PPG I), on the basis of its anastamosing veins and lobed frond form, as well as its more marked frond dimorphism. However, the genus name Lorinseria appears to be a later homonym of Lorinsera Opiz, and will need to be replaced or conserved.

The sterile fronds are 40–60 cm long, and the fertile fronds 50–70 cm long.

It is superficially similar to Onoclea sensibilis and sometimes confused with it.

== Distribution and habitat ==
This species is native to the eastern United States, with a range spanning from Texas to Florida in the southeast and north to Massachusetts. A disjunct population also exists in southwestern Nova Scotia in Canada. It favors moist, sandy, acid soils, and has appeared in areas in the interior of the US around acid mine seeps, thus being one of the few species to benefit from acid mine drainage.

== Conservation ==
Habitat loss and degradation harm the netted chain fern. This species is presumed to be extirpated from Michigan and may be extirpated from Maine according to NatureServe.
