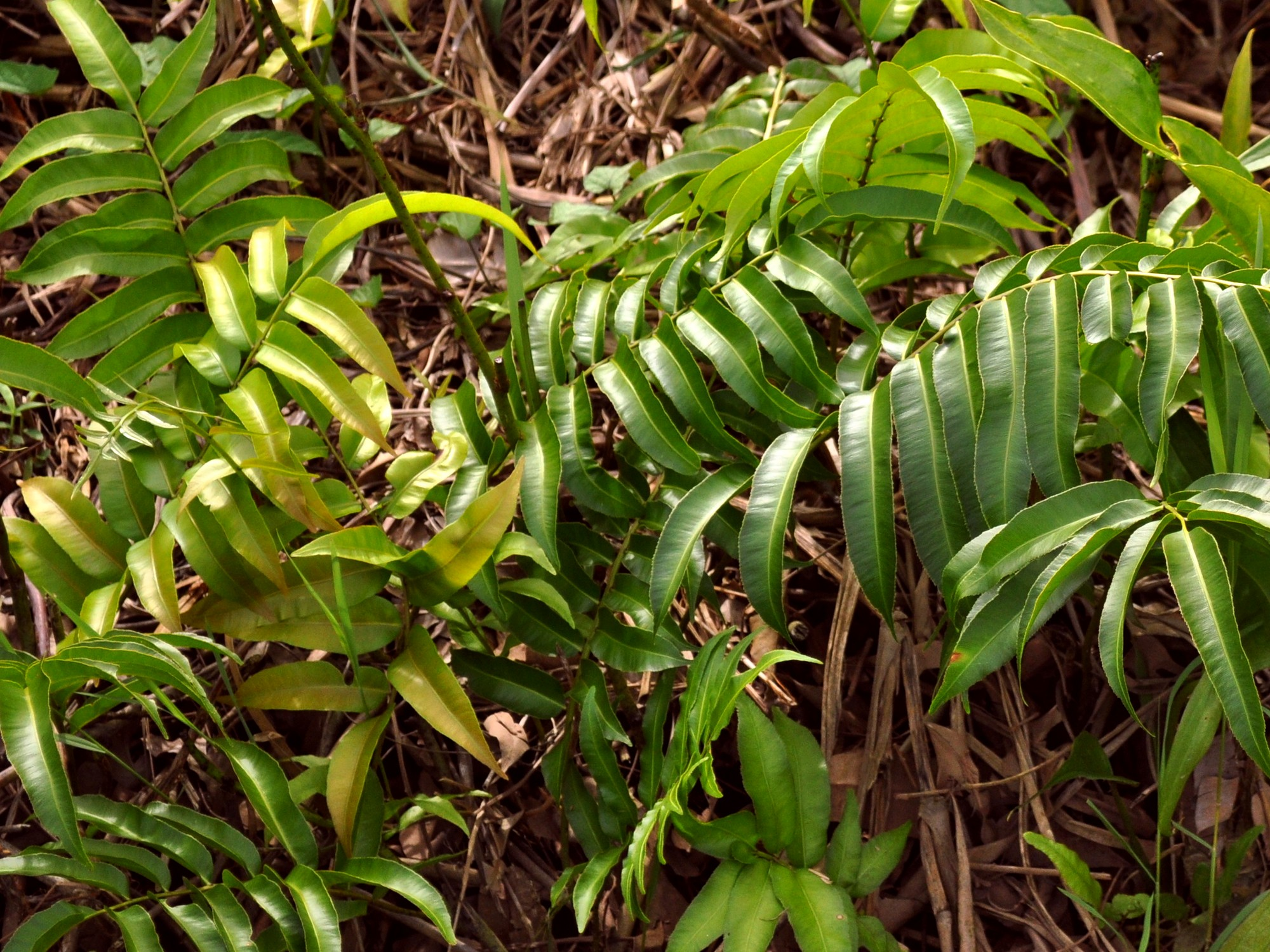
- Stenochlaena palustris in West Kalimantan, Indonesia

Scientific classification
- Kingdom: Plantae
- Clade: Tracheophytes
- Division: Polypodiophyta
- Class: Polypodiopsida
- Order: Polypodiales
- Suborder: Aspleniineae
- Family: Blechnaceae
- Subfamily: Stenochlaenoideae
- Genus: Stenochlaena; J.Sm.

= Stenochlaena =

Genus of ferns

Stenochlaena is a genus of ferns of the plant family Blechnaceae. Six species were formally accepted in an April 2013 scientific review of the genus, first written some years earlier and submitted in 2009. One additional species S. hainanensis awaits confirmation of its difference from S. palustris by means of differences in fertile material and/or its formal publication. One additional likely species grows naturally in Cameroon, Africa, recognised with the descriptive name Stenochlaena sp. 'Cameroon' but it awaits formal description.

Some species of Stenochlaena are common climbing ferns in South-East Asian rainforests.

== Species ==
The following list includes all species in this genus that are accepted by Plants of the World Online as of 16 January 2024.

- Stenochlaena areolaris (Harr.) Copel. - Philippines, New Guinea
- Stenochlaena cumingii Holttum - Philippines, New Guinea
- Stenochlaena milnei Underw. - Philippines, Maluku, New Guinea, Bismarck Archipelago, Solomon Is.
- Stenochlaena palustris (Burm.f.) Bedd. - Tropical & subtropical Asia to W. Pacific
- Stenochlaena riauensis Sofiyanti, Iriani, Fitmawati & A.A.Roza - Sumatra
- Stenochlaena tenuifolia (Desv.) T.Moore - Cameroon to Kenya and S. Africa, Comoros, Madagascar
