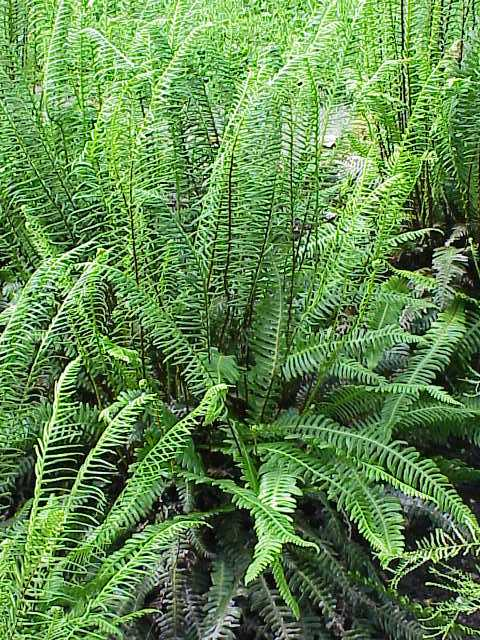
- Struthiopteris spicant

Scientific classification
- Kingdom: Plantae
- Clade: Tracheophytes
- Division: Polypodiophyta
- Class: Polypodiopsida
- Order: Polypodiales
- Suborder: Aspleniineae
- Family: Blechnaceae; Newman

Type genus
- Blechnum

Subfamilies and genera
- See text

Synonyms
- Stenochlaenaceae Ching 1978

= Blechnaceae =

Blechnaceae Temporal range: Tithonian –Recent

Family of ferns

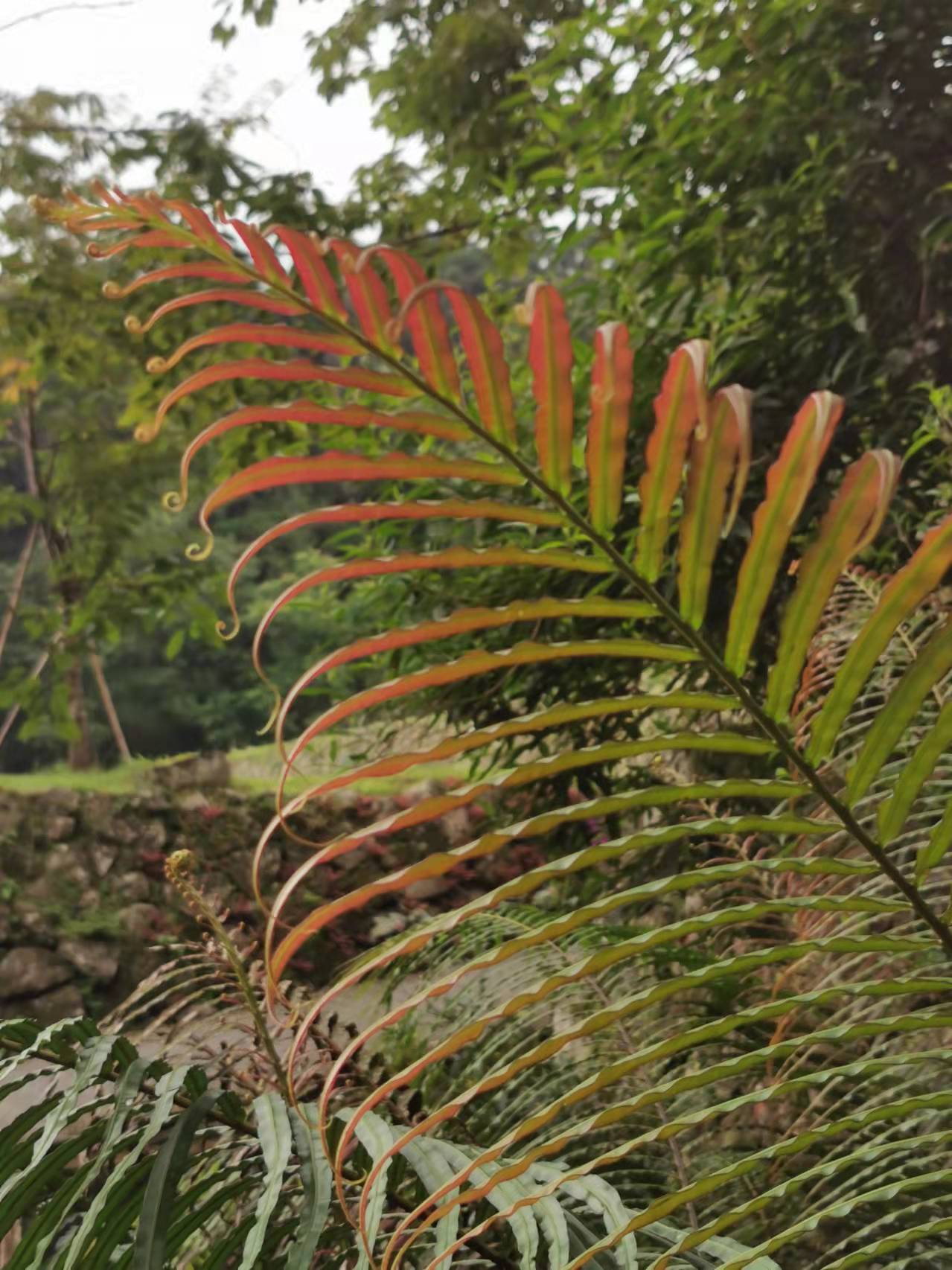
Blechnopsis orientalis. The young opening fronds of many species are usually tinged with red.

Blechnaceae is a family of ferns in the order Polypodiales, with a cosmopolitan distribution. Its status as a family and the number of genera included have both varied considerably. In the Pteridophyte Phylogeny Group classification of 2016 (PPG I), the family has 24 genera, and excludes genera placed in the separate family Onocleaceae. The family is divided into three subfamilies, including Blechnoideae s.s. Alternatively, the entire family may be treated as the subfamily Blechnoideae s.l. of a very broadly defined family Aspleniaceae, and include genera others place in Onocleaceae.

== Description ==
Most are ground dwelling, some are climbers, such as Stenochlaena. A characteristic feature of many species is that the young opening fronds are usually tinged with red.

== Taxonomy ==
The family was created by Newman in 1844. In 2014, Christenhusz and Chase submerged it as subfamily Blechnoideae within the family Aspleniaceae and included Onocleaceae in it. The PPG I classification of 2016 restored it to family status.

Blechnaceae is a member of the eupolypods II clade (now the suborder Aspleniineae), in the order Polypodiales. It is related to other families in the clade as in the following cladogram:

- Aspleniineae (eupolypods II)
  - Cystopteridaceae
  - - - Rhachidosoraceae
      - - Diplaziopsidaceae
        - - Aspleniaceae
          - Hemidictyaceae
    - - Thelypteridaceae
      - - Woodsiaceae
        - - - Onocleaceae
            - Blechnaceae
          - Athyriaceae

=== Subdivisions ===
The number of genera accepted within Blechnaceae (or Blechnoideae when treated as a subfamily) has varied between authors. Christenhusz and Chase (2014), treating the group as a subfamily, describe the situation as follows: "Blechnoideae comprise three major clades, one corresponding to Onoclea sensu lato, a second corresponding to Woodwardia, sister to all other species that can be treated as the single genus Blechnum. However, the subclade sister to the rest of Blechnum sensu lato contains the vining taxa Stenochlaena, Salpichlaena J.Sm. and a few non-vining Blechnum species with long-creeping rhizomes, which may have to be accepted at the generic level pending further studies. Brainea, Doodia, Pteridoblechnum and Sadleria belong to Blechnum sensu lato."

Perrie et al. (2014) retained the family rank and excluded Onoclea as a separate family, Onocleaceae, sister to Blechnaceae. They identified three major clades within the remaining Blechnaceae, which they labelled Woodwardia, super-Stenochlaena and super-Blechnum, with the latter two as sister groups. They did not consider Blechnum as monophyletic and recommended revision of intergeneric boundaries, resulting in seven genera.

Gasper et al. (2016), independently of Christenhusz and Chase, examined the deeper relationships of the Blechnaceae, retaining its family status and excluding Onocleaceae, and allocated the three major clades of Perrie et al. (2014) to subfamilies: Woodwardioideae, Stenochlaenoideae and Blechnoideae. Their approach to the polyphyletic nature of Blechnum was to create a series of monophyletic segregate genera, resulting in 24 genera in total. The relationship between the three subfamilies was found to be as follows:

- Blechnaceae
  - Woodwardioideae
  - - Stenochlaenoideae
    - Blechnoideae

The approximate relationship between some of the taxa used in the classifications of Christenhusz and Chase (2014) and PPG I (2016) is shown in the table below.

Approximate relationships in two classifications
Christenhusz & Chase (2014)	PPG I (2016)
Family Aspleniaceae Subfamily Blechnoideae Genus Blechnum s.l.	Suborder Aspleniineae Family Blechnaceae Subfamily Blechnoideae (containing Blechnum s.s.)

=== Subfamilies and genera ===
Phylogeny of Blechnaceae

- - - Woodwardioideae
      - Lorinseria
      - - Anchistea
        - Woodwardia
  - - Stenochlaenoideae
      - Salpichlaena
      - - Stenochlaena
        - Telmatoblechnum
    - Blechnoideae
      - Brainea
      - - - Struthiopterideae
            - Spicantopsis
            - - Blechnidium
              - Struthiopteris
        - - - Sadlerieae
              - - Cleistoblechnum
                - Blechnopsis
              - Sadleria
          - - Lomaridium
            - - - Lomarieae
                  Lomaria
              - - Lomariocycas
                - - Blechneae
                    - Cranfillia
                    - - Icarus
                      - - Blechnum
                        - Austroblechnum
                  - Doodieae
                    - - Diploblechnum
                      - - - Neoblechnum
                          - - Doodia maxima
                            - Oceaniopteris
                        - - Oceaniopteris species-group 2
                          - Doodia
                    - Parablechnum

In 2016, the Pteridophyte Phylogeny Group followed Gasper et al. (2016) in accepting 24 genera, grouped into three subfamilies with approximately 265 species, most of which are placed in the subfamily Blechnoideae.

Subfamily Woodwardioideae Gasper, V.A.O.Dittrich & Salino

- Anchistea C.Presl
- Lorinseria C.Presl
- Woodwardia Sm.

Subfamily Stenochlaenoideae (Ching) J.P.Roux

- Salpichlaena J.Sm.
- Stenochlaena J.Sm.
- Telmatoblechnum Perrie, D.J.Ohlsen & Brownsey

Subfamily Blechnoideae Gasper, V.A.O.Dittrich & Salino

- Austroblechnum Gasper & V.A.O.Dittrich
- Blechnidium T.Moore
- Blechnopsis C.Presl
- Blechnum L.
- Brainea J.Sm.
- Cleistoblechnum Gasper & Salino
- Cranfillia Gasper & V.A.O.Dittrich
- Diploblechnum Hayata
- Doodia R.Br.
- Icarus Gasper & Salino
- Lomaria Willd.
- Lomaridium C.Presl
- Lomariocycas (J.Sm.) Gasper & A.R.Sm.
- Neoblechnum Gasper & V.A.O.Dittrich
- ×Oceanidoodia Liu, Schuettp. & H. Schneid.
- Oceaniopteris Gasper & Salino
- Parablechnum C.Presl
- Sadleria Kaulf.
- Struthiopteris Scop.

Subfamily incertae sedis

- †Trawetsia Smith et al Ypresian, Princeton Chert

== Bibliography ==
- Maarten J. M. Christenhusz; Xian-Chun Zhang & Harald Schneider (2011). "A linear sequence of extant families and genera of lycophytes and ferns" (PDF). Phytotaxa. 19: 7–54. Bibcode:2011Phytx..19....7C. doi:10.11646/phytotaxa.19.1.2.
- Christenhusz, Maarten J.M. & Chase, Mark W. (2014). "Trends and concepts in fern classification". Annals of Botany. 113 (9): 571–594. doi:10.1093/aob/mct299. PMC 3936591. PMID 24532607.
- Gasper, André L. de; Almeida, Thaís E.; Dittrich, Vinícius A. de O.; Smith, Alan R.; Salino, Alexandre (October 2016). "Molecular phylogeny of the fern family Blechnaceae (Polypodiales) with a revised genus-level treatment". Cladistics. 33 (4): 429–446. doi:10.1111/cla.12173. PMID 34715732. S2CID 88680078.
- Gasper, André Luís de; Dittrich, Vinícius Antonio de Oliveira; Smith, Alan Reid; Salino, Alexandre (21 September 2016). "A classification for Blechnaceae (Polypodiales: Polypodiopsida): New genera, resurrected names, and combinations". Phytotaxa. 275 (3): 191. Bibcode:2016Phytx.275..191G. doi:10.11646/phytotaxa.275.3.1.
- Perrie, Leon R.; Wilson, Ruby K.; Shepherd, Lara D.; Ohlsen, Daniel J.; Batty, Erin L.; Brownsey, Patrick J.; Bayly, Michael J. (28 August 2014). "Molecular phylogenetics and generic taxonomy of Blechnaceae ferns". Taxon. 63 (4): 745–758. Bibcode:2014Taxon..63..745P. doi:10.12705/634.13.
- Pteridophyte Phylogeny Group I (2016). "A community-derived classification for extant lycophytes and ferns". Journal of Systematics and Evolution. 54 (6): 563–603. Bibcode:2016JSyEv..54..563.. doi:10.1111/jse.12229. S2CID 39980610.
- Smith, Alan R.; Pryer, Kathleen M.; Schuettpelz, Eric; Korall, Petra; Schneider, Harald; Wolf, Paul G. (1 January 2006). "A Classification for Extant Ferns" (PDF). Taxon. 55 (3): 705–731. Bibcode:2006Taxon..55..705S. doi:10.2307/25065646. JSTOR 25065646.
