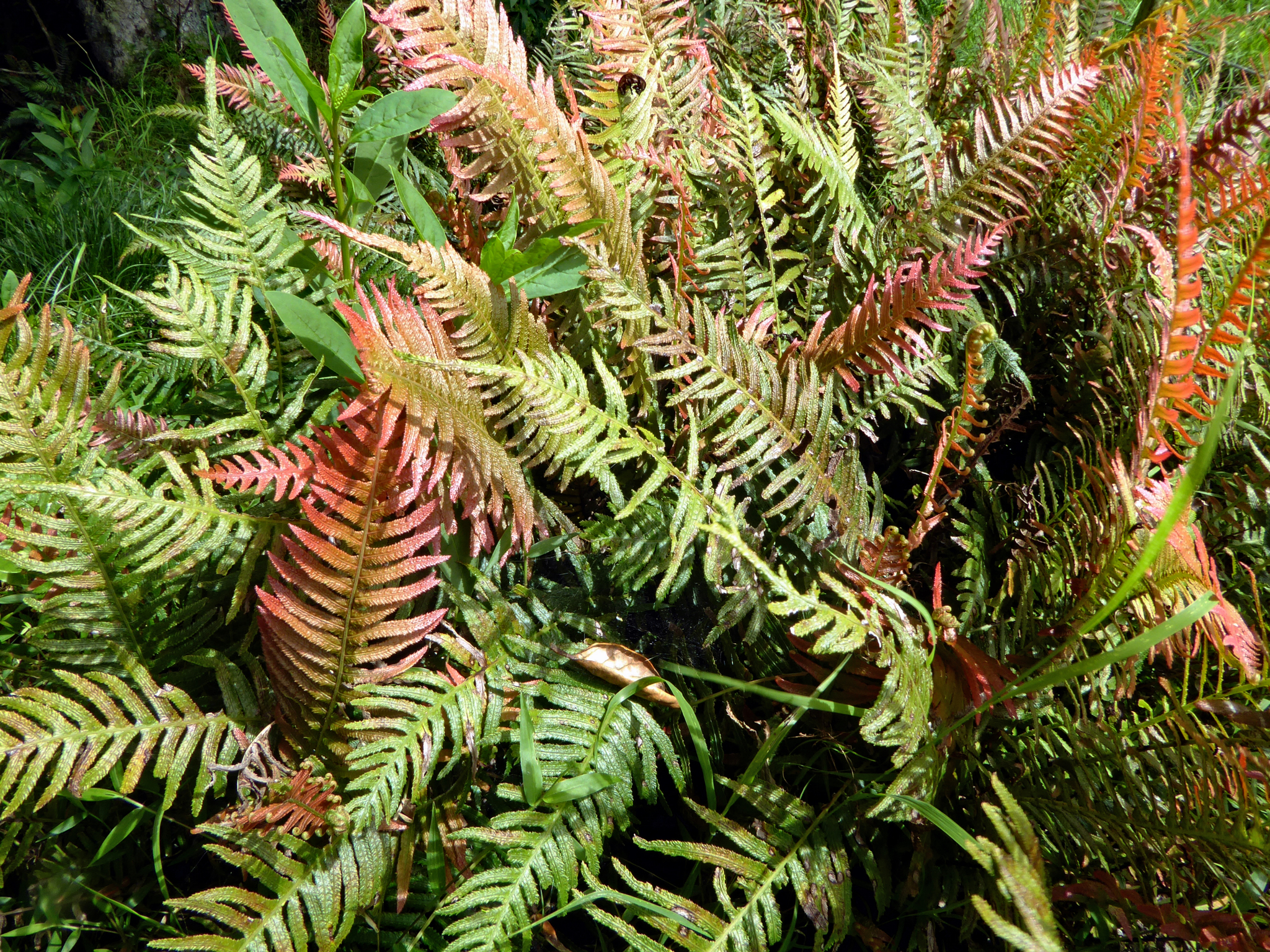
- Doodia australis in Duder Regional Park, Auckland

Scientific classification
- Kingdom: Plantae
- Clade: Tracheophytes
- Division: Polypodiophyta
- Class: Polypodiopsida
- Order: Polypodiales
- Suborder: Aspleniineae
- Family: Blechnaceae
- Genus: Doodia
- Species: D. australis

Binomial name
- Doodia australis (Parris) Parris

Synonyms
- Blechnum parrisiae Christenh.; Blechnum parrisii Christenh.; Doodia media subsp. australis Parris

= Doodia australis =

Species of fern

Doodia australis, known as the rasp fern, pukupuku, fragrant fern, or by its synonym Blechnum parrisiae, is a fern species native to New Zealand, and also present in Australia.

== Taxonomy ==
Doodia australis was first described as Doodia media subsp. australis by Barbara Sydney Parris in 1972. It was elevated to species status by Maarten J. M. Christenhusz, based on phylogenetic analysis.

Currently two scientific names are used for the species. Sources that use the broad circumscription, which places many species within the genus Blechnum, call the species Blechnum australis, while sources such as the Checklist of Ferns and Lycophytes of the World which use a narrow circumscription (splitting Blechnum into different genera) uses the name Doodia australis.

Based on phylogenetic analysis, the closest related species to Doodia australis are Doodia media populations found in New Caledonia, Doodia kunthiana found in Hawaii, and Doodia aspera, found in Australia, with Doodia media populations found in Australia more distantly related. Due to its wide range and variation, it is possible that some populations of Doodia australis may warrant description as distinct species or subspecies.

== Description ==
Doodia australis is a fern covered in dense black scales. It can be distinguished from other New Zealand members of Doodia due to the pinkish red colour of new fronds.

== Distribution and habitat ==
Doodia australis is found in New Zealand, on the North Island, Kermadec Islands, Manawatāwhi / Three Kings Islands, and the northern South Island, as well as on Australia, Norfolk Island and Lord Howe Island. The species prefers coastal or lowland sites, and can sometimes become a weed in urban environments.

== Gallery ==
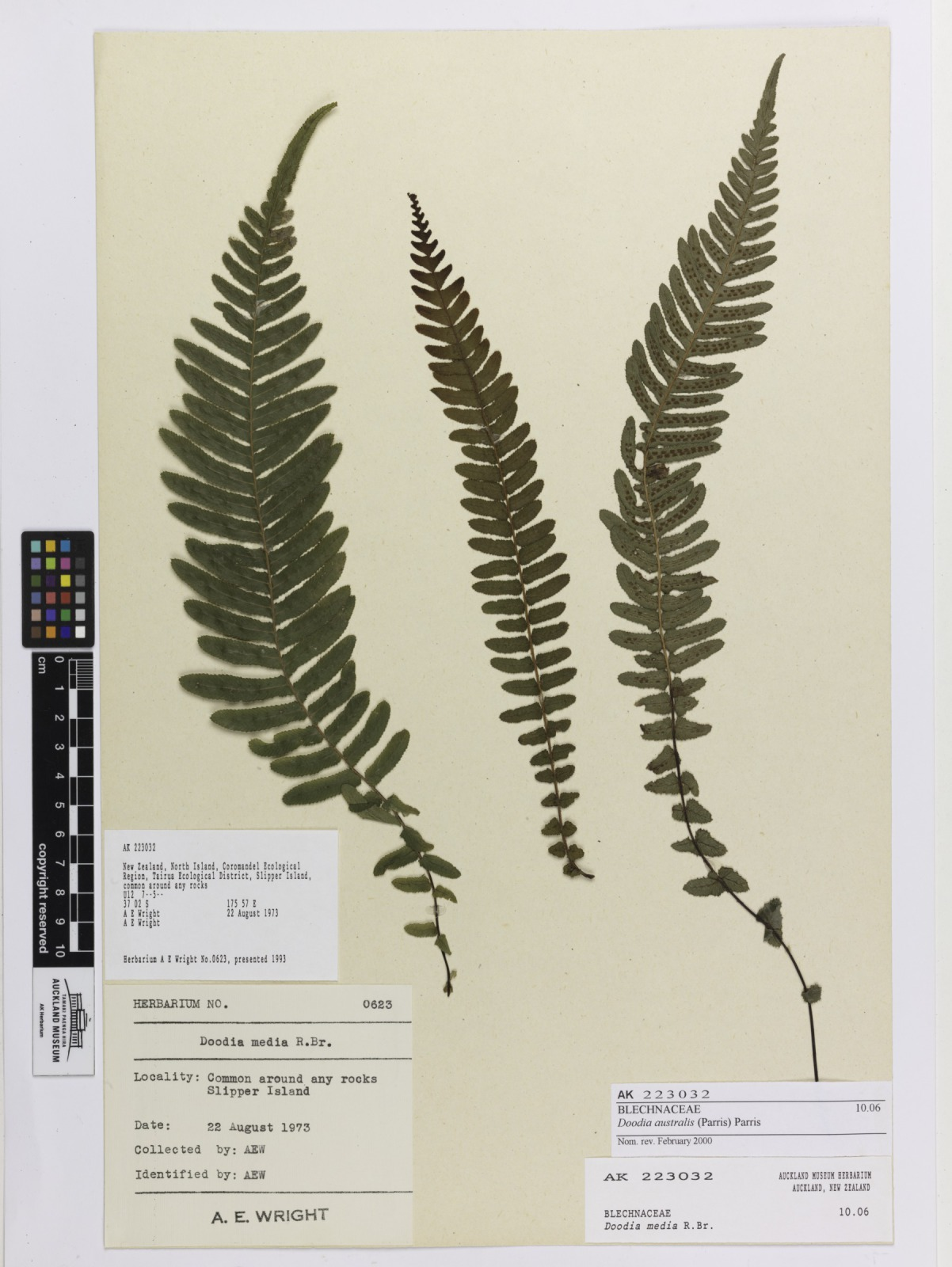
Herbarium specimen of Doodia australis

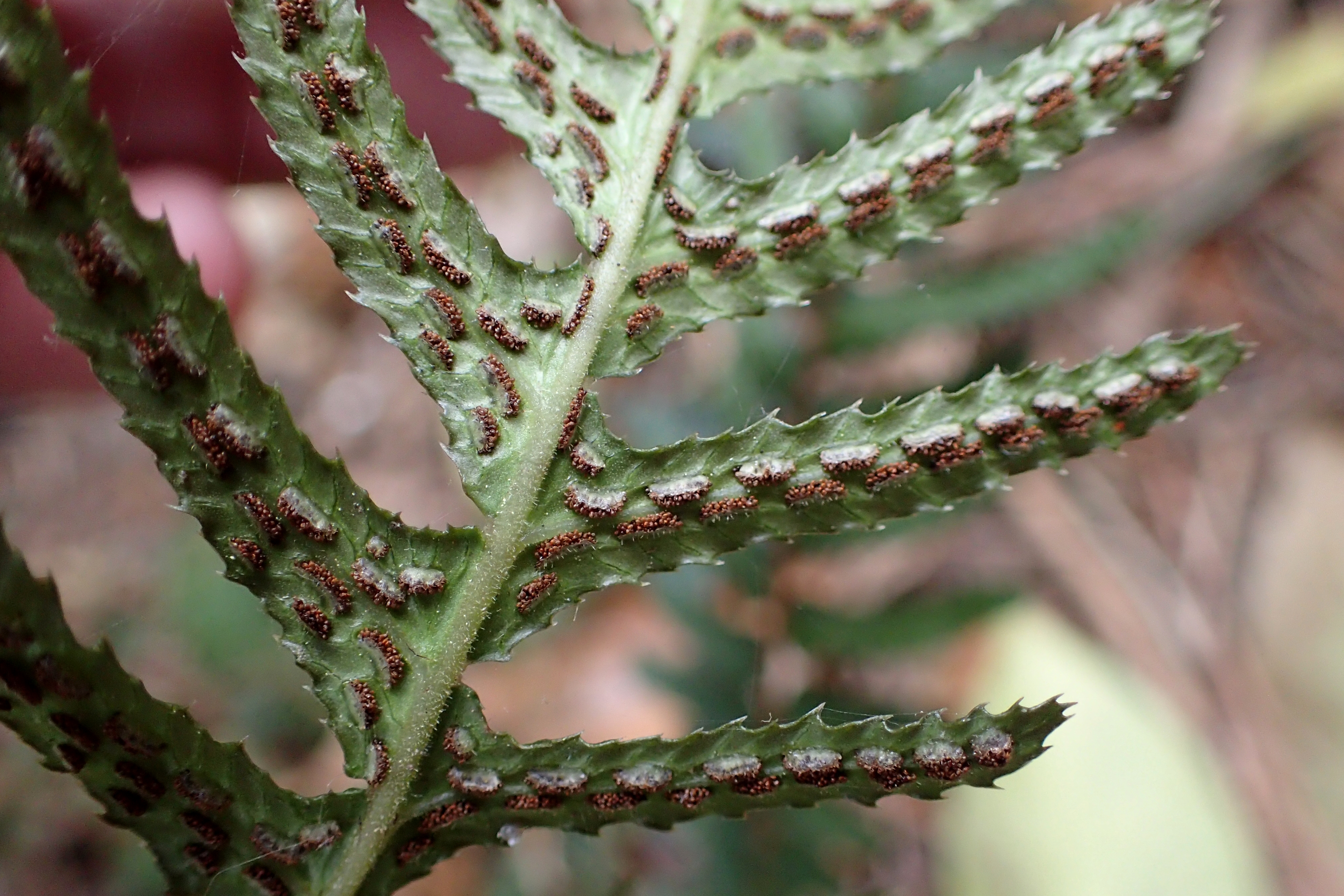
Underside of Doodia australis fronds

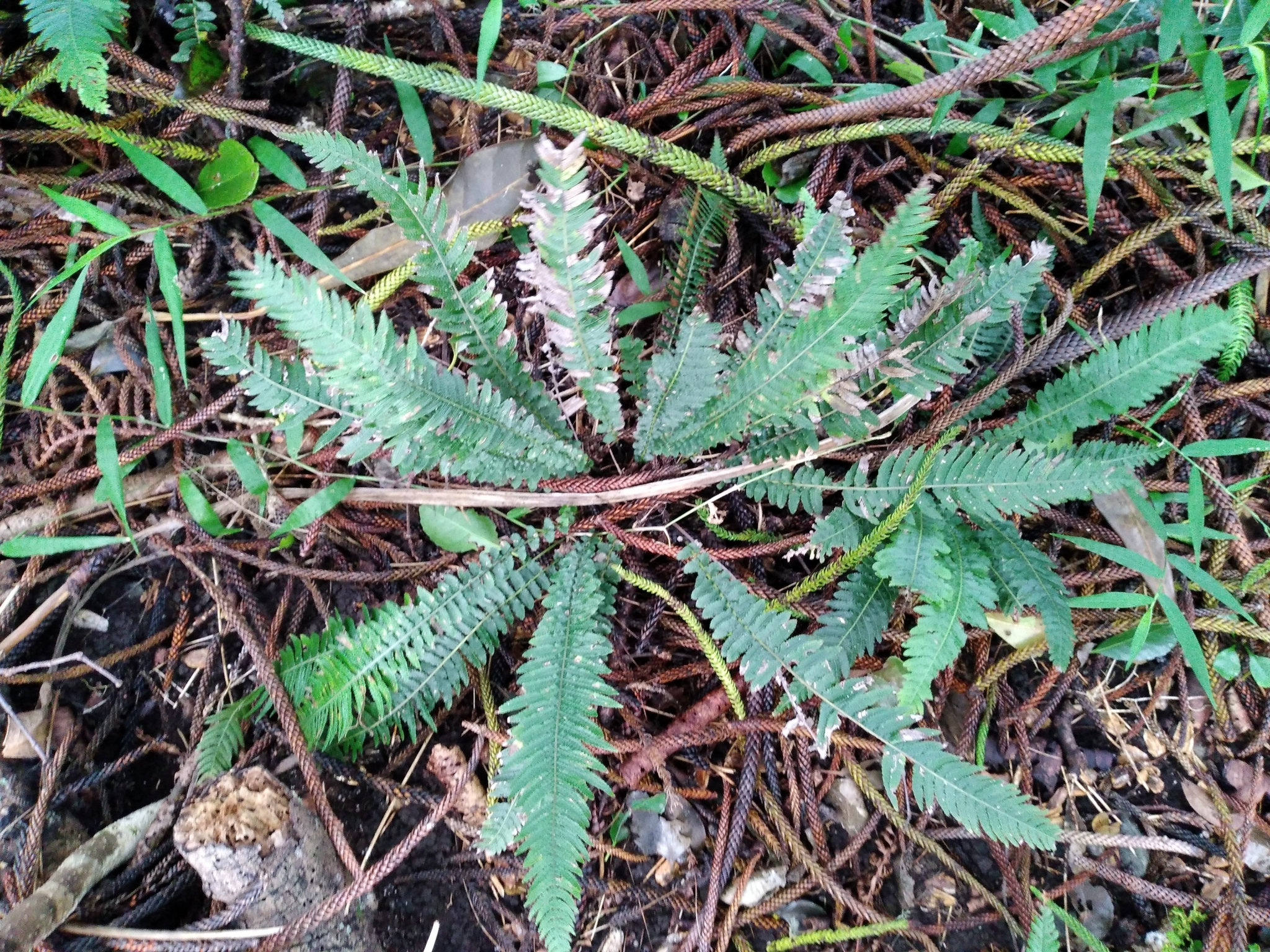
Doodia australis seen on Norfolk Island

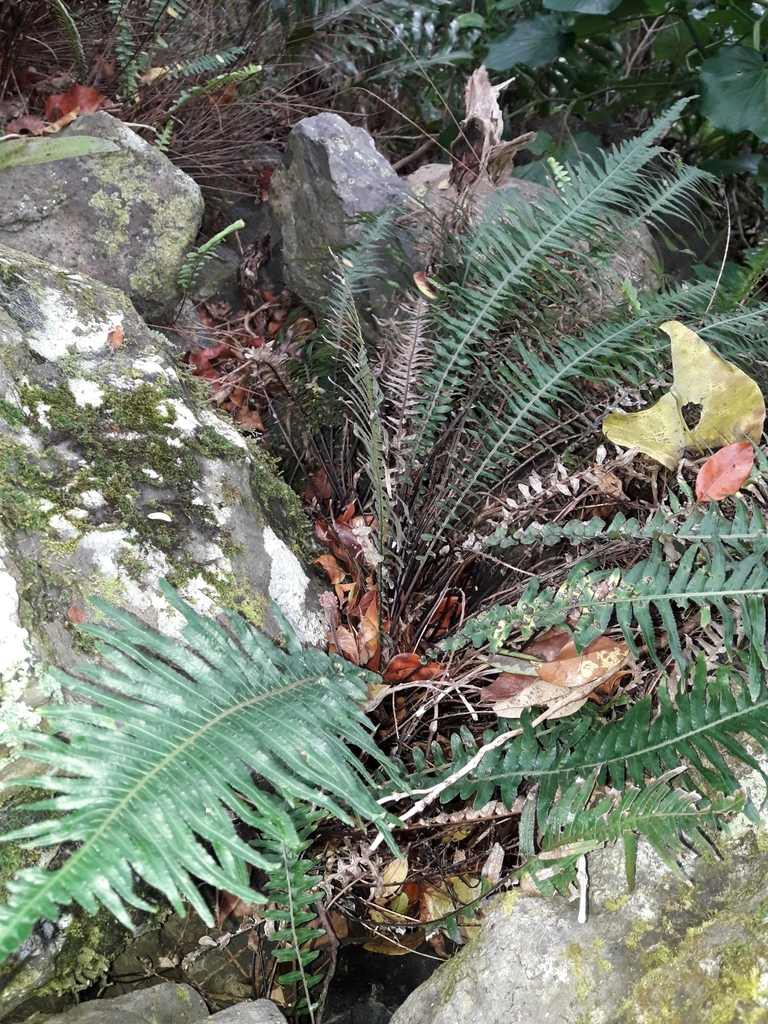
Doodia australis seen on Lord Howe Island

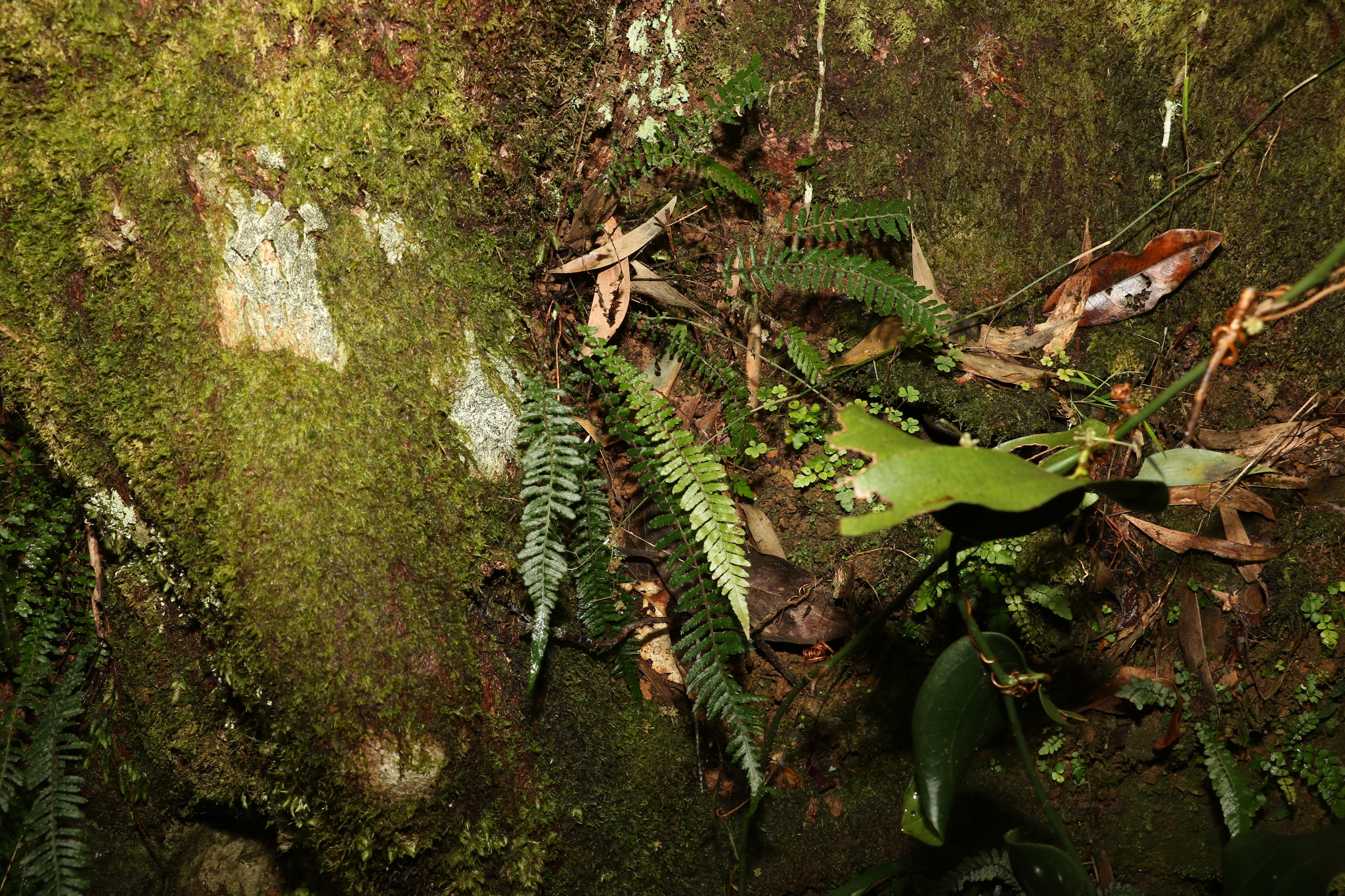
Doodia australis seen in Queensland near the Gold Coast
