= Waiuatua =

Waiuatua may refer to:

- Euphorbia glauca, a New Zealand native coastal plant
- Rhabdothamnus solandri, a New Zealand native forest shrub
