= Whitireia Park =

Park in New Zealand

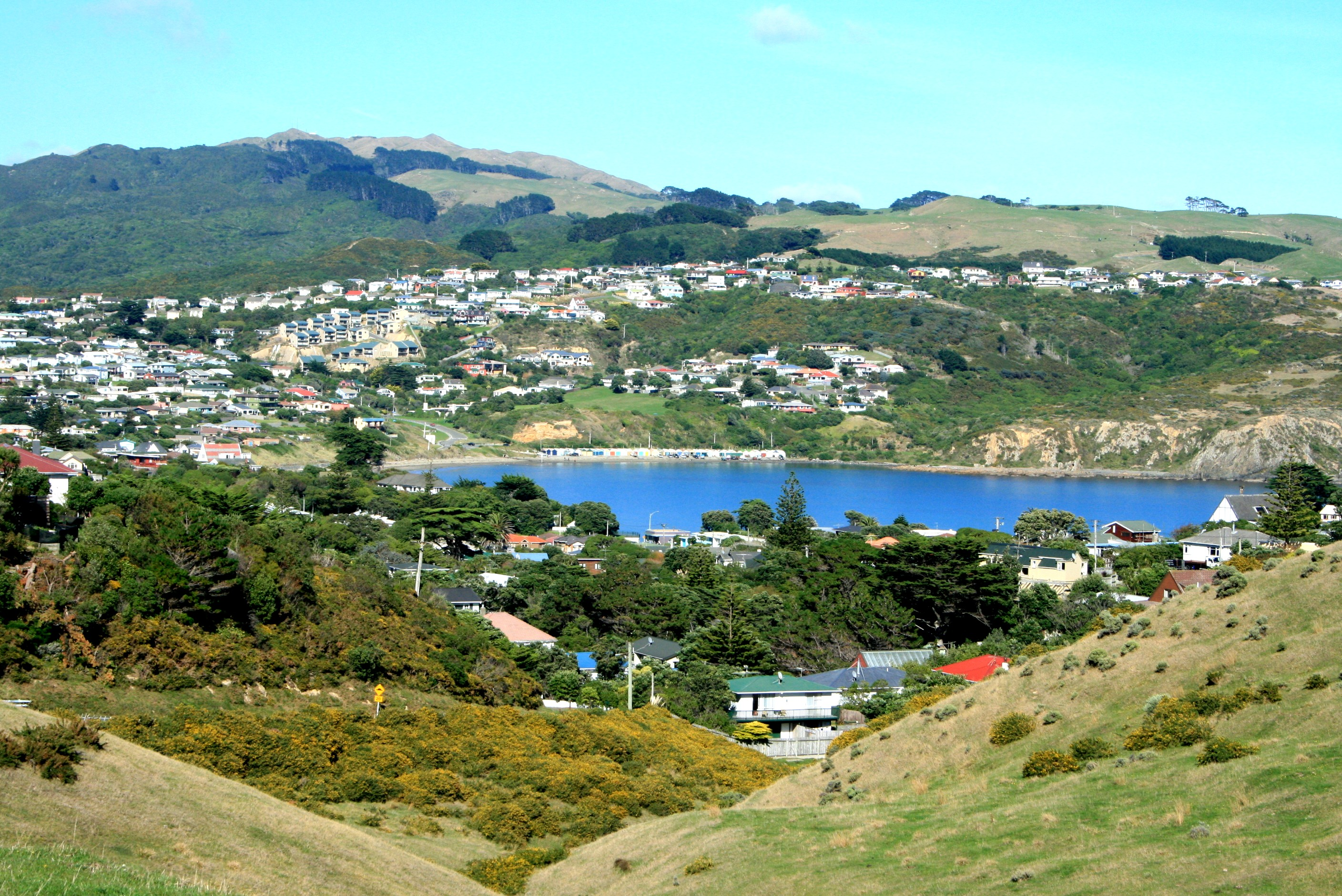
- Whitirea Park, with Tītahi Bay in the background
- Interactive map of Whitireia Park
- Type: Park
- Location: Porirua, Wellington Region, New Zealand
- Coordinates: 41.1063681°S 174.8413128°E
- Area: 180 hectares (440 acres)
- Operator: Whitireia Park Board
- Open: vehicle gates open 8 am–6 pm (April–September) and 6 am–9 pm (October–March)

Whitireia Park is a reserve located on a headland north of Tītahi Bay and Te Awarua-o-Porirua Harbour in Porirua, in the Wellington Region at the southern end of New Zealand's North Island. It is governed by the Whitireia Park Board, a joint entity that includes representatives of Ngāti Toa Rangatira Trust and Wellington Regional Council. Whitireia maunga (mountain) is of great importance to the Ngāti Toa iwi, and is acknowledged in their pepeha (traditional oral introduction).

== Toponymy ==
Ihakara Arthur, a kaumātua (elder) of the Ngāti Toa iwi, has said:

Whitireia is a name our people brought from Hawaiki with them. They believe it came from ngā atua, from the gods. That name is very deep in the Māori world. There are two names in Māoridom that we say are from the gods, and Whitireia is one of them.

The peak at the north east of the headland, at an elevation of 104 m (341 ft), is identified by the New Zealand Geographic Board with an official dual name Whitireia / Mount Couper. The name Couper derives from William Couper (1801–1879), a settler of Scottish descent, who established a sawmill and shipyard at the Porirua Inlet, on land granted to him by the Crown.

== Significance to Ngāti Toa ==
Whitireia maunga (mountain) is of great importance to Ngāti Toa. Whitireia is acknowledged in the pepeha (traditional oral introduction) of Ngāti Toa Rangatira:

Ko Whitireia te maunga
Ko Raukawa te moana
Ko Tainui te waka
Ko Ngāti Toarangatira te iwi
Ko te Rauparaha te tangata

Whitireia is the mountain
Raukawa (Cook Strait) is the sea
Tainui is the waka
Ngāti Toarangatira is the tribe
Te Rauparaha is the man

== History ==
=== Pre-European history ===
Polynesian explorer Kupe is believed to have landed just south of Tītahi Bay at Komangarautawhiri. According to oral history, his canoe floated away on the outgoing tide and then returned to shore on an incoming tide. The anchor stone of Kupe's canoe is believed to have remained in Onehunga Bay for centuries and was respected by Māori tribes. During the 1840s, British troops drowned after breaking chips off the stone, and some Māori believed it was punishment for sacrilege. The stone is now stored at Museum of New Zealand Te Papa Tongarewa, but there is a monument at the Onehunga Bay carpark.

Before European settlement, Māori fished the waters for kina, pāua and kuku.

Ngāti Toa conquered the area in the mid-1820s under the leadership of Te Rauparaha, partly due to its strategic position near early European trading ports. The headland had sparse vegetation, and the population lived on a diet of seafood, bracken ferns and kumara, and their kumara-growing terraces are still visible above the headland cliffs. An archaeological survey by the Department of Conservation suggests Māori occupation continued until 1840s.

=== Gift of land ===
In 1847–48, Ngāti Toa arranged a gift of approximately 200 ha (500 acres) at Whitireia to the Bishop of New Zealand, George Selwyn, via an intermediary Octavius Hadfield (subsequently the Bishop of Wellington from 1870). The background to the gift was that Ngāti Toa sought to have the Anglican Church establish a school for their children on the land. At the time, Māori land could only be acquired by the Crown, so the land was gifted initially to the Governor, who then granted it to the Bishop under a trust (the Porirua Trust). The trust was not executed for a further thirty years. The terms of the trust included that the church would establish a college. When it became clear that a college was not going to be constructed, Ngāti Toa unsuccessfully sought return of the land in court. In 1877, the Supreme Court heard a case Wi Parata v Bishop of Wellington where Wiremu Parata, a Māori chief and politician, claimed a breach of contract and a breach of the Treaty of Waitangi. The claim was unsuccessful, with the Chief Justice James Prendergast declaring on 17 October 1877 that the treaty was 'worthless' and a 'simple nullity'. This case had a major influence on decisions on Treaty of Waitangi issues for many decades. The land was vested in the Porirua College Trust Board in the early 1900s, enabling the land to be sold.

=== Radio transmitter site ===
In 1935, the New Zealand Broadcasting Service purchased 40 ha (99 acres) at Whitireia for the establishment of an AM radio transmitting station. The acquisition of the site was to allow for the transfer of the radio station 2YA from its existing site at Mount Victoria, and to establish 2YA as New Zealand's national emergency radio station. The new Titahi Bay Transmitter station (subsequently part of the RNZ National network) was officially opened by Prime Minister Michael Joseph Savage on 25 January 1937. A replacement antenna constructed in 1979 was 212 m (696 ft) high, New Zealand's tallest man-made structure at the time.

=== Trust reserve ===
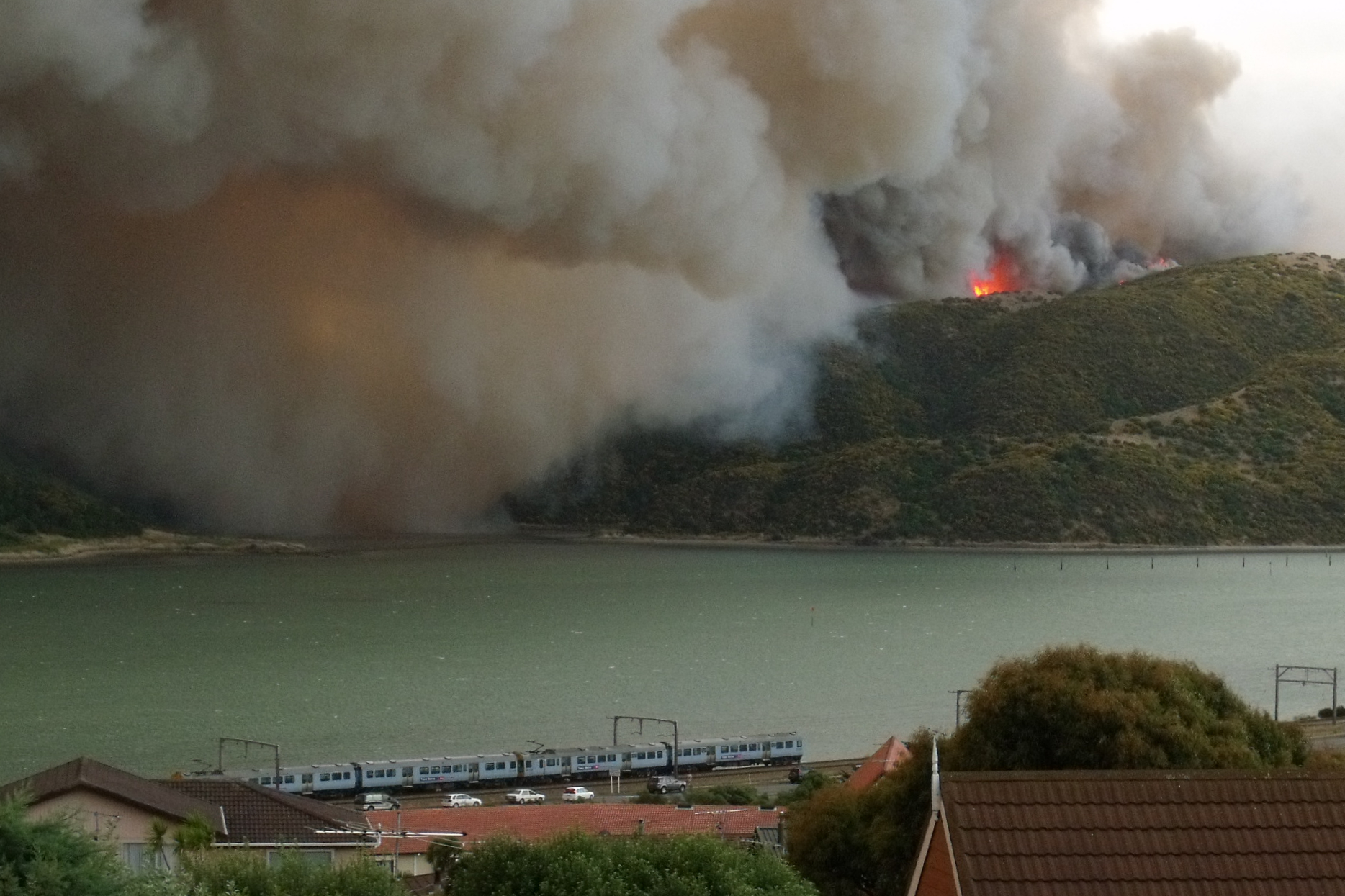
Wildfire in Whitireia Park in 2010

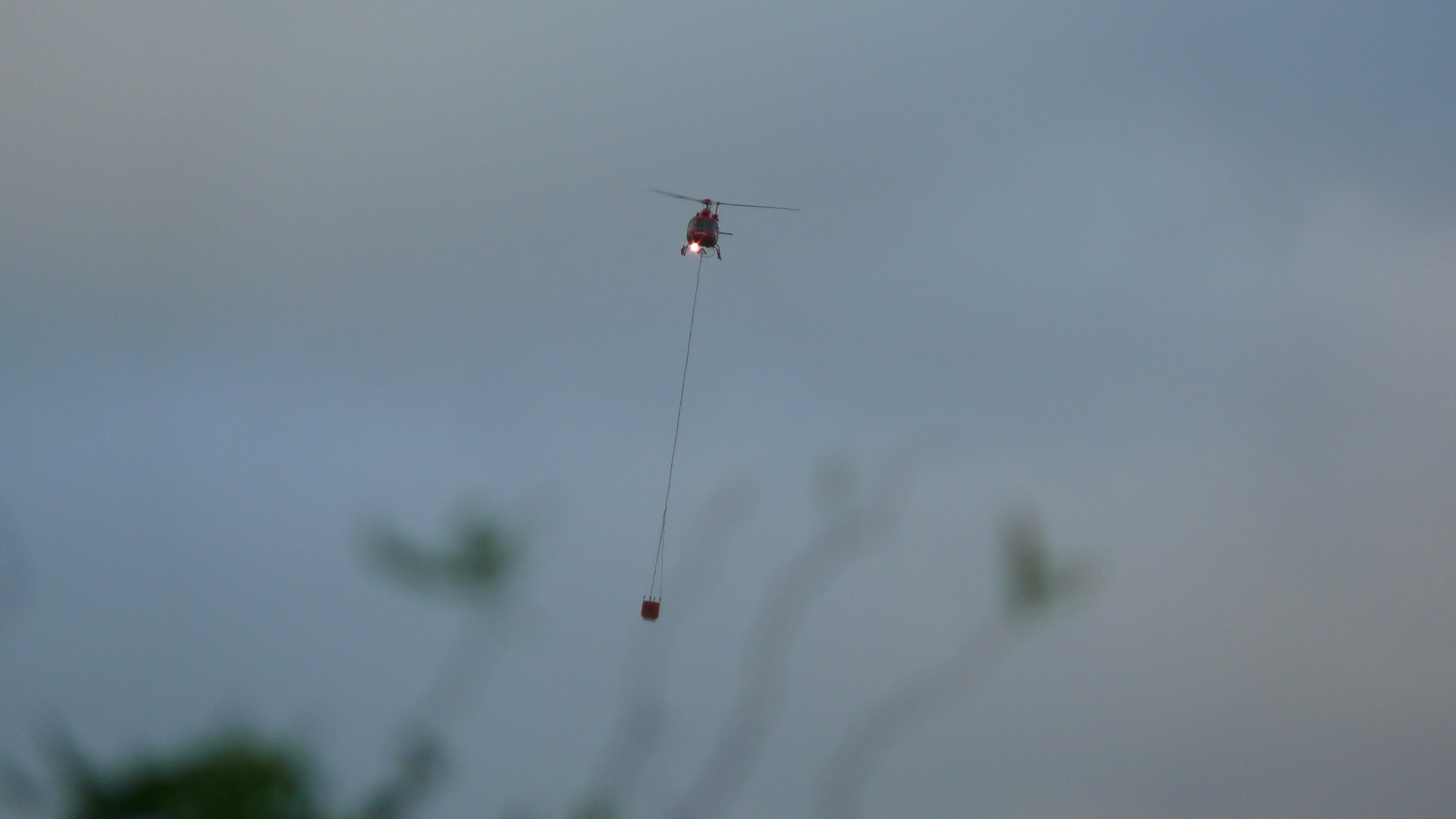
Helicopter fighting the 2010 Whitireia Park wildfire

The park was established by a local trust board and the Broadcasting Corporation of New Zealand in 1976, with support from Ngāti Toa and local businesses. Under a management plan finalised in 1978, the Department of Conservation was also involved in managing the park.

In the decades since, a track has been built around the park, and the New Zealand Defence Force has removed abandoned motor vehicle bodies from around the headland. Radio New Zealand has maintained control of 53 hectares (130 acres) of the park for a radio transmission station, but most of the land is leased for grazing to reduce fire risk. In 2006, work began on replanting the wetland behind the Onehunga Bay carpark. Much of the vegetation on the headland was destroyed in a wildfire in February 2010. Working bees have been organised to replant the park.

=== Park designation ===
Wellington Regional Council took control of the park in March 2011, with Ngāti Toa continuing to be involved in its management.

=== Ngāti Toa Rangatira Claims Settlement Act 2014 ===
The Ngāti Toa Rangatira Claims Settlement Act 2014 provided for settlement of all historical Treaty of Waitangi grievances of Ngāti Toa Rangatira in the top of the South Island, across Cook Strait and in the North Island. As part of the settlement, several sites in Whitireia Park were vested in Ngāti Toa Rangatira, including the Whitireia Urupā, Te Onepoto Bay and Onehunga Bay. The Deed of Settlement also established a joint board to govern the Whitireia Park recreation reserve, along with the Onehunga Bay historic reserve and Te Onepoto Bay recreation reserve. The Whitireia Park Board's members are appointed by the Ngāti Toa Rangatira Trust and Greater Wellington Regional Council. The operations of the park are managed by Greater Wellington Council under direction of the board.

=== Ngāti Toa regains ownership ===
The Ngāti Toa treaty settlement in 2014 returned parts of the block to the iwi, but this did not include the land owned by Radio New Zealand. In 2018, RNZ proposed having some of its greenfield land rezoned for residential development.

In October 2025, Ngāti Toa purchased 53 ha (130 acres) of land at Whitireia from RNZ, reclaiming iwi ownership of all of the sacred maunga (mountain) after 177 years. The Ngāti Toa Rangatira Claims Settlement Act 2014 and Public Works Act gave Ngāti Toa Rangatira first right of refusal over the property. RNZ has leased 12 ha (30 acres) from Ngāti Toa to continue their AM transmission service from the site.

== Geography ==
The park covers 180 hectares (440 acres) of hilly headland, consisting mostly of open grasslands, with some native bush.

The headland has uplifted from the harbour during a series of earthquakes over the past one or two million years. The most recent earthquake in January 1855 created the marshland at Te Onepoto Bay and the western coastline beaches, and made Porirua Harbour too shallow for large sailing ships.

Te Onepoto Bay now provides a habitat for water birds, including kingfishers and white-faced herons. There are also some little shags, black shags, royal spoonbills, black backed gulls and shore plover.

There is 2 hectares (4.9 acres) of remnant coastal kohekohe forest, with two rare Streblus banksii trees and Doodia australis fern. The wetland behind the Onehunga Bay carpark is dominated by toetoe and flax, where pūkeko, paradise ducks and other wetland birds live. The dunes at the bay are also being planted with spinifex, pingao, shore spurge, sand tussock, sand daphne and native iris, where native insects and lizards live.

== Recreation ==
The park has views over Mana Island and the South Island to the west, Te Awarua-o-Porirua Harbour to the east and south.

The Onepoto loop track runs up the hill from Onehunga Bay, down through the inland valley and back through to the bay. It takes almost two hours to complete, and requires moderate fitness and decent footwear. Parts of the track are exposed to sea winds.

The park is also used for fishing, mountain biking, horse riding, rock climbing, bird spotting, orienteering, model plane flying, canoeing, kitesurfing, diving, picnicking and swimming.

The vehicle gates to the park are open 8 am–6 pm (April–September), and 6 am–9 pm (October–March), but always open for access on foot. The park may be closed at any time due to weather conditions. Dog leashes became mandatory at Onehunga Bay from February 2017. Fire and fireworks are banned at all times.
