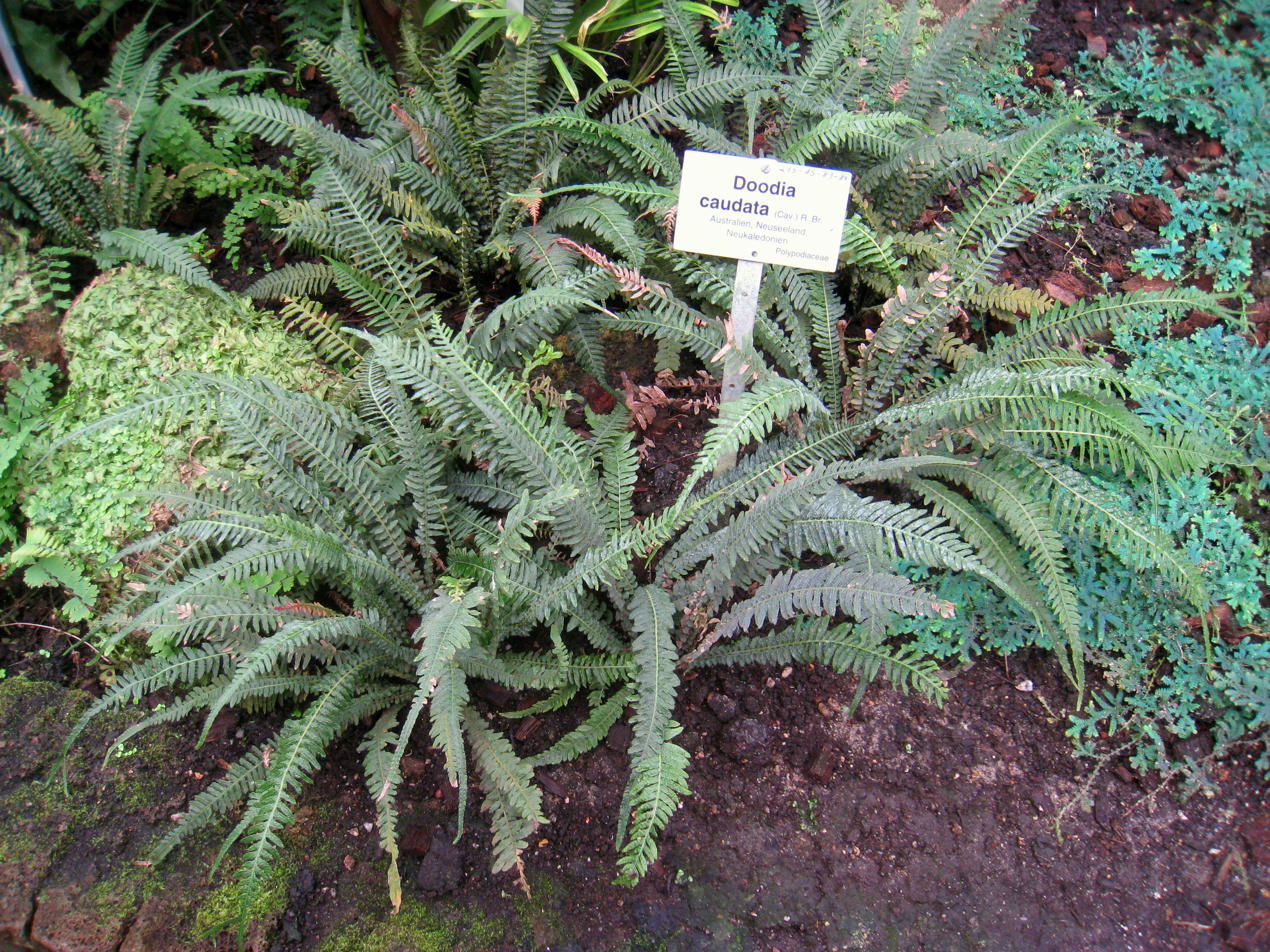
- Doodia caudata

Scientific classification
- Kingdom: Plantae
- Clade: Tracheophytes
- Division: Polypodiophyta
- Class: Polypodiopsida
- Order: Polypodiales
- Suborder: Aspleniineae
- Family: Blechnaceae
- Subfamily: Blechnoideae
- Genus: Doodia; R.Br.

= Doodia =

Genus of ferns

Doodia is a genus of ferns in the family Blechnaceae, subfamily Blechnoideae, in the suborder Aspleniineae (eupolypods II). It is named after Samuel Doody (1656–1706), an English botanist. Distribution of the genus includes parts of Australia and New Zealand.

Phylogenic studies found Doodia to be embedded within the paraphyletic Blechnum as then circumscribed. In 2011, Christenhusz et al. therefore reassigned Doodia species to Blechnum. The alternative taken in the Pteridophyte Phylogeny Group classification of 2016 (PPG I) is to split Blechnum into a number of smaller genera, including Doodia.

== Species ==
As of July 2025, the Checklist of Ferns and Lycophytes of the World accepted the following twenty species and one hybrid:

- Doodia aspera R.Br.
- Doodia australis (Parris) Parris
- Doodia brackenridgei Carruth.
- Doodia caudata (Cav.) R.Br.
- Doodia dissecta Parris
- Doodia dives Kunze
- Doodia gracilis Copel.
- Doodia heterophylla (F.M.Bailey) Domin
- Doodia hindii Tindale ex Chambers
- Doodia kunthiana Gaudich.
- Doodia linearis C. Moore ex J. Sm.
- Doodia lyonii O.Deg.
- Doodia marquesensis E.D.Br.
- Doodia maxima (R.Br.) J.Sm.
- Doodia media R.Br.
- Doodia milnei Carruth.
- Doodia mollis Parris
- Doodia paschalis C.Chr.
- Doodia scaberula Parris
- Doodia squarrosa Colenso

=== Hybrid ===
- Doodia × digena Parris
