= Fieldia =

Fieldia may refer to a number of different genera in various scientific fields:

== Botany ==
- Fieldia (plant) A. Cunningham, 1825, a genus of plants in the family Gesneriaceae. Fieldia is also used as a common name for Fieldia australis, a species in this genus
- Fieldia Gaudichaud, 1829, a synonym of the orchid genus Vandopsis

== Zoology ==
- Fieldia K. Johnson, 1991, a synonym of Calycopis a genus of butterfly in the family Lycaenidae
- Fieldia Niculescu, 1979, a synonym of Vanessa (butterfly)

== Paleontology ==
- Fieldia (worm) Walcott, 1912, a genus of worms in the family Fieldiidae
