= Wero (disambiguation) =

Wero is a European payment system.

Wero may also refer to:

- Wero (Māori), a traditional Māori challenge
- Wero Tāroi (c.1810–1880), a New Zealand Māori carver
- WERO, a radio station in North Carolina, US
