= Mihi (Māori culture) =

In Māori, a mihi or mihi whakatau is a formal or semi-formal speech or speeches of greeting at a meeting such as a hui. The speech acknowledges those present, and may be accompanied by other ritual greetings or acknowledgements, such as pōwhiri, wero, or recital of pepeha. The term mihimihi is often used when speeches and introductions are exchanged.

Mihi, in its plural form, ngā mihi, is often used as an acknowledgement and giving of thanks. In modern Māori, it is often used as a way of signing off a letter or email.
