= Pumpkin tree =

Pumpkin tree is a common name for several plants and may refer to:

- Negria: a Gesneriaceae native to sub-tropical Australia
- Solanum aethiopicum: a Solanum grown world-wide, used for decorative & culinary purposes
