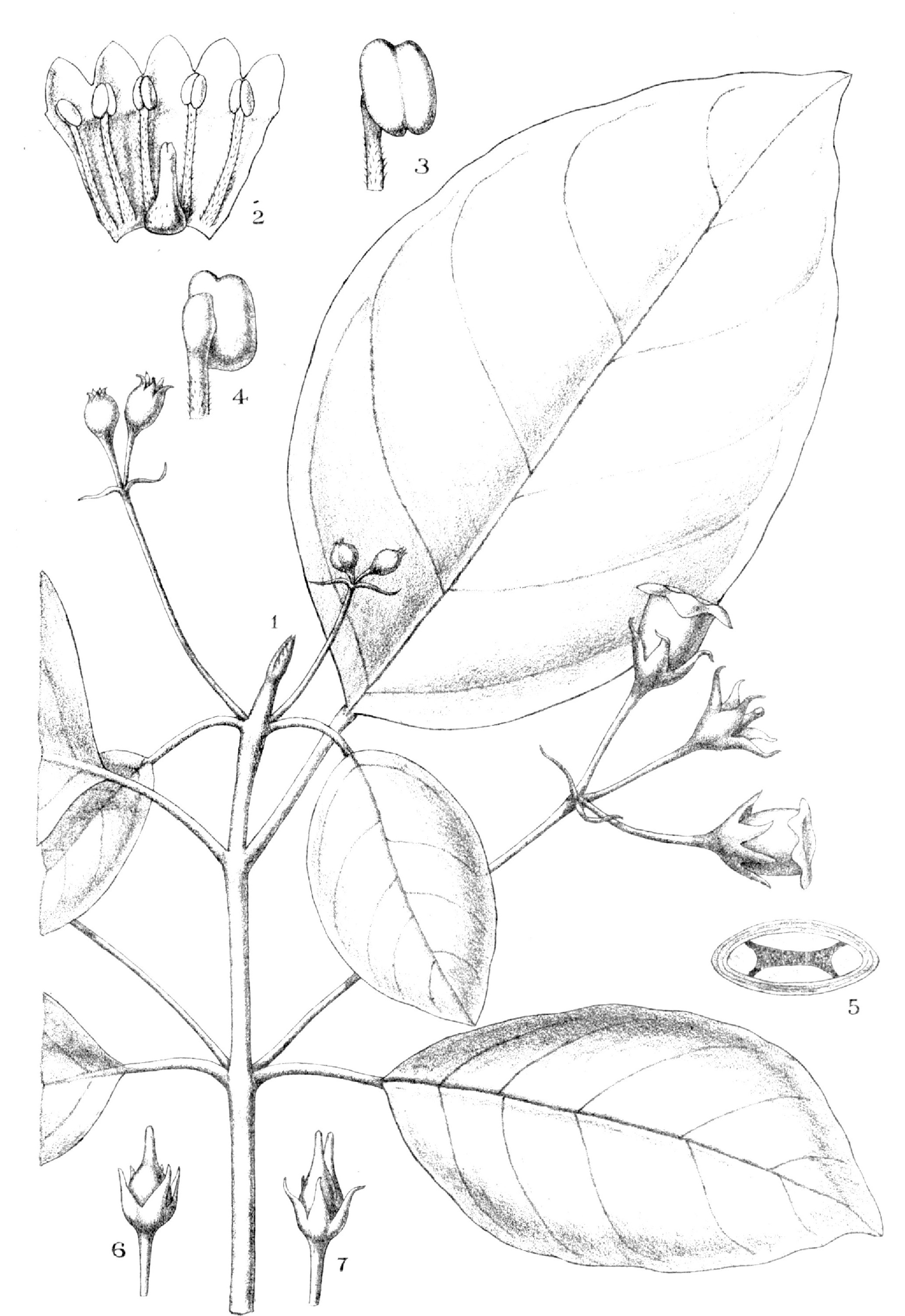
- Depanthus glaber

Scientific classification
- Kingdom: Plantae
- Clade: Tracheophytes
- Clade: Angiosperms
- Clade: Eudicots
- Clade: Asterids
- Order: Lamiales
- Family: Gesneriaceae
- Genus: Depanthus; S.Moore

= Depanthus =

Genus of flowering plants

Depanthus is a genus of shrubs in the family Gesneriaceae. The genus is endemic to New Caledonia in the Pacific and contains two species. It is related to Negria and Fieldia (syn. Lenbrassia).

== List of species ==
- Depanthus glaber (C.B.Clarke) S.Moore
- Depanthus pubescens Guillaumin
