= Onehunga (disambiguation) =

Onehunga is a suburb of Auckland, New Zealand.

Onehunga may also refer to:

- Onehunga (New Zealand electorate)
- Onehunga Bay, in Whitireia Park, Porirua, New Zealand
- Onehunga Bay, in Onehunga, Auckland
- Onehunga railway station
- Onehunga Sports, a football club in Auckland
