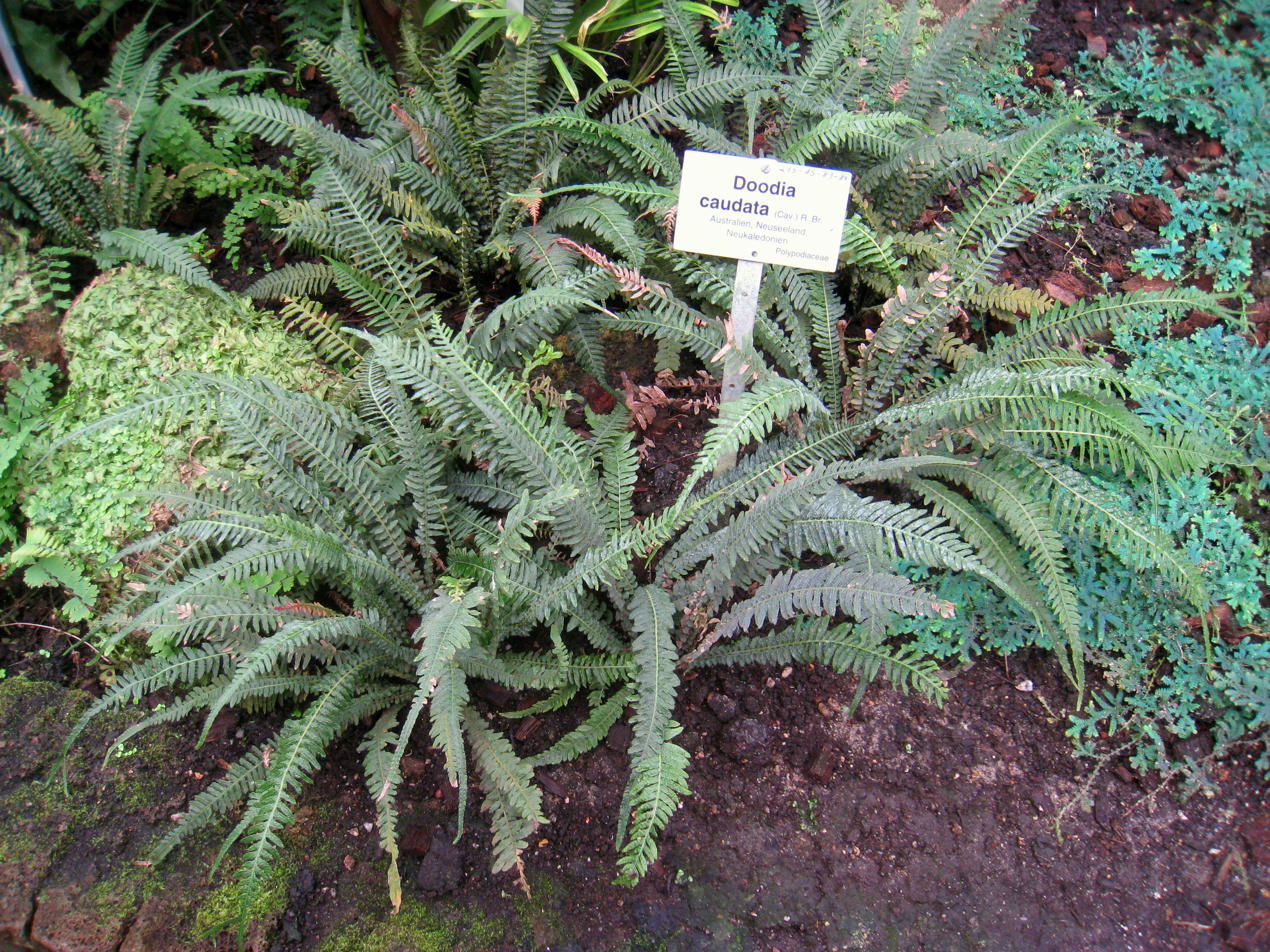

Scientific classification
- Kingdom: Plantae
- Clade: Embryophytes
- Clade: Tracheophytes
- Division: Polypodiophyta
- Class: Polypodiopsida
- Order: Polypodiales
- Suborder: Aspleniineae
- Family: Blechnaceae
- Genus: Doodia
- Species: D. caudata

Binomial name
- Doodia caudata (Cav.) R.Br.

= Doodia caudata =

Species of fern

Doodia caudata is a species of dimorphic, evergreen fern in the family Blechnaceae, native to Australia and New Zealand. Upright clusters of fertile fronds reach 25 cm (10 in) in length. It has been introduced to the Azores, Madeira and Sri Lanka.
