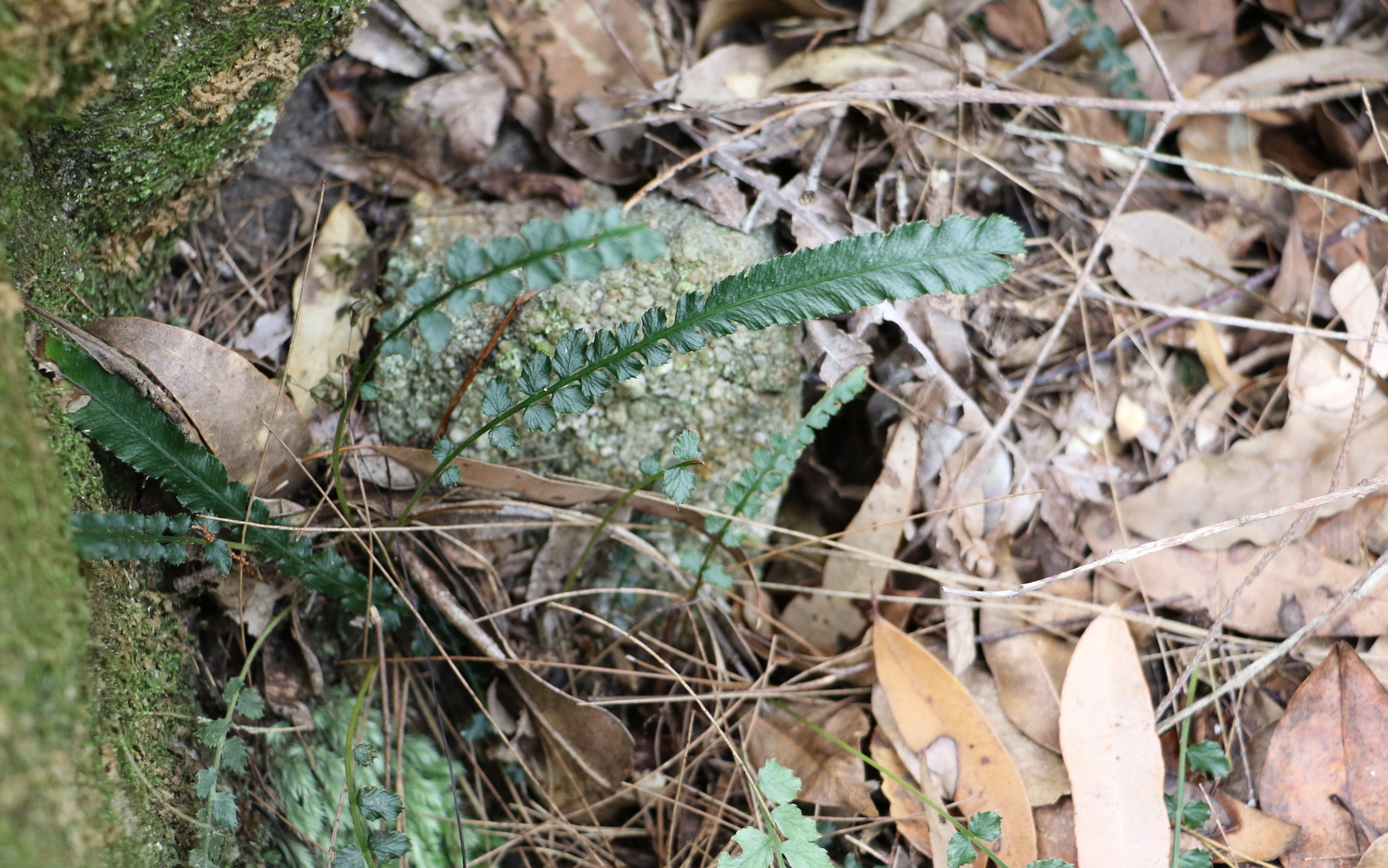
- Berowra Valley National Park, Australia

Scientific classification
- Kingdom: Plantae
- Clade: Tracheophytes
- Division: Polypodiophyta
- Class: Polypodiopsida
- Order: Polypodiales
- Suborder: Aspleniineae
- Family: Blechnaceae
- Genus: Doodia
- Species: D. linearis

Binomial name
- Doodia linearis C.Moore ex J.Sm.

Synonyms
- Blechnum lineare (C.Moore ex J.Sm.) Christenh.; Doodia caudata var. laminosa F.Muell.

= Doodia linearis =

Species of fern

Doodia linearis (synonym Blechnum lineare) is a small fern found in eastern Australia. The habitat is sloping ground, often by creeks, in rainforest or dry eucalyptus forest. This species is endemic to Queensland.
