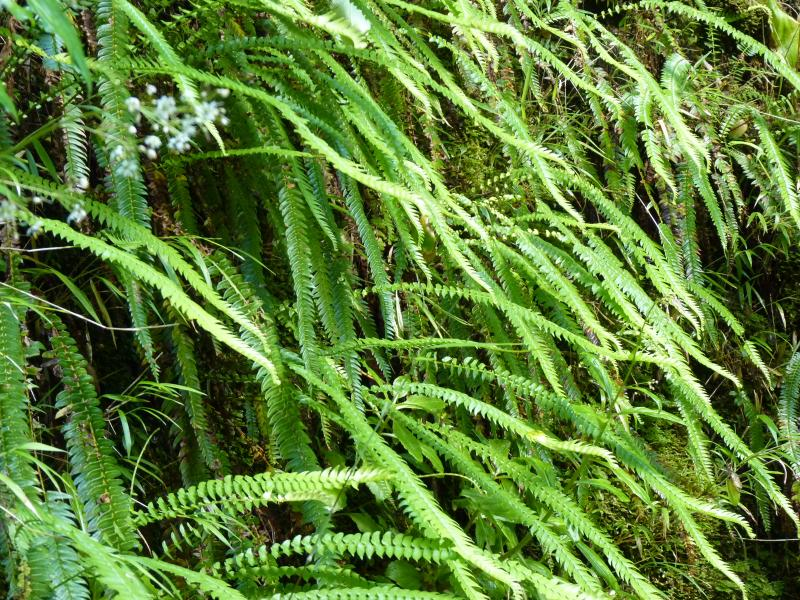

Scientific classification
- Kingdom: Plantae
- Clade: Tracheophytes
- Division: Polypodiophyta
- Class: Polypodiopsida
- Order: Polypodiales
- Suborder: Aspleniineae
- Family: Blechnaceae
- Genus: Blechnum
- Species: B. arcuatum

Binomial name
- Blechnum arcuatum J. Rémy ex Fée

= Blechnum arcuatum =

Species of fern

Blechnum arcuatum, known locally as quil-quil, is a fern native with a natural range in Chile ranging from Ñuble River (~36° S) in the north to Aysén Region (~47° S) including adjacent areas of Argentina. It is found from sea level up to 1300 masl and is associated with water courses or humid road cuts.

== Sources ==
- (in Spanish) Florachilena.cl
