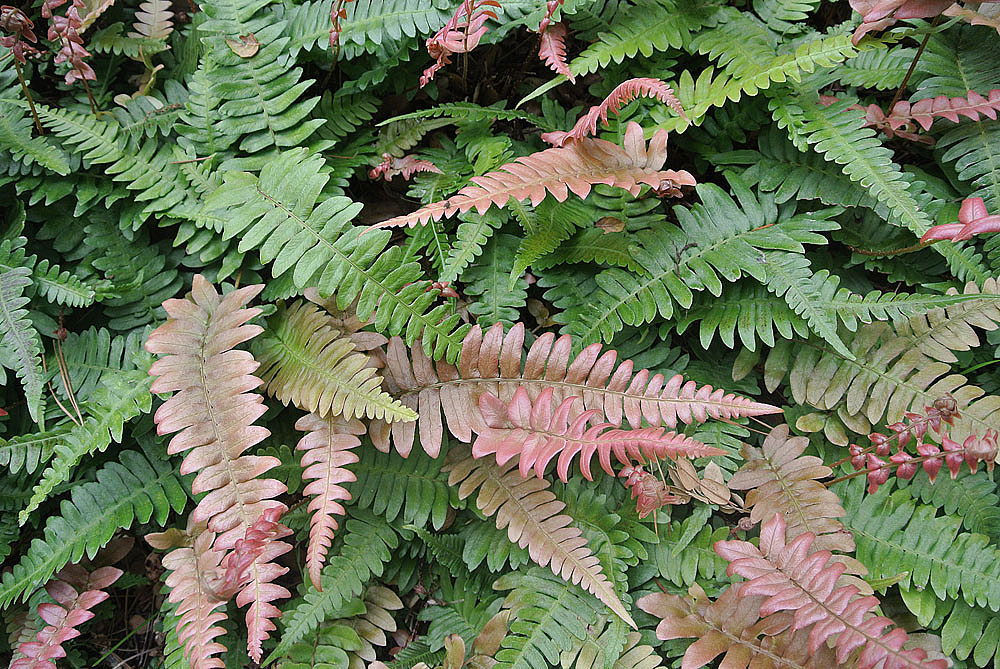
- In cultivation at Lotusland, Montecito, California

Conservation status
- Vulnerable (IUCN 3.1)

Scientific classification
- Kingdom: Plantae
- Clade: Tracheophytes
- Division: Polypodiophyta
- Class: Polypodiopsida
- Order: Polypodiales
- Suborder: Aspleniineae
- Family: Blechnaceae
- Genus: Blechnum
- Species: B. occidentale

Binomial name
- Blechnum occidentale L.

Synonyms
- Blechnum acuminatum Fée; Blechnum campylotis (Kunze) J.Sm.; Blechnum cartilagineum Schkuhr; Blechnum ciliatum M.Martens & Galeotti; Blechnum cognatum C.Presl; Blechnum cunninghamii T.Moore; Blechnum drepanophyllum Trevis.; Blechnum extensum Fée; Blechnum falcatum Link; Blechnum falciculatum C.Presl; Blechnum galeottii T.Moore; Blechnum glandulosum Wall.; Blechnum haenkeanum Trevis.; Blechnum helveolum Fée; Blechnum humile Salisb.; Blechnum lomariaceum Sodiro; Blechnum mucronatum Fée; Blechnum pectinatum Hook.; Blechnum rugosum T.Moore; Blechnum scaberulum Sodiro; Blechnum sodiroi C.Chr.; Blechnum suburbicum Vell.; Blechnum triangulatum J.Sm.; Lomaria campylotis Kunze; Mesothema campylotis C.Presl; Spicanta occidentalis (L.) Kuntze; Struthiopteris appendiculata Trevis.; Struthiopteris caudata Maxon

= Blechnum occidentale =

Species of fern

Blechnum occidentale is a fern in the family Blechnaceae. Its native range is from Mexico through Central America and the Caribbean to tropical South America.

Blechnum scaberulum and Blechnum sodiroi have been regarded as separate species, but are now regarded as synonyms of Blechnum occidentale.
