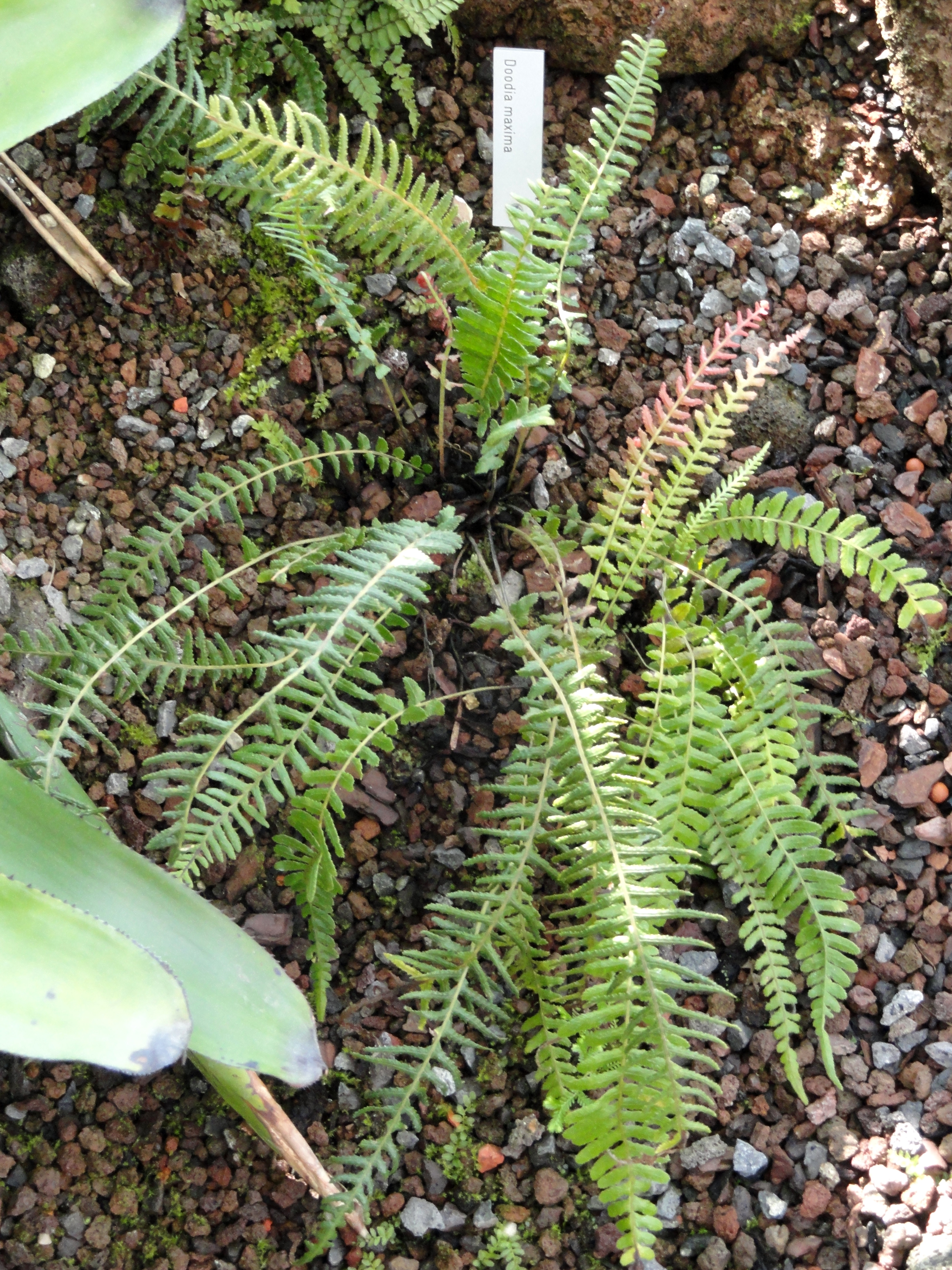

Scientific classification
- Kingdom: Plantae
- Clade: Tracheophytes
- Division: Polypodiophyta
- Class: Polypodiopsida
- Order: Polypodiales
- Suborder: Aspleniineae
- Family: Blechnaceae
- Genus: Doodia
- Species: D. maxima

Binomial name
- Doodia maxima (R.Br.) J.Sm.

Synonyms
- Doodia aspera var. blechnoides (Fée) Bailey; Doodia blechnoides A.Cunn.; Blechnum maximum (R.Br. ex C.Chr.) Christenh.; Woodwardia blechnoides Fée; Woodwardia desvauxii Moore

= Doodia maxima =

Species of fern

Doodia maxima (synonym Blechnum maximum), also known as the giant rasp fern, occurs in moist open forests in eastern Australia. It was considered to be a natural hybrid. Some sources place the species in the genus Blechnum, others, including the Pteridophyte Phylogeny Group classification of 2016 (PPG I), place it in Doodia.
