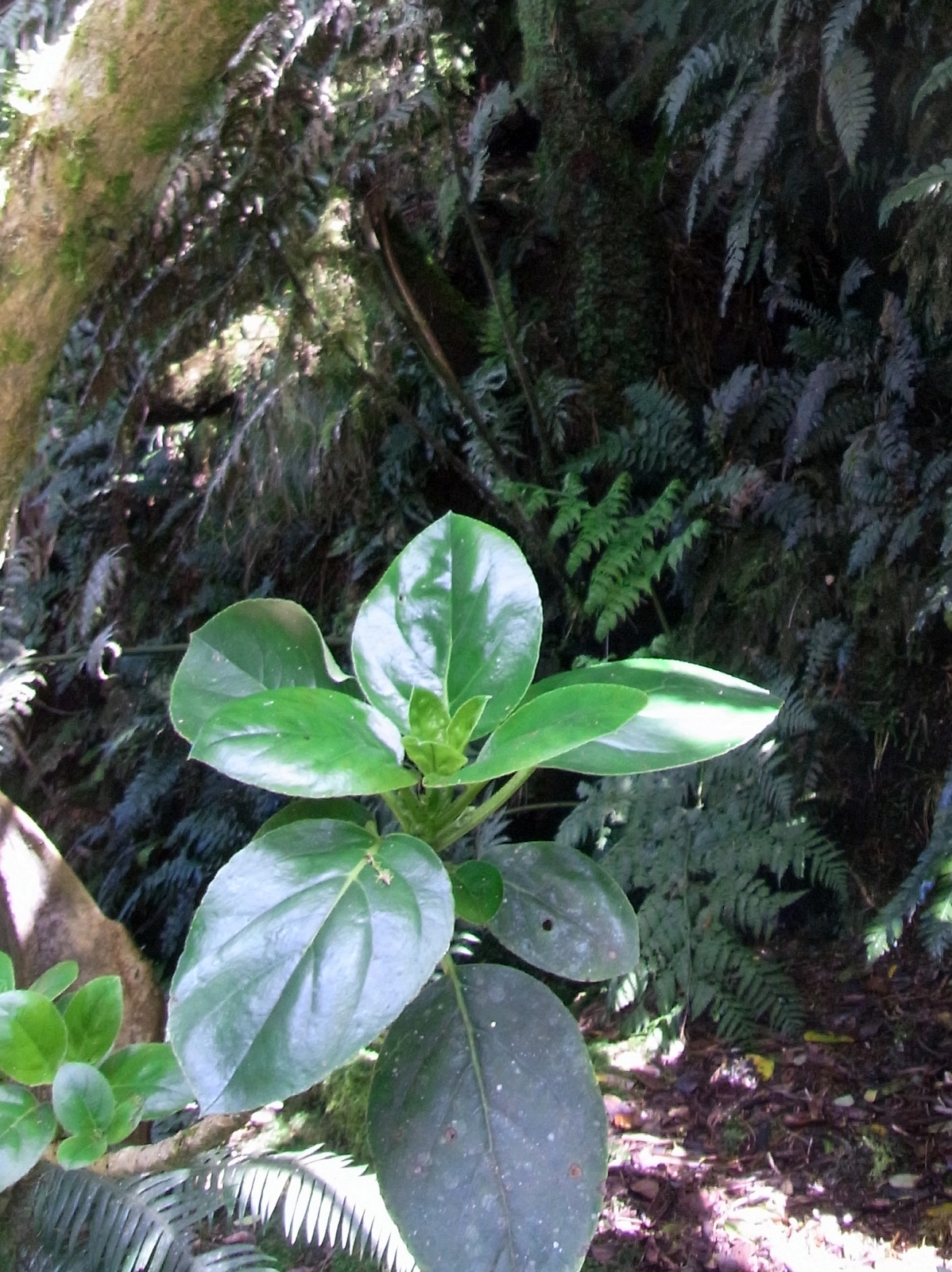

Scientific classification
- Kingdom: Plantae
- Clade: Tracheophytes
- Clade: Angiosperms
- Clade: Eudicots
- Clade: Asterids
- Order: Lamiales
- Family: Gesneriaceae
- Genus: Negria; F.Muell. (1871)
- Species: N. rhabdothamnoides

Binomial name
- Negria rhabdothamnoides F.Muell. (1871)
- Negria is endemic to Lord Howe Island

= Negria =

Genus of trees

Negria is a plant genus in the family Gesneriaceae. Its only species is Negria rhabdothamnoides, commonly known as the pumpkin tree. It is related to Fieldia (syn. Lenbrassia) and Depanthus.

== Description ==
The pumpkin tree grows to about 8 m in height. It has pale, corky bark and soft, brittle wood. The ovate to broadly elliptic leaves are 70–200 mm long and 45–100 mm wide; they have glossy upper surfaces and are pale and sparsely haired beneath. The flowers are large and orange with small red dots, appearing over summer from October to April. The fruit is a black, beaked capsule 15 mm long which holds numerous tiny, wind-dispersed seeds.

== Distribution and habitat ==
The species is endemic to Australia's subtropical Lord Howe Island in the Tasman Sea. The trees are found in the moist mountain forest of Lord Howe from about 500 m above sea level to the highest peaks at nearly 900 m.

== See also ==
- Rhabdothamnus; this species has originally labelled in F. Mueller's collections as Rhabdothamnus negriana F.Muell., a name which he did not publish, but listed as a synonym.
