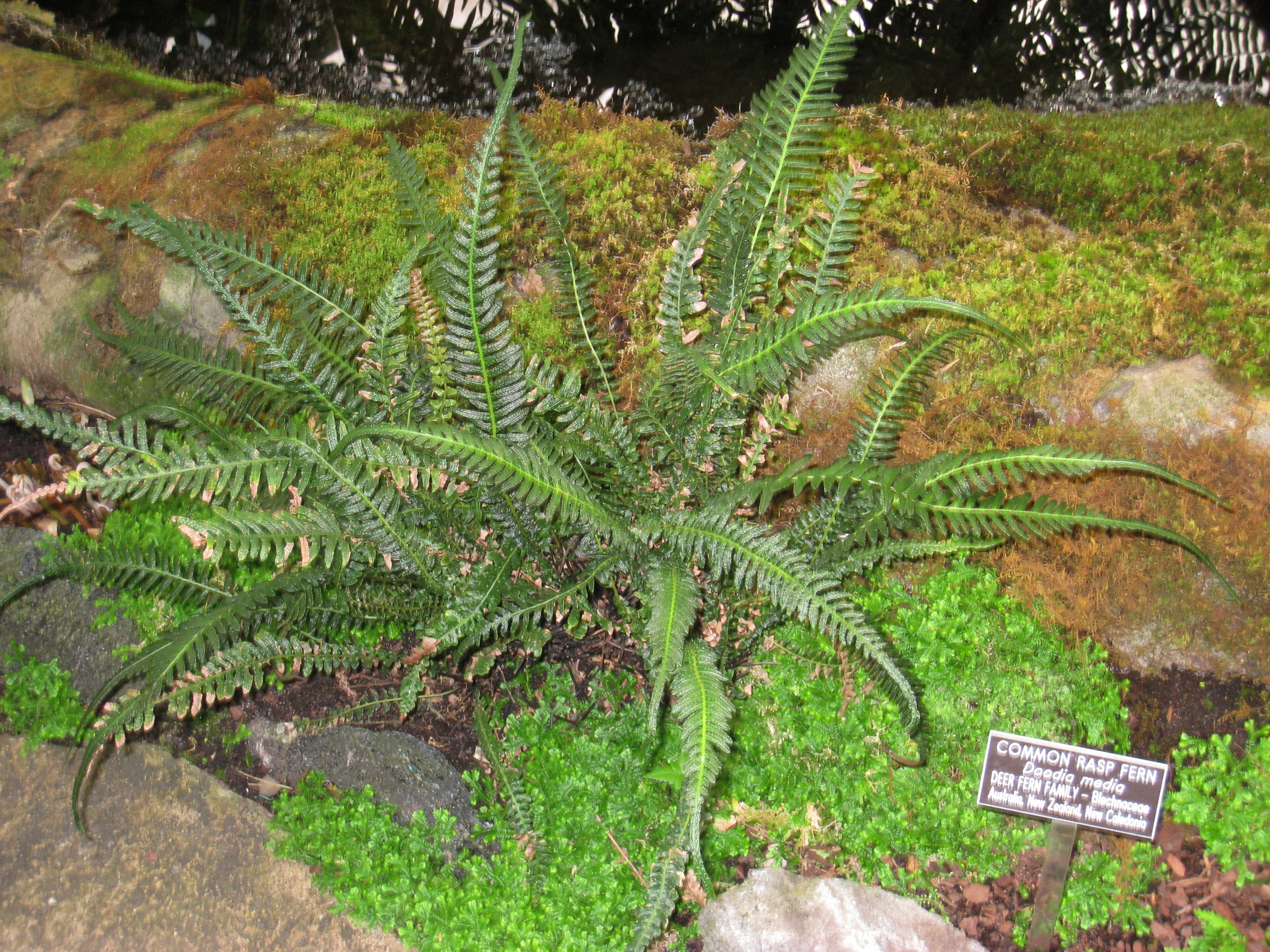

Scientific classification
- Kingdom: Plantae
- Clade: Tracheophytes
- Division: Polypodiophyta
- Class: Polypodiopsida
- Order: Polypodiales
- Suborder: Aspleniineae
- Family: Blechnaceae
- Genus: Doodia
- Species: D. media

Binomial name
- Doodia media R.Br.

Synonyms
- Blechnum medium (R.Br.) Christenh.; Doodia aucklandica Field; Doodia caudata var. media (R.Br.) Benth.; Doodia caudata var. triloba F.Muell.; Doodia caudata f. triloba (F.Muell.) Domin; Doodia connexa Kunze; Doodia duriuscula Moore; Doodia lunulata R.Br.; Doodia polysora Terracino; Woodwardia connexa (Kunze) Fée; Woodwardia lunulata Fée; Woodwardia media Fée

= Doodia media =

Species of fern

Doodia media, also known as rasp fern (or pukupuku in Māori), is a fern species in the family Blechnaceae. The species was formally described by botanist Robert Brown in 1810. Distribution of the species includes New Zealand's North Island and the upper part of the South Island (Nelson and Marlborough). It is also found in Australia and Lord Howe Island.

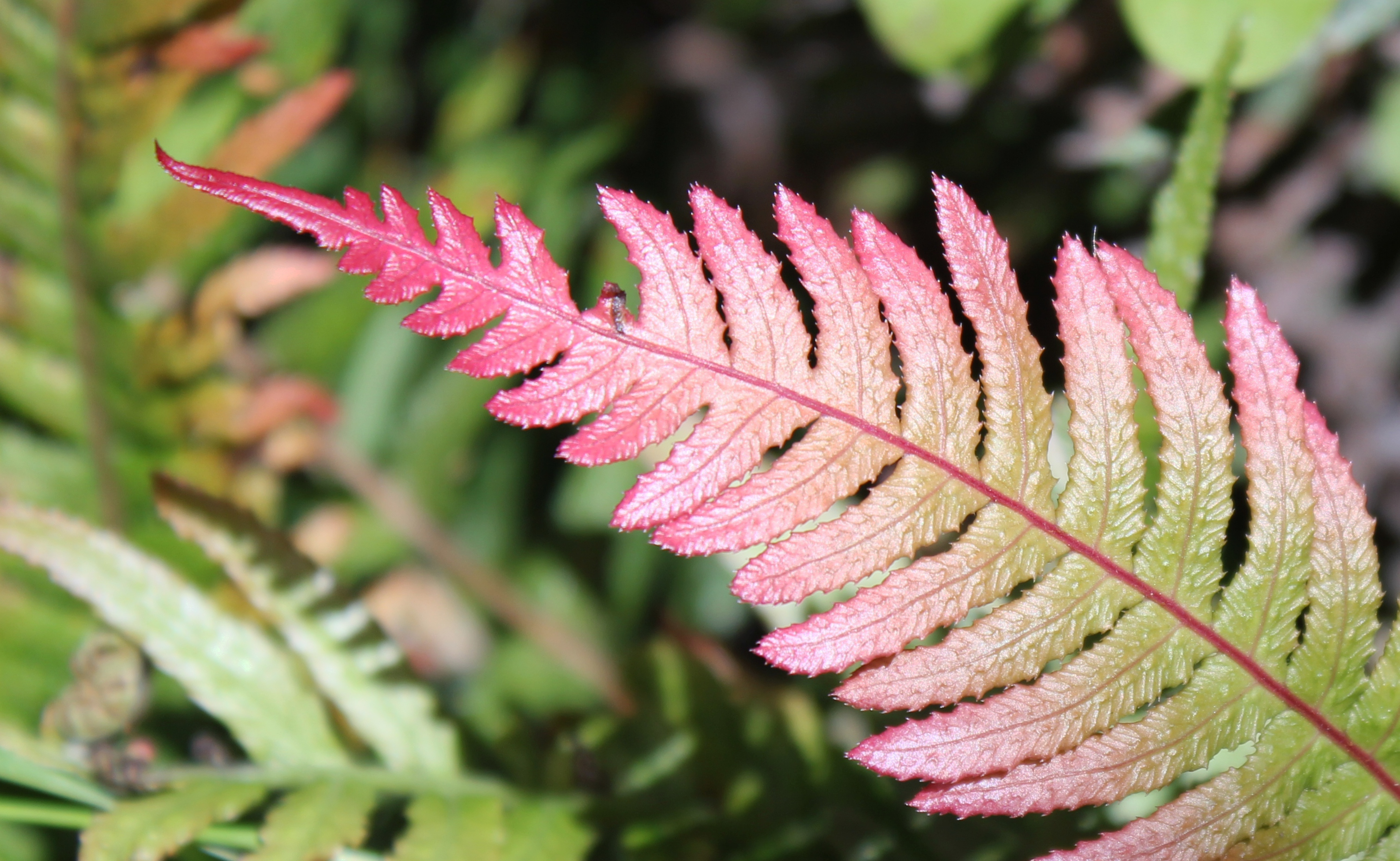
Flavonoids colour the tips of young fronds pink.

Young fronds contain flavonoids that protect them from ultraviolet radiation and give them a pink colour.

Phylogenic studies have shown that the genus Doodia is embedded within the paraphyletic genus Blechnum, when that genus is broadly circumscribed. Christenhusz et al., 2011, therefore reassigned all Doodia species to Blechnum. Doodia media R.Br. was transferred to Blechnum medium and Doodia media subsp. australis (Doodia australis) was transferred to Blechnum parrisii. Other sources, such as World Ferns, based on the Pteridophyte Phylogeny Group classification, split Blechnum, accepting Doodia.
