= Pepeha =

Traditional oral introduction in Māori culture

Millan Ruka gives a pepeha in Te Reo Māori

A pepeha is a traditional oral recitation given by a person when introducing themselves in the Māori culture of New Zealand. It is often part of a formal greeting or mihi.

A pepeha is given in the form of a list, telling a story of a person's connection with the land and with the people on it, a reflection of the Māori people's name for themselves: tangata whenua (literally "people of the land"). Pepeha are often given on formal occasions, such as at a hui. It is possible for one person to have more than one pepeha, especially if they are linked to more than one iwi.

== Typical format ==
Most pepeha follow a ritual format, starting with a greeting, then listing personal connections to the land — a personal mountain and river — before listing iwi affiliation, family, place of residence, and name.

A typical pepeha may take the following form. This pepeha is for a person called Tīpene, from the Kāi Tahu iwi and living in Dunedin (Ōtepoti):

Tēnā koutou katoa (greetings to all of you)
Ko Kirimoko te māunga (my mountain is Kirimoko)
Ko Waitati te awa (my river is the Waitati)
Ko Tākitimu te waka (my ancestral canoe is the Tākitimu)
Ko Kāi Tahu tōku iwi (my tribe is Kāi Tahu)
Ko Kāti Huirapa tōku hapū (my sub-tribe is Kāti Huirapa)
Nō Ōtepoti ahau (I am from Dunedin)
Ko Tīpene tōku ingoa (My name is Tīpene/Stephen)
Tēnā tātou katoa (greetings to all of us)

== Use by non-Māori ==
While the use of a standard pepeha by Pākehā and other non-Māori is acceptable, some authorities suggest an amended form of the pepeha in those instances where one is needed. One such formulation begins with the greeting, followed by "[name of country] is my ancestry, but [place] is where I grew up", followed by the usual formulation.

== See also ==
- Māori culture
- Whakapapa
