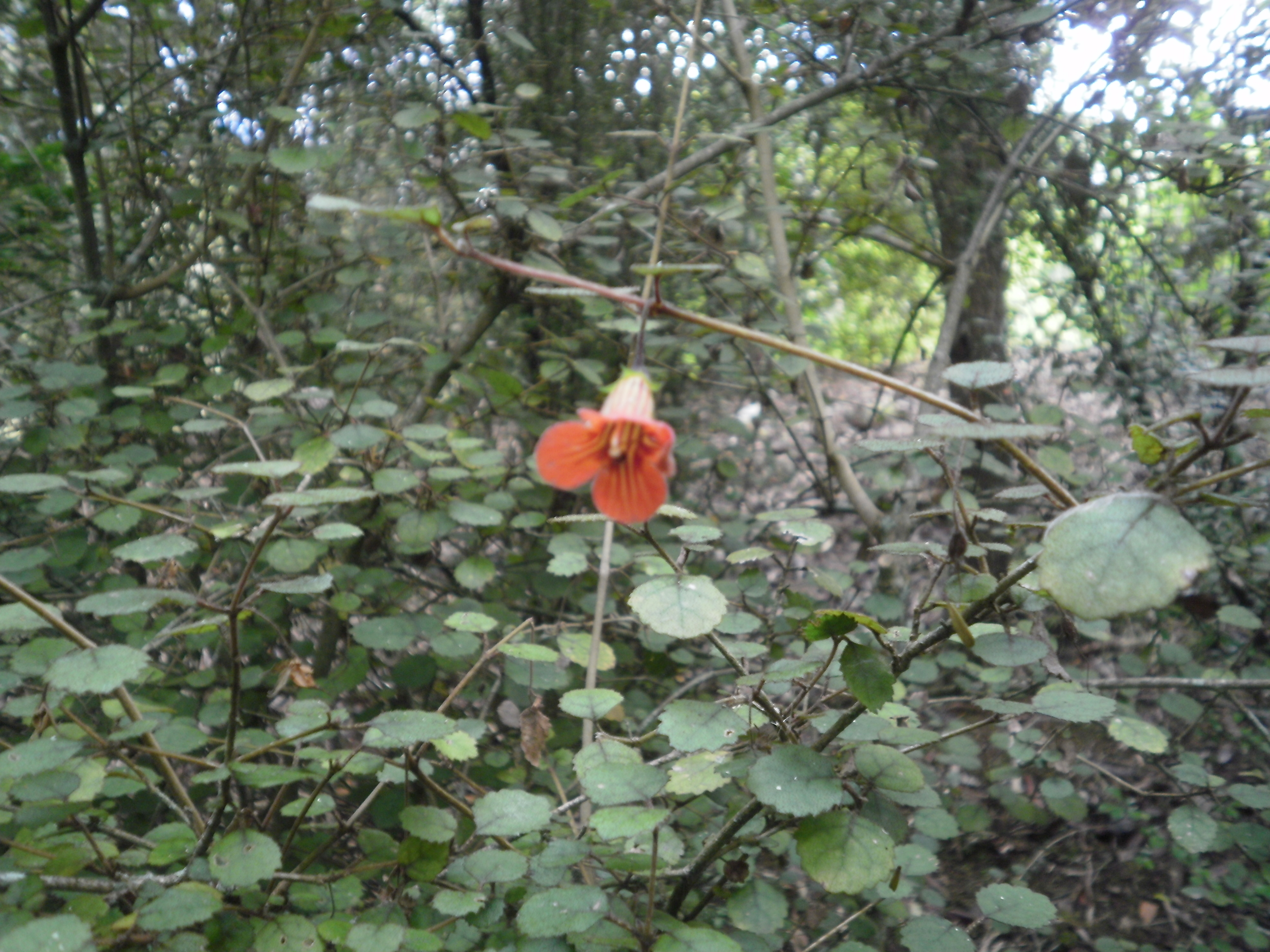

Scientific classification
- Kingdom: Plantae
- Clade: Tracheophytes
- Clade: Angiosperms
- Clade: Eudicots
- Clade: Asterids
- Order: Lamiales
- Family: Gesneriaceae
- Genus: Rhabdothamnus; A.Cunn. (1838)
- Species: R. solandri

Binomial name
- Rhabdothamnus solandri A.Cunn. (1838)

Synonyms
- Columnea scabrosa Sol. ex DC. (1845), nom. superfl.; Rhabdothamnus scabrosus Steud. (1841)

= Rhabdothamnus =

Rhabdothamnus solandri

Genus of plants

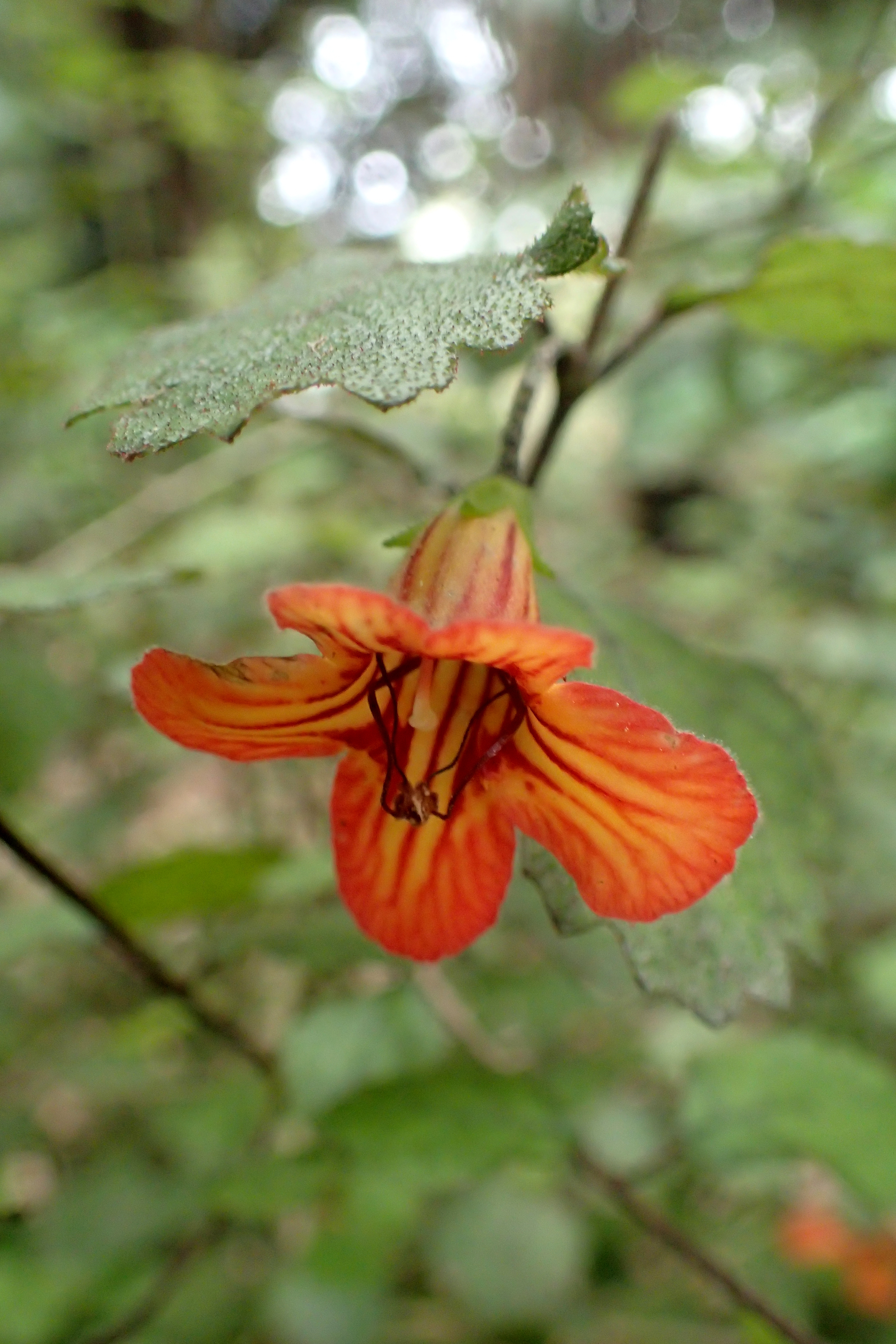
Flower

Rhabdothamnus solandri is a small shrub of the family Gesneriaceae endemic to New Zealand. It is the only plant of the genus Rhabdothamnus, and the only member of Gesneriaceae native to New Zealand. Its common names are New Zealand gloxinia and, in the Māori language, taurepo, mātātā, and waiū-atua.

The species is found throughout the North Island, less commonly in the southern part of the island, and its offshore islands, in a variety of locations such as forests, near streams, or on banks. It grows as a shrub up to 2 metres tall. It has distinctive trumpet-shaped flowers that are modest-sized at 2–2.5, and up to 4, centimetres long. The flowers are usually orange, but sometimes brick-red, yellow, purple or pink, and are longitudinally striped by 12–14, even up to 20, red or dark orange veins. It flowers year-round, peaking between October and February.

The flowers are pollinated mainly by the bellbird, tūī and stitchbird. The silvereye, which is a 19th-century immigrant to New Zealand that has not co-evolved with this and other native plants, has a beak too short to pollinate the flowers, but sometimes rips through the sides of the flowers to steal nectar. The local extinction of the bellbird and stitchbird in the upper North Island in around 1870, and the retreat of tūī to higher canopy and more nectar-rich exotic flowers, has caused a long-term reduction in the reproduction of the shrub, which requires pollination to produce seeds. However, as the plant is slow-growing and long-lived, its populations persist. Due to extinction debt, the future extinction of this shrub is nearly guaranteed.

== See also ==
- Negria; the species Negria rhabdothamnoides F.Muell. was initially listed in F.Mueller's collections as Rhabdothamnus negriana, although he did not publish that name.
