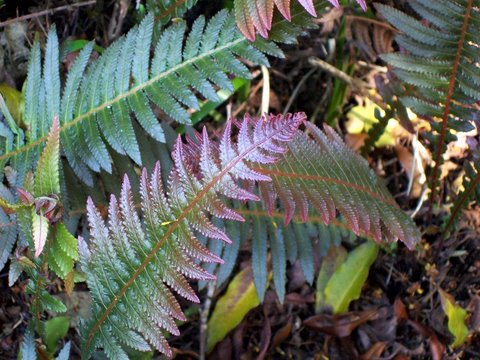
- Growing at Eastwood, Australia

Scientific classification
- Kingdom: Plantae
- Clade: Tracheophytes
- Division: Polypodiophyta
- Class: Polypodiopsida
- Order: Polypodiales
- Suborder: Aspleniineae
- Family: Blechnaceae
- Genus: Doodia
- Species: D. aspera

Binomial name
- Doodia aspera R.Br.

Synonyms
- Blechnum neohollandicum Christenh.; Woodwardia aspera (R.Br.) Fée

= Doodia aspera =

Prickly rasp fern

Species of fern

Doodia aspera, commonly known as prickly rasp fern, is a widespread and common plant, growing in eastern Australia. Often seen in rainforest margins or eucalyptus forest in Victoria, New South Wales and Queensland, it is a terrestrial fern with reddish new growth.

== Taxonomy ==
Doodia aspera was one of the many species first described by the botanist Robert Brown in his 1810 work Prodromus Florae Novae Hollandiae et Insulae Van Diemen, and it still bears its original name. The genus is named for Samuel Doody, curator of the Chelsea Physic Garden, and the species name aspera is the feminine form of the Latin adjective asper "rough", referring to the rachis and stipe.

== Description ==
Prickly rasp fern grows as fronds which rise vertically from the black scaled rhizome. These fronds are usually 20 to 45 cm (7.9 to 17.7 in) long. The frond segments have dentate (toothed) margins, and measure around 6 cm (2.4 in) long, and in a zig-zag pattern up the stem. Both the fronds and stipe are covered in small bumps, giving them a rough texture. When young, the fronds are a pinkish colour which changes to green with maturity.

== Distribution and habitat ==
Doodia aspera is found all along eastern New South Wales, and into Victoria and Queensland. It is particularly common in the Blue Mountains west of Sydney. It grows on sandstone and igneous (granite and basalt) substrates, in sand- or gravelly soils It is also found on Norfolk Island.

In tall open forest in the Sydney region, it is an understory ground cover in damp areas underneath such trees as Sydney blue gum (Eucalyptus saligna), mountain gum (E. deanei), river peppermint (E. elata) and forest red gum (E. tereticornis). It is also found in rainforest and dry open forest. Doodia aspera can grow as scattered plants or as dense colonies.

== Ecology ==
Tolerant of short dry periods, Doodia aspera can be found in full sun as well as shade. The spores are dispersed by wind.

== Cultivation ==
Readily adaptable to cultivation, Doodia aspera grows in shade or sun with adequate moisture on acidic soils with some organic content. Drainage needs to be sufficient to prevent waterlogging. The pinkish to reddish new growth is an attractive feature. The fern is readily propagated by collecting and germinating the spores, or dividing the rhizomes.
