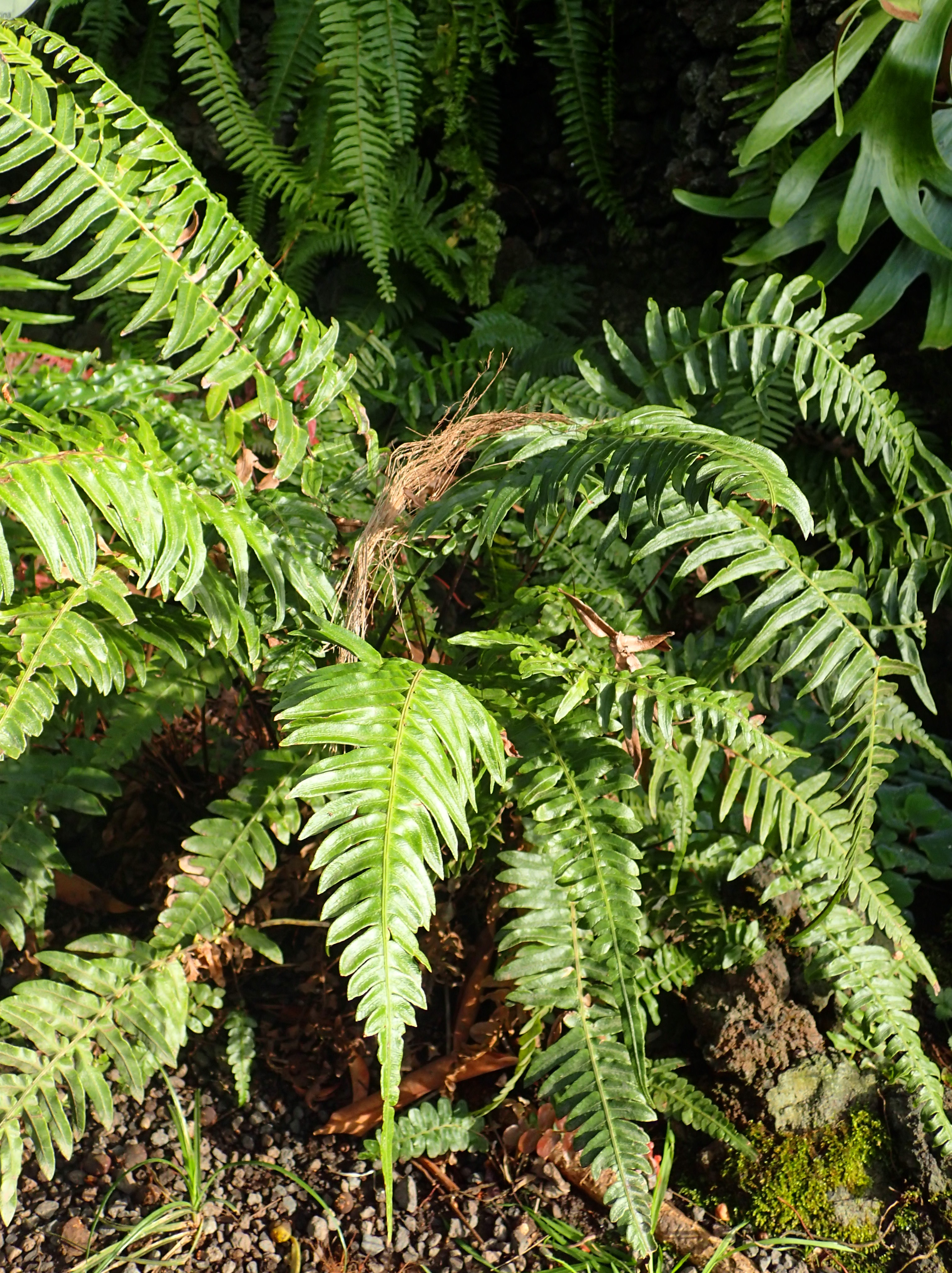
- In cultivation in a botanical garden in Tenerife

Scientific classification
- Kingdom: Plantae
- Clade: Tracheophytes
- Division: Polypodiophyta
- Class: Polypodiopsida
- Order: Polypodiales
- Suborder: Aspleniineae
- Family: Blechnaceae
- Genus: Blechnum
- Species: B. appendiculatum

Binomial name
- Blechnum appendiculatum Willd.

Synonyms
- Blechnum distans var. meridionale (C. Presl) Rosenst.; Blechnum glandulosum Kaulf. ex Link; Blechnum heterocarpum Fée; Blechnum meridionale C.Presl; Blechnum occidentale var. appendiculata (Willd.) Hieron.; Blechnum occidentale var. glandulosum (Link) Proctor; Blechnum occidentale var. intermedium E.Fourn.; Blechnum occidentale var. meridionale (C.Presl) Luetzelb.; Blechnum occidentale var. minor Hook.; Blechnum occidentale var. pectinatum (Hook.) Hook.

= Blechnum appendiculatum =

Species of fern

Blechnum appendiculatum is a fern in the family Blechnaceae. It is commonly known as hammock fern, sinkhole fern, and New World midsorus fern. Its native range is from the southern United States through Mexico, the Caribbean and Central America to western South America. It grows in rocky hammocks and moist forests.
