= Lenbrassia =

Scientific classification
- Kingdom: Plantae
- Clade: Tracheophytes
- Clade: Angiosperms
- Clade: Eudicots
- Clade: Asterids
- Order: Lamiales
- Family: Gesneriaceae
- Genus: Lenbrassia; G.W.Gillett (1974)
- Species: L. australiana

Binomial name
- Lenbrassia australiana (C.T.White) G.W.Gillett (1974)

Synonyms
- Coronanthera australiana C.T.White (1935 publ. 1936); Fieldia australiana (C.T.White) B.L.Burtt (1999); Lenbrassia australiana var. glabrescens B.D.Morley (1978)

Species of trees

Lenbrassia australiana, synonym Fieldia australiana, is a species of flowering plant in the family Gesneriaceae. It is the sole species in genus Lenbrassia. It is a small tree native to the tropical rainforests of north-eastern Queensland, Australia.
