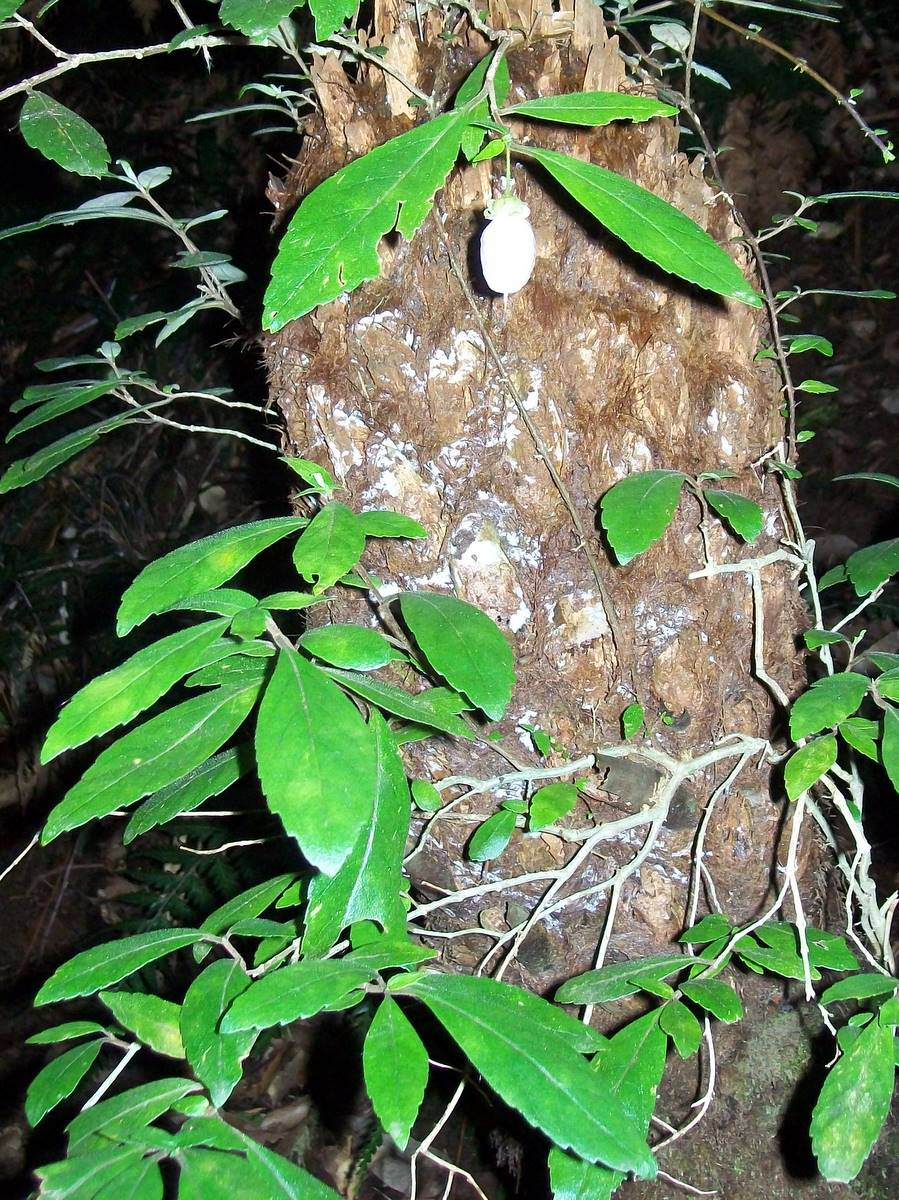
- Fruiting Fieldia growing on a soft tree fern at Mount Wilson, Blue Mountains National Park, Australia

Scientific classification
- Kingdom: Plantae
- Clade: Tracheophytes
- Clade: Angiosperms
- Clade: Eudicots
- Clade: Asterids
- Order: Lamiales
- Family: Gesneriaceae
- Genus: Fieldia; A.Cunn. (1825)
- Species: F. australis

Binomial name
- Fieldia australis A.Cunn. (1825)

Synonyms
- Basileophyta F.Muell. (1853); Basileophyta friderici-augusta F.Muell. (1853)

= Fieldia australis =

Genus of epiphytes

Fieldia australis, usually referred to as fieldia, is a small climbing plant or epiphyte found in the rainforests of eastern Australia, ranging from southeastern Queensland to Victoria. It is the sole species in genus Fieldia. Commonly seen in the cooler rainforests at higher elevations, it also grows in the warmer rainforests with a high humidity. The plant uses adventitious roots to grip hold of tree trunks, mossy rocks or tree ferns.

Leaves are 3 to 7 cm long 1 to 3 cm wide, reverse ovate or elliptical in shape with toothed edges. The leaf stem is around 8 mm long. Flowering occurs mostly in summer or autumn, being an attractive, relatively long thin white flower. The fruit is a whitish berry with some purple markings. Egg-shaped or oblong, 1 to 3 cm long, and around 11 mm in diameter.

== Taxonomy ==
Fieldia australis was originally described and placed in its own genus Fieldia by botanist Allan Cunningham in 1825. The name Fieldia honours Barron Field (1786–1846), judge of the Supreme Court of New South Wales, amateur naturalist and editor of the book Geographical Memoirs on New South Wales in which the genus and species name were first published. A second species, Fieldia australiana, was subsequently described. Plants of the World Online treats F. australiana as Lenbrassia australiana, the sole species in genus Lenbrassia.

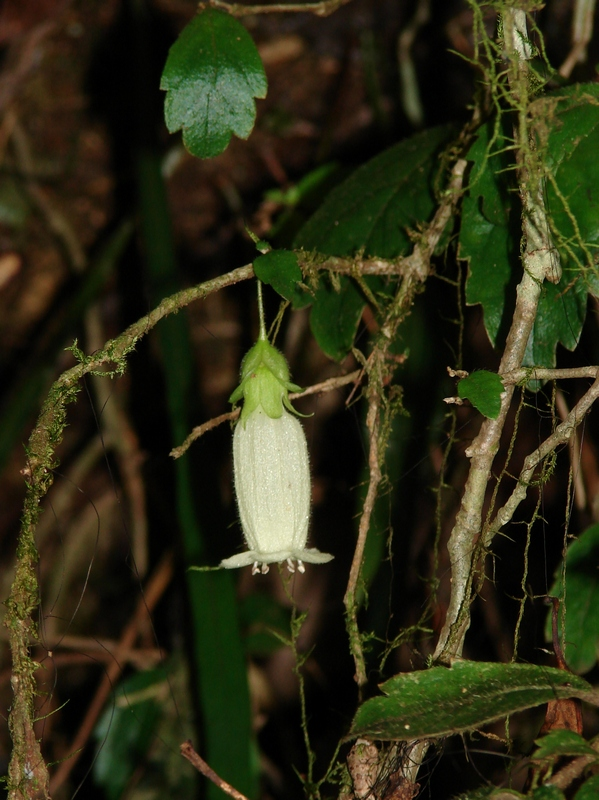
flowering Fieldia at Lamington National Park

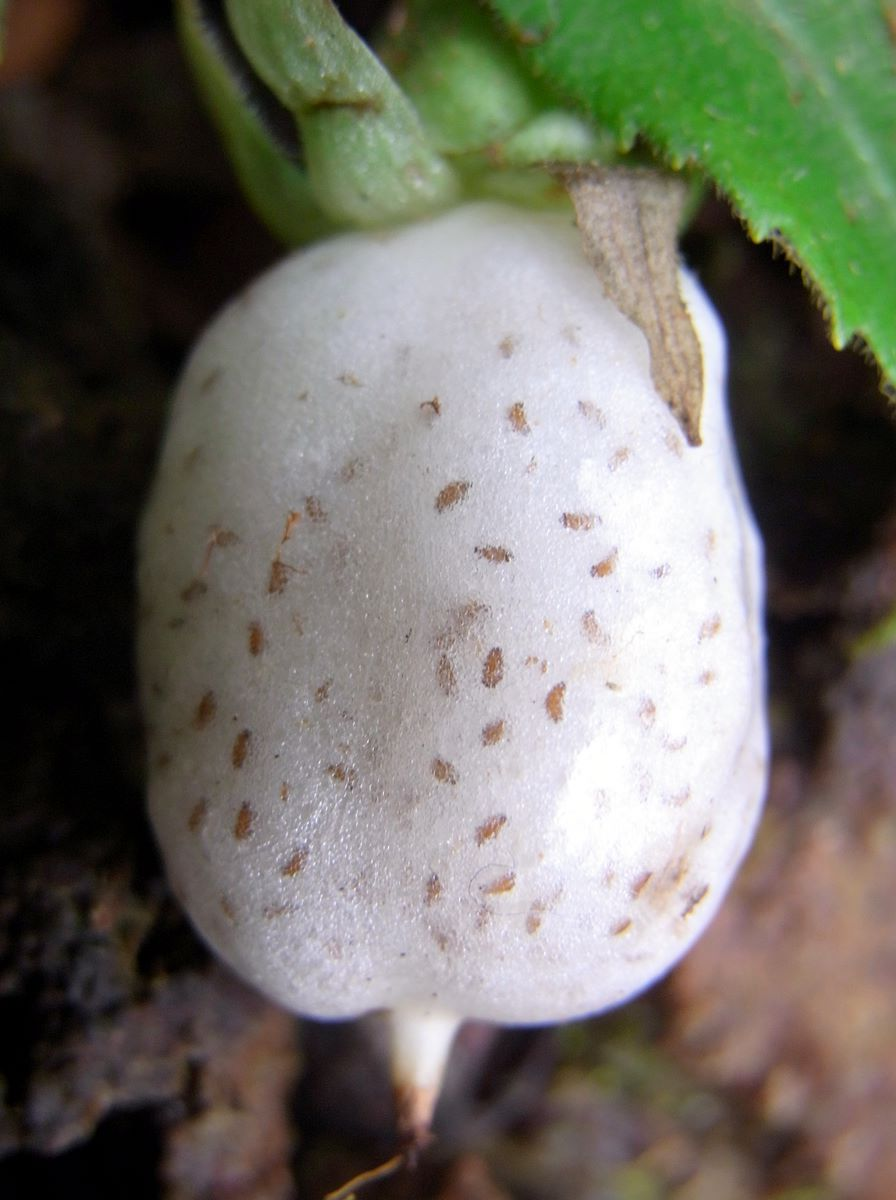
fruiting Fieldia at Mount Imlay National Park
