= Wero (Māori) =

Traditional Māori cultural performance

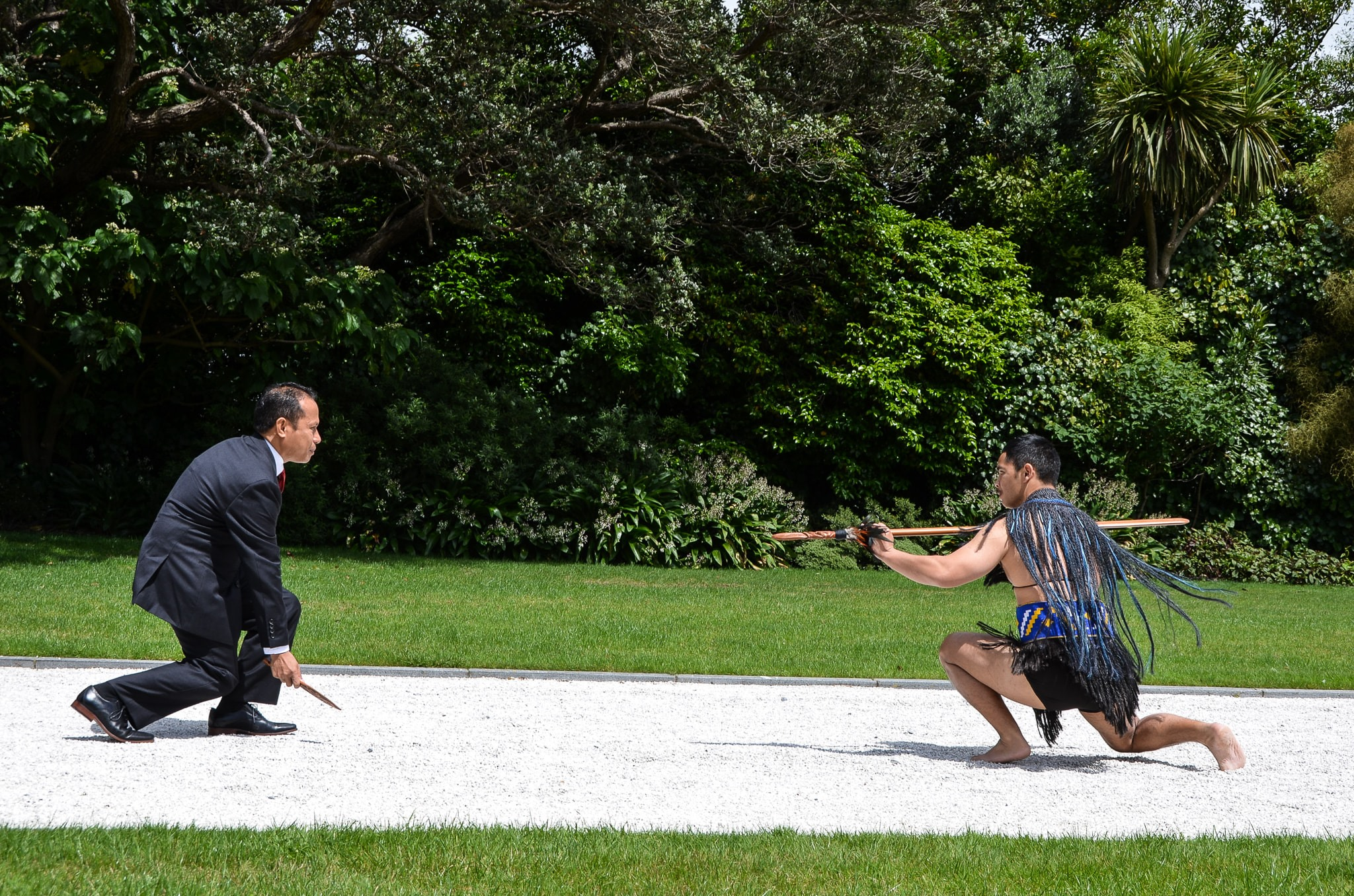
East Timor's ambassador Lisualdo Gaspar (left) was welcomed with a pōwhiri, when presenting his Letters of Credence

Wero (meaning "to cast a spear"), also known as taki, is a traditional Māori challenge, performed as part of the Māori protocol. Its purpose is to ensure that visitors come in peace. It also establishes their steadfastness, and the prowess of the challenging warriors.
