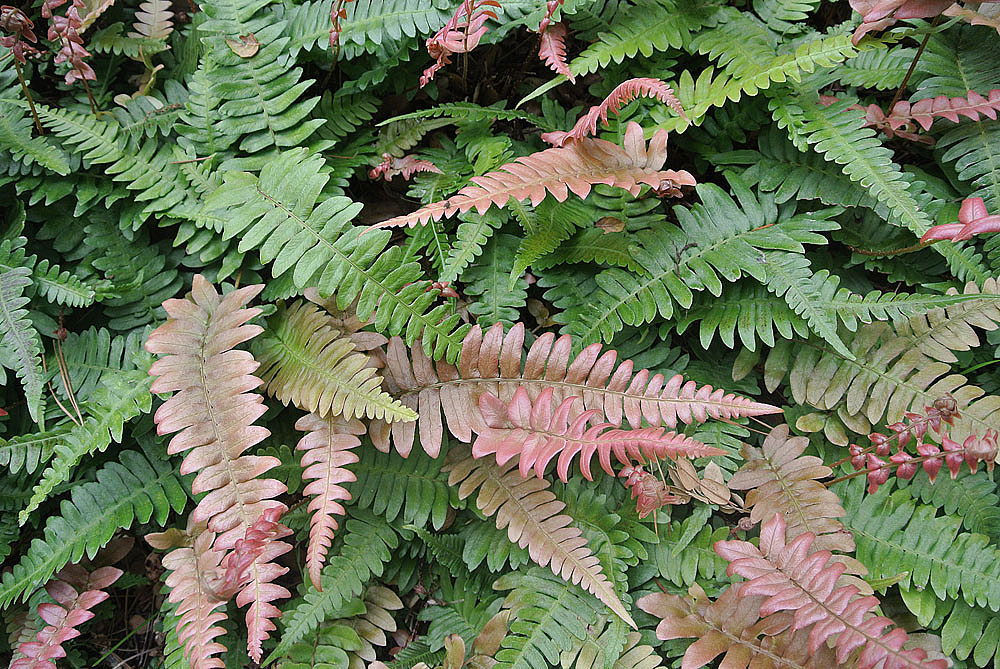
- Blechnum occidentale in cultivation at Lotusland, Montecito, California

Scientific classification
- Kingdom: Plantae
- Clade: Embryophytes
- Clade: Tracheophytes
- Division: Polypodiophyta
- Class: Polypodiopsida
- Order: Polypodiales
- Suborder: Aspleniineae
- Family: Blechnaceae
- Subfamily: Blechnoideae
- Genus: Blechnum; L.

Type species
- Blechnum occidentale L.

Species
- See text.

= Blechnum =

Genus of ferns

Blechnum, known as hard fern, is a genus of ferns in the family Blechnaceae, subfamily Blechnoideae, according to the Pteridophyte Phylogeny Group classification of 2016 (PPG I). Two very different circumscriptions of the genus are used by different authors. In the PPG I system, based on Gasper et al. (2016), Blechnum is one of 18 genera in the subfamily Blechnoideae, and has about 30 species. Other sources use a very broadly defined Blechnum s.l., including accepting only two other genera in the subfamily. The genus then has about 250 species. In the PPG I circumscription, the genus is mostly neotropical, with a few southern African species.

== Description ==
Plants in the genus Blechnum (as circumscribed in the PPG I classification) are mainly terrestrial or grow on rocks; few are epiphytes. Their rhizomes may be upright or creeping and have scales with entire margins or at most a few very small teeth. They generally form stolons, which is a characteristic of the genus. The sterile and fertile fronds are usually of the same form or at most slightly different. The blades of the fronds are of one colour and are usually pinnatisect or unipinnate, rarely entire. The leaf veins are usually free, dividing one to three times, each ending near the frond margin in an enlarged tip. The sori have indusia (scale-like coverings).

== Species ==
Using the PPG I circumscription, as of July 2025, the Checklist of Ferns and Lycophytes of the World accepted the following twenty-three species and five hybrids.

- Blechnum appendiculatum Willd.
- Blechnum arcuatum J.Rémy ex Fée
- Blechnum areolatum V.A.O.Dittrich & Salino
- Blechnum asplenioides Sw.
- Blechnum auriculatum Cav.
- Blechnum australe L.
- Blechnum austrobrasilianum de la Sota
- Blechnum gracile Kaulf.
- Blechnum gracilipes (Rosenst.) M.Kessler & A.R.Sm.
- Blechnum guayanense A.Rojas
- Blechnum hastatum Kaulf.
- Blechnum heringeri Brade
- Blechnum laevigatum Cav.
- Blechnum lanceola Sw.
- Blechnum longipilosum V.A.O.Dittrich & Salino
- Blechnum ludificans Herter
- Blechnum malacothrix Maxon & Morton
- Blechnum meridense Klotzsch
- Blechnum occidentale L.
- Blechnum polypodioides Raddi
- Blechnum punctulatum Sw.
- Blechnum rivulorum V.A.O.Dittrich & Salino
- Blechnum tomentosum M.Kessler & A.R.Sm.

=== Hybrids ===
- Blechnum × caudatum Cav.
- Blechnum × confluens Schltdl. & Cham.
- Blechnum × falciculatum C.Presl
- Blechnum × leopoldense (Dutra) V.A.O.Dittrich & Salino
- Blechnum × pampasicum de la Sota & M.L.Durán
