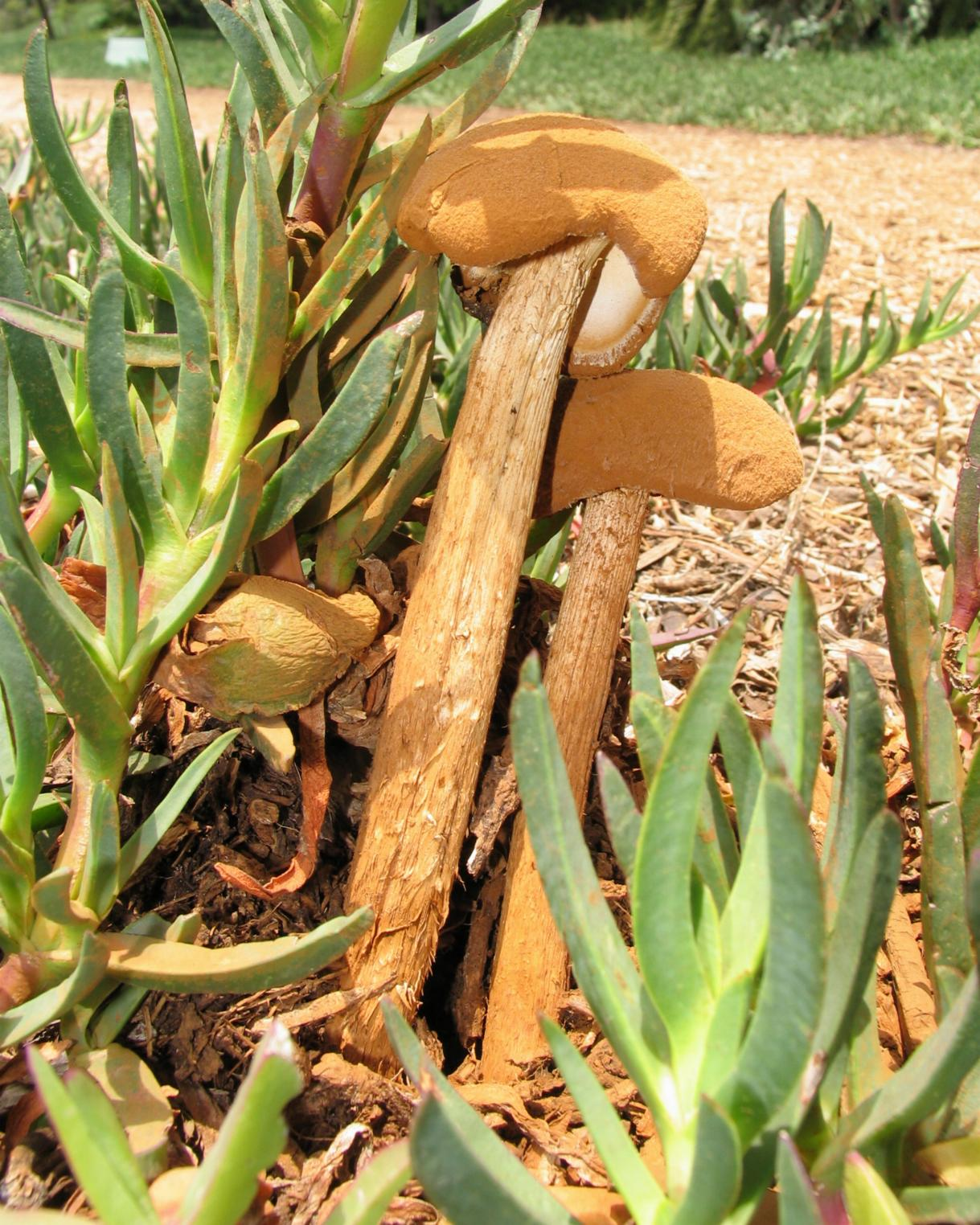

Scientific classification
- Kingdom: Fungi
- Division: Basidiomycota
- Class: Agaricomycetes
- Order: Agaricales
- Family: Agaricaceae
- Genus: Battarrea
- Species: B. phalloides

Binomial name
- Battarrea phalloides (Dicks.) Pers. (1801)

Synonyms
- Lycoperdon phalloides Dicks. (1785); Phallus campanulatus Berk. (1842); Ithyphallus campanulatus (Berk.) Schltdl. (1933)

= Battarrea phalloides =

Species of fungus

Battarrea phalloides
- Mycological characteristics
- Glebal hymenium
- Cap is conical
- Hymenium attachment is not applicable
- Stipe has a volva
- Spore print is ochre
- Ecology is saprotrophic
- Edibility is inedible

Battarrea phalloides (Note: Orthographic variations include Batarrea, Battarea, Battarraea, and Battaraea.) is a species of mushroom in the family Agaricaceae, and the type species of the genus Battarrea. Its common names include the scaley-stalked puffball, sandy stiltball, and desert stalked puffball. The European B. stevenii is a potential synonym.

B. phalloides has a woody, slender, and shaggy or scaly stem that is typically up to 40 centimeters (15.7 in) in length. Although its general appearance resembles an agaric with stem and gills, atop the stem is a spore sac, consisting of a peridium and a powdery internal gleba. In maturity, the spore sac ruptures to release the spores. The species is found in dry, sandy locations throughout the world, and has been collected from Africa, Eurasia, Australia, and the Americas. It is inedible.

== Taxonomy ==
The species was first mentioned in the scientific literature in 1784, when Thomas Jenkinson Woodward described a new species found by Mr. Humphreys of Norwich. It was named by James Dickson in 1785 as Lycoperdon phalloides, and the type locality was Suffolk, England. Christian Hendrik Persoon sanctioned the name when he transferred to Battarrea in his 1801 Synopsis Methodica Fungorum, a newly circumscribed genus named after the Italian mycologist Giovanni Antonio Battarra. Synonyms include Phallus campanulatus, published by Miles Berkeley in 1842 based on collections made by Charles Darwin in Maldonado (Uruguay) in 1833, and Ithyphallus campanulatus, a new combination based on Berkeley's name, published by Diederich Franz Leonhard von Schlechtendal in 1933.

Historically, there has been uncertainty as to whether the European species known as Battarrea stevenii is a unique species or merely a polymorphic variant of B. phalloides. The taxon has been described as both a variety (as B. phalloides var. stevenii by Cleland and Cheel in 1916) and as a form (as B. phalloides f. stevenii by Calonge in 2004). In 1995, mycologist Roy Watling opined that B. stevenii differs in having spores that are colored more orange-tawny, slightly larger (5–6.5 by 5.75–7 μm, as opposed to 4.5–5.25 by 4.5–5.75 μm), and less ornamented. Further, B. stevenii is thought to have a larger fruit body size, a more coarsely scaly stipe, and lack of mucilage in the volva and the innermost parts of the stem. The presence or absence of mucilage has been traditionally considered the significant characteristic separating the species.

In 1904, Lászlo Hollós proposed the idea of a single polymorphic species; in 1942, Paul Marshall Rea, after studying 25 specimens from southern California, concluded that B. stevenii was conspecific with B. phalloides and represented a single species. An analysis of a number of European specimens—using both macroscopic and microscopic characteristics in addition to molecular analysis of ITS regions of the 5.8S rDNA—also suggested both to be conspecific. The authors of this study considered the differences in spore ornamentation and stipe hyphae to be insufficient to discriminate them as two species; they did, however, note that their inability to locate the type material for both species limited the conclusiveness of their suggestion.

The conspecificity of the species was supported in a later study using traditional and molecular methods to compare field-collected English specimens and an extensive range of herbarium material collected from around the world. They found that material labeled B. stevenii generally had a greater range of cap and stem sizes, while that labeled B. phalloides was generally more consistent, and smaller. However, the B. phalloides material studied was generally from similar habitats in the UK, while the B. stevenii material originated from a wide variety of locales and habitats, suggesting that environmental factors influence fruit body morphology. Evidence pointing to conspecificity included the continuum of spore sizes between the two and the lack of any significant differences between their DNA. In 2006, however, based on a study of specimens collected in China, other scientists considered them to be independent species.

=== Etymology ===
The specific epithet phalloides means phallus-like, and refers to the similarity of the volva to the genus Phallus. Battarrea phalloides is commonly known as the "scaly-stalked puffball" and the "sandy stiltball"; a common name given to the species B. stevenii is the "desert drumstick". In Cyprus, it is known locally as "Donkey fungus", a name that may be derived from the fact that the spores were once used as a natural antiseptic and antipruritic agent applied to the backs of donkeys, or for their morphological resemblance to the animal's penis.

== Description ==
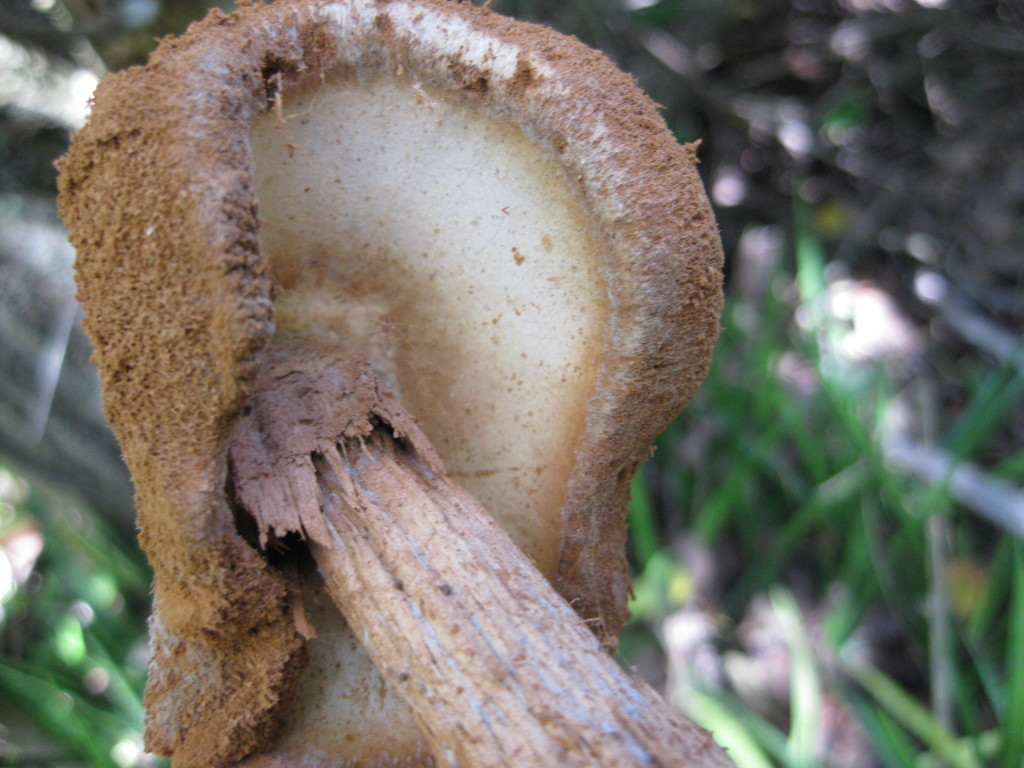
Underside of spore-bearing surface

Mature specimens of Battarrea phalloides roughly resemble the typical agaric mushroom stature of stem and cap. However, rather than a cap with gills, this species has a spore sac atop the stem. When young, the fruit body is roughly spherical and completely encased in an outer wall (exoperidium) that later splits in a circumscissile fashion (along a circular or equatorial line), the lower wall forming a volva and the upper part forming scales that cover the inner wall. The upper part rolls upward and backward and eventually falls away in one piece, exposing a spore sac lined with a narrow ring of capillitium and spores. The spores are sticky. As these are carried away by the wind, the drying action of the latter cause the edges of the peridium to shrivel and roll up more, exposing more spores. This is continued until the upper half of the peridium has shriveled and blown away and there remains only a few spores, which may be washed away by rain.

The fruit body develops rapidly; when mature, it is rust-colored, with a hemispherical to somewhat conical "head" 1 to 3 cm (0.4 to 1.2 in) in diameter, and with a stalk up to 40 cm (15.7 in) long by 0.4 to 1.5 cm (0.2 to 0.6 in) thick.

One study reported a specimen found in Mexico with a length of 70 cm (27.6 in). Typically, the spore case is 3 to 5 cm (1.2 to 2.0 in) broad by 1 to 3.5 cm (0.4 to 1.4 in) tall. The hollow stalk is pale brown to brown, woody, and has a fibrous, scaly, or even woolly surface. The mature gleba, which is eventually exposed when the peridial cap is shed, has a rust-brown color. The cap may persist after the spore mass is dispersed and form a disc-like unit that slides down the stalk like a ring. The fragile sac-shaped volva is up to 15 by 13 cm (5.9 by 5.1 in) broad, unattached to the stalk, and formed by two distinct, separated tissue layers. The inner layer resembles the scales of the stem, consisting of hyphae that are 3–18 μm in diameter, closely arranged (nearly parallel), septate, sparsely branched, yellowish ochre, with clamps at some septa. The outer layer of fungal tissue is thicker, membranous, sometimes with a corky texture when dry, and dirty white. It consists of pale yellow intertwined hyphae that are difficult to distinguish individually, and without remains of a gelatinous matrix. Fruit bodies may persist for several months after they have dried.

The thick-walled spores are roughly spherical, rusty-brown, finely and densely warted, and have diameters of 5–6.5 μm. Elaters are 50–80 by 4–6 μm, and have ring-like or spiral thickenings. The endoperidium consists of densely interwoven hyphae that are 3–9 μm in diameter and walls less than 1 μm thick; they are septate, branched, pale yellow, with clamp connections.

The gleba is largely made up of two types of threads. The pseudocapillitium has hyphae up to 5 μm diameter, mostly thin walled, smooth, septate, sparsely branched, hyaline to pale yellow, with clamps. The elaters have diameters of 3.5–7 μm and are 32–70 μm long; they are pale yellow, smooth-walled, tapered and cylindrical with spiral thickenings. Glebal elaters are aseptate and not branched.

=== Similar species ===
The closely related species Battarrea diguettii is known in the United States from the Mojave Desert, and differs from B. phalloides in that the spore sac emerges by ripping through the top of the exoperidium, rather than by circumscissile rupture. The endoperidium of B. diguettii is also smaller, and the spores emerge through a number of pores on the upper surface of the spore sac. Battarrea stevenii can grow taller, up to 70 centimeters (27.6 in). Podaxis pistillaris, commonly known as the "desert shaggy mane", occurs in dry locales similar to B. phalloides, but can be distinguished by its shaggy, elongated cap.

== Habitat and distribution ==
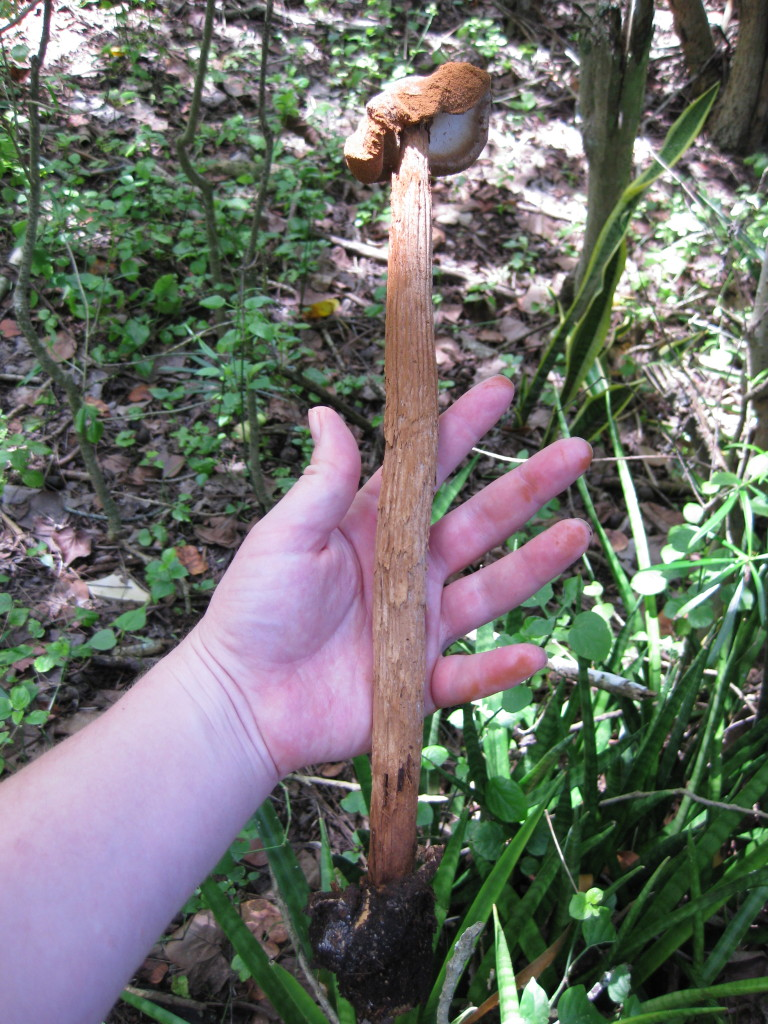
Specimen from Oahu, Hawaii

Battarrea phalloides may be found growing solitary to scattered on dry, sandy hedgebanks (raised or mounded boundary feature, often topped by a hedgerow), sometimes growing amongst elm suckers. It is a relatively rare species, but may be locally abundant in some locations. In Mexico, where it is only known from the north and central part of the country, it has been usually collected in arid and semiarid areas, on coastal dunes, found from sea level up to 2,550 m (8,370 ft) high. The mushroom has been associated with the quick-growing evergreen tree Schinus molle, as well as Lycium brevipes, Solanum hindsianum, Salicornia subterminalis, Atriplex linearis, Quercus agrifolia and Opuntia species, in coastal dunes. The largest fruit bodies were found on floodplains with halophilic (i.e., thriving in high-salt conditions) vegetation. In Belgium, specimens were found on sandy soil under dead elderflower bushes.

In North America, B. phalloides has been collected from the Yukon Territory, western Canada; the US, where it is confined to the west— Southern California, New Mexico, and Arizona— Mexico, and Hawaii. It has also been reported growing in South America (Brazil), Africa (Morocco), Europe (Belgium and North Macedonia), China, Australia, and Aotearoa New Zealand. Due to a decline in sightings, B. phalloides was granted legal protection in Hungary in 2005, making it a finable offense to pick them. It received similar protected status in the United Kingdom in 1998.

The habitat and range of B. stevenii include arid regions of the western and southwestern United States, Australia, Aotearoa New Zealand, South Africa, and several European countries, including Russia.

== Edibility ==
Battarrea phalloides (as well as B. stevenii) is inedible. In Cyprus, the immature egg-form of the fruit body is eaten. Older specimens may smell unpleasant. The spores of B. stevenii are used as a cicatrizant—a product that promotes healing through the formation of scar tissue–by the Criollo herdsmen of Gran Chaco in northern Argentina.

== Notes and references ==
Notes
