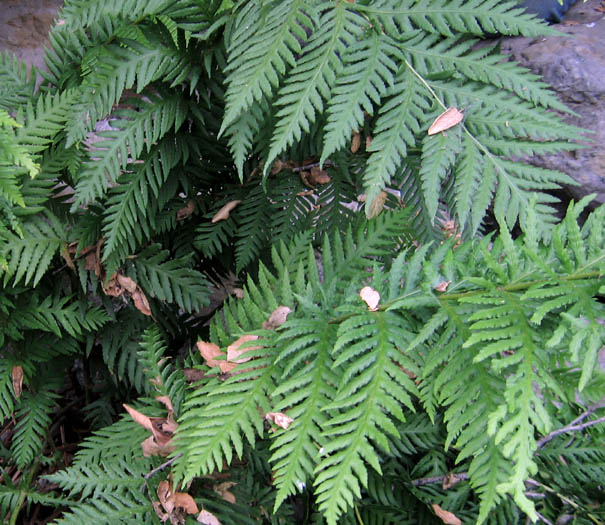

Conservation status
- Secure (NatureServe)

Scientific classification
- Kingdom: Plantae
- Clade: Embryophytes
- Clade: Tracheophytes
- Division: Polypodiophyta
- Class: Polypodiopsida
- Order: Polypodiales
- Suborder: Aspleniineae
- Family: Blechnaceae
- Genus: Woodwardia
- Species: W. fimbriata

Binomial name
- Woodwardia fimbriata Sm.

= Woodwardia fimbriata =

Species of fern

Woodwardia fimbriata, known by the common name giant chain fern, is an evergreen perennial fern species in the family Blechnaceae, in the eupolypods II clade of the order Polypodiales, in the class Polypodiopsida. It is native to western North America from British Columbia through California, including the Sierra Nevada, into Baja California.

It grows in coniferous forests and other moist wooded habitat.

It was first described by James Edward Smith and is characterized by its large fronds and arrangement of reproductive sori.

Not only is it used in gardens, but it also has a history of use by the native tribes in the United States, such as the native tribes of California.

== Description ==
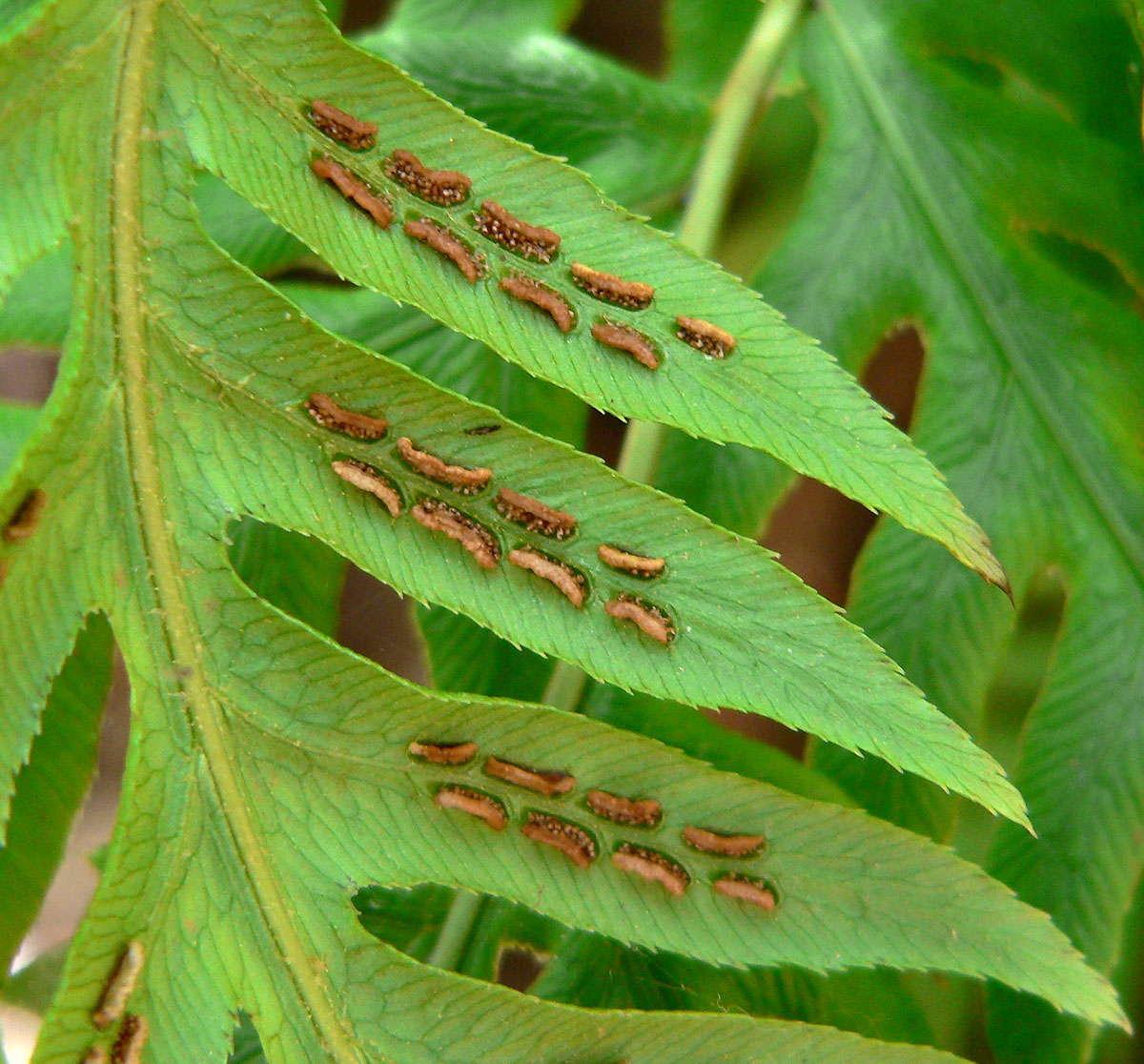
The chain-like arrangement of Sori on Woodwardia fimbriata

Woodwardia fimbriata has very long fronds, each reaching 1 to 3 meters in length. Its sori are short but broad and are arranged in neat lines, the characteristic that gives the chain ferns their name. The chain shape is visible on both sides of each leaflet.

The fronds are bipinnately compound, the leaves have the same general shape and leathery texture.

Parts of the rhizome exist above and below ground. The above ground portion is covered with petioles, reddish-brown or orange-brown scales cover the bases of these petioles. The petioles can also be straw colored or have a reddish-brown color at their bases and can be between 15 and 100 cm in length.

== Taxonomy ==
Woodwardia fimbriata was first described by James Edward Smith. It was first published in The Cyclopaedia in the year 1818. The term "Woodwardia" is a reference to the English botanist Thomas Jenkinson Woodward.

Common names include the giant chain fern and the western chain fern.

Synonyms include: Woodwardia chamissoi, Woodwardia paradoxa, Woodwardia biserrata and Woodwardia spinulosa.

== Distribution and habitat ==
Woodwardia fimbriata can be located along the western coast of North America from British Columbia in Canada to Baja California as well as the state of Nevada.

Records of Woodwardia fimbriata indicate its presence in canyons, foothills, springs, streambeds and banks and in different kinds of forests such as redwood, coniferous and mixed forests.

It grows mainly in moist and wet environments, with elevations between 0–1000 meters, but records note instances at elevations up to 8000 feet (2438 meters).

== Ecology ==
Natural threats to Woodwardia fimbriata include soil erosion and competition for natural resources by invasive species.

It is found near trees such as red alder (Alnus rubra), and western hemlock (Tsuga heterophylla), or near other ferns such as the sword and maidenhair ferns.

== Uses ==
=== Cultivation ===
Woodwardia fimbriata is cultivated as an ornamental plant for traditional and native plant gardens, and in natural landscaping and habitat restoration projects. It is a recipient of the Royal Horticultural Society's Award of Garden Merit.

When grown in cultivation, it should be placed in partially shaded and moist environment and with acidic or neutral soil, but it can also be grown in full sun with proper watering.

There are no notable pests or diseases that specifically affect it in cultivation.

=== Uses by Native Americans ===
The indigenous tribes of California used fibers obtained from Woodwardia fimbriata to add patterns into their baskets. Fibers were obtained from the stems and dyed red using an extract from white alder before being added into baskets.

Methods for obtaining fibers involved using the leaves, more specifically fiber was obtained from crushing the rachis of leaves and processing them. Dyes were obtained from both white alder and red alder barks.

There are also records of medical use of this plant for pain relief, specifically by Luiseno Indians who used extractions from the roots.

The leaves were also placed in the ovens of the Pomo and Kashaya tribes before cooking.

== Gallery ==
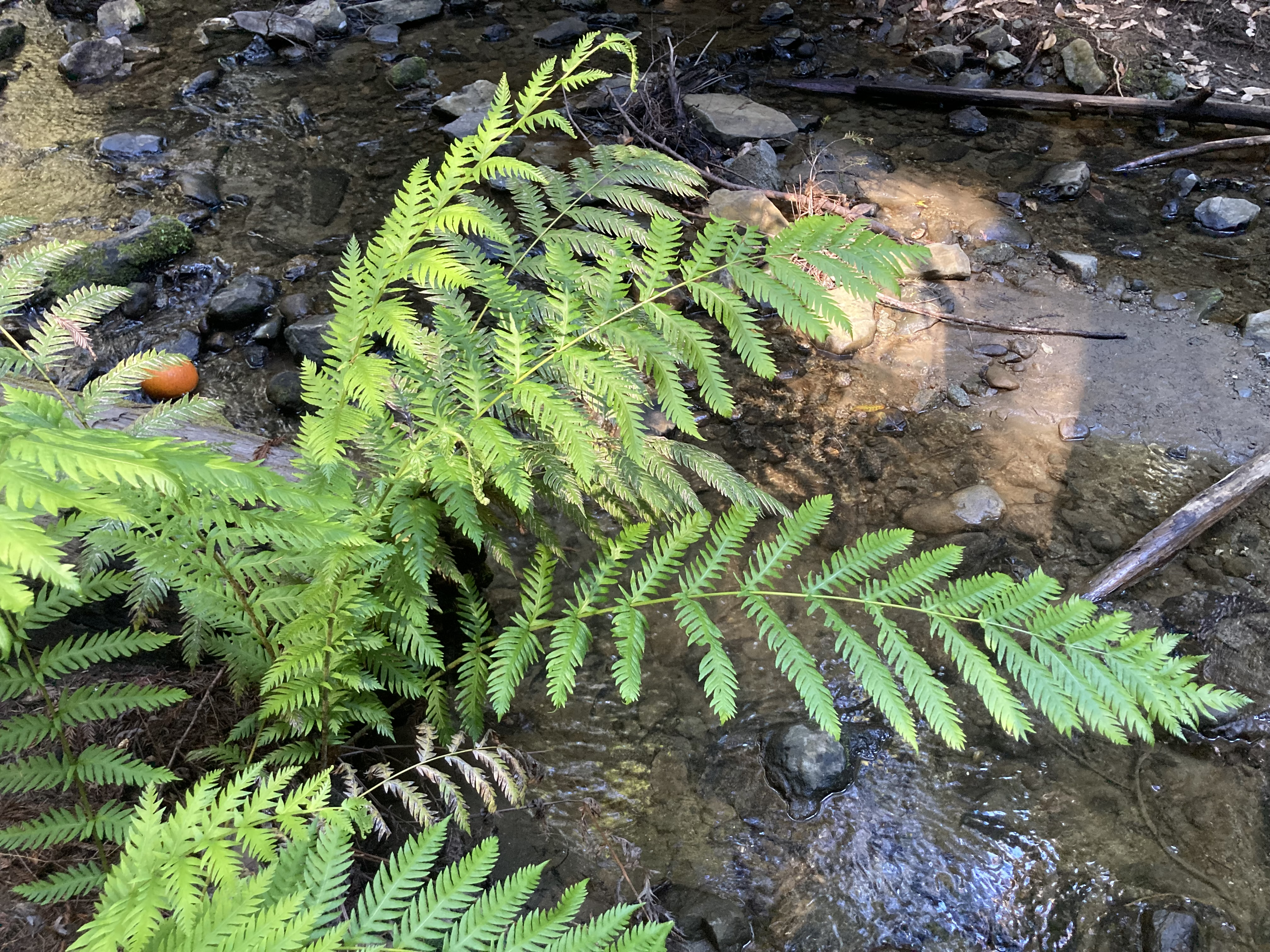
At the Forest of Nisene Marks.

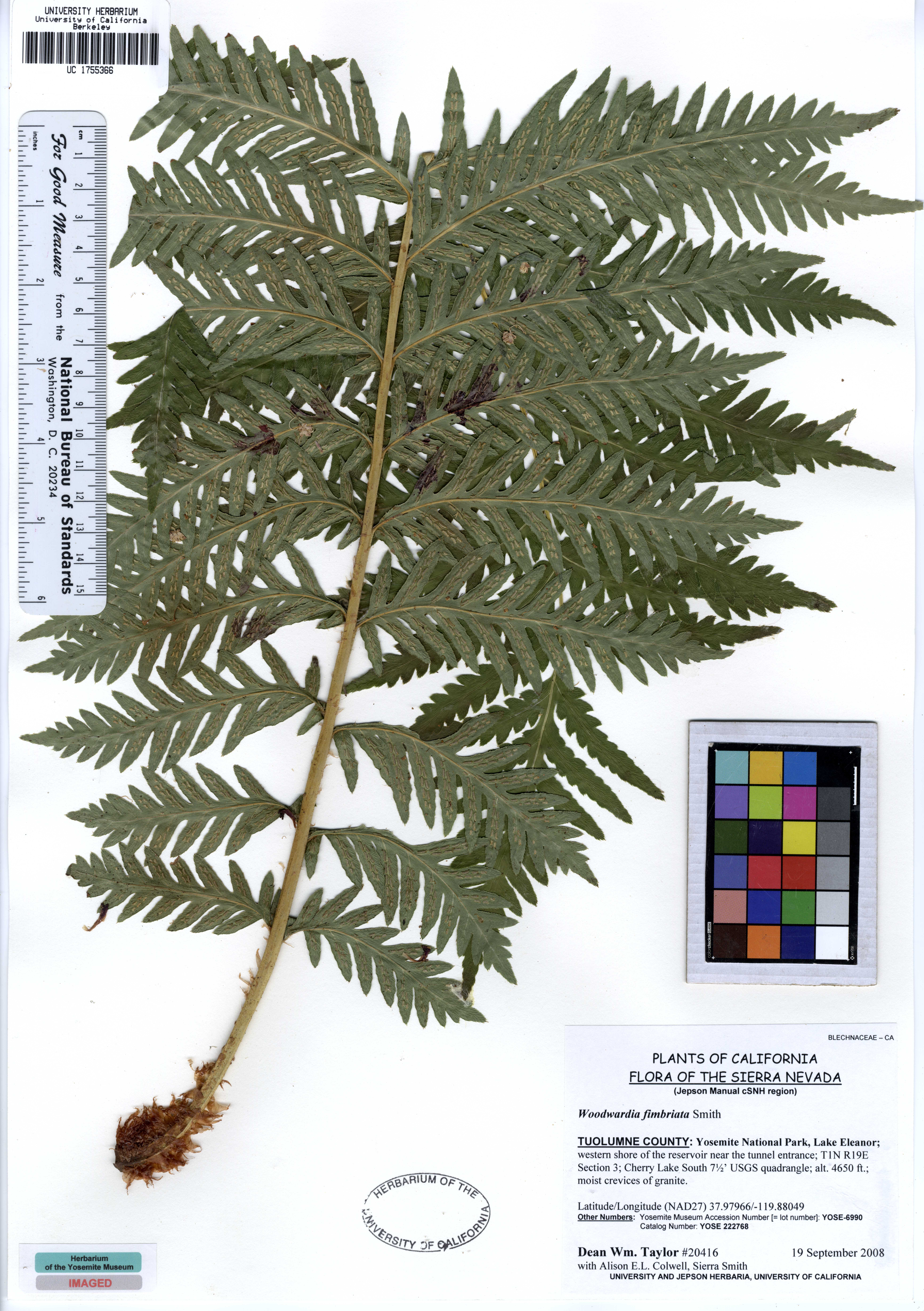
Leaf specimen

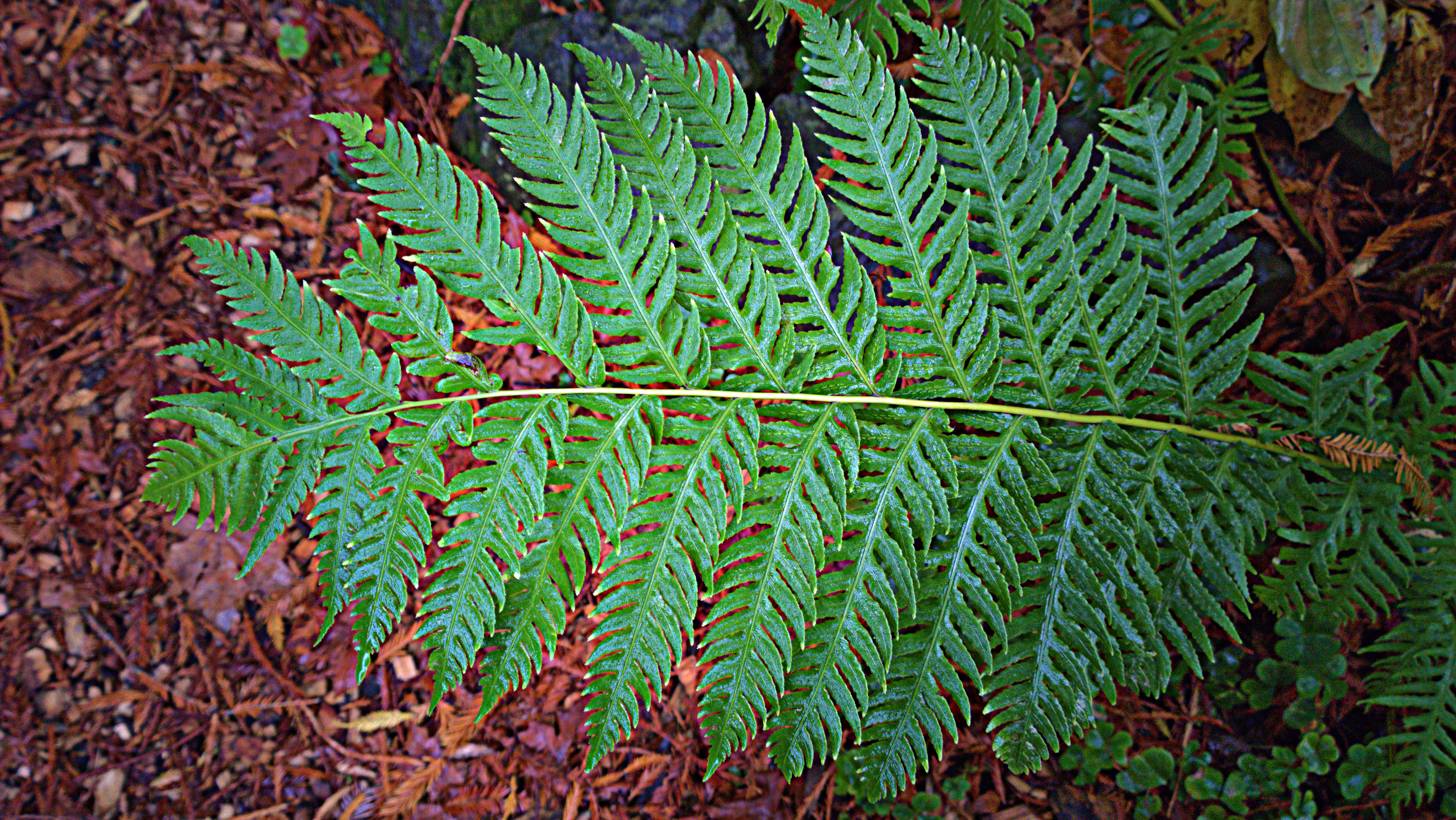
Single frond

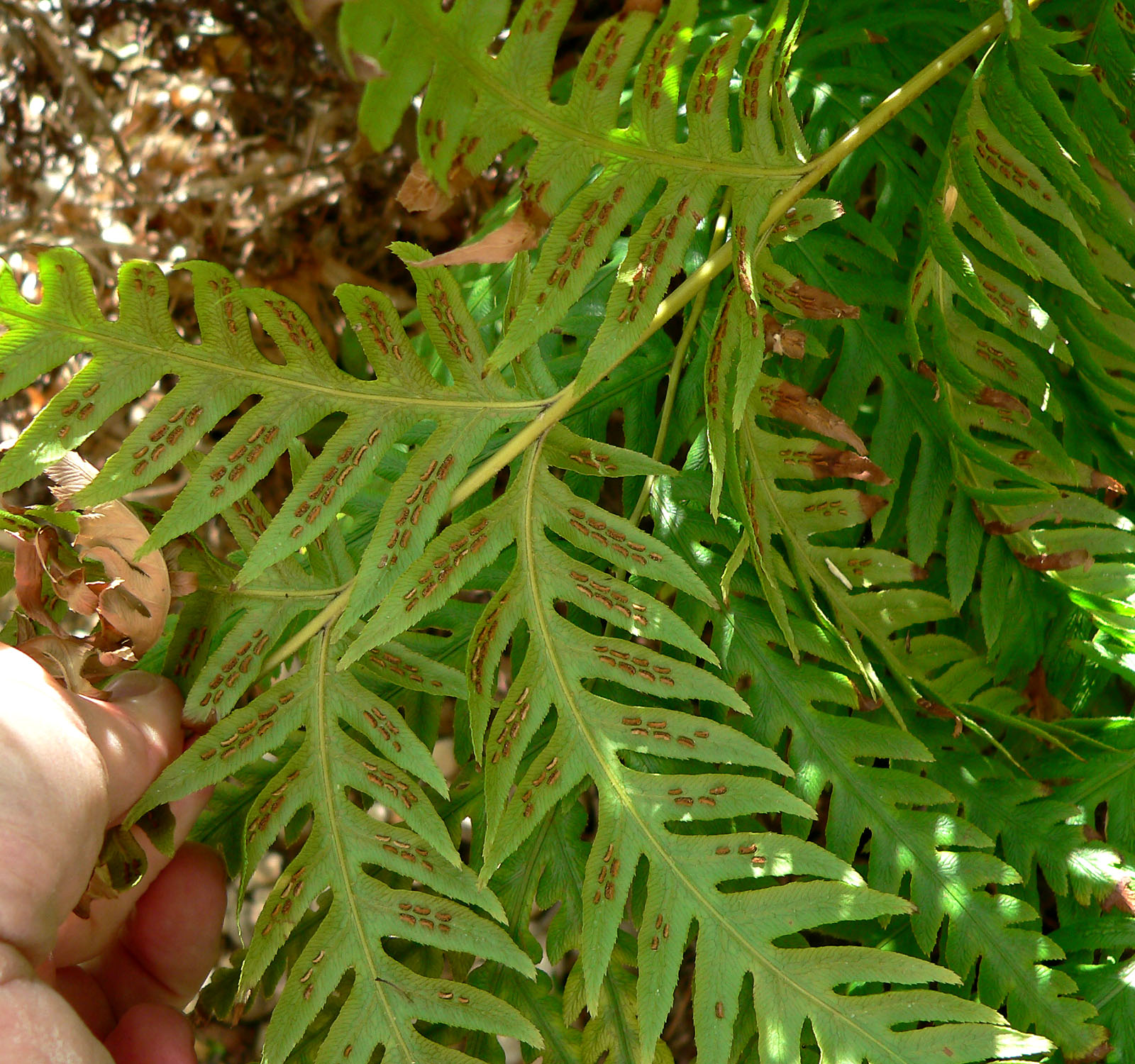
Spores

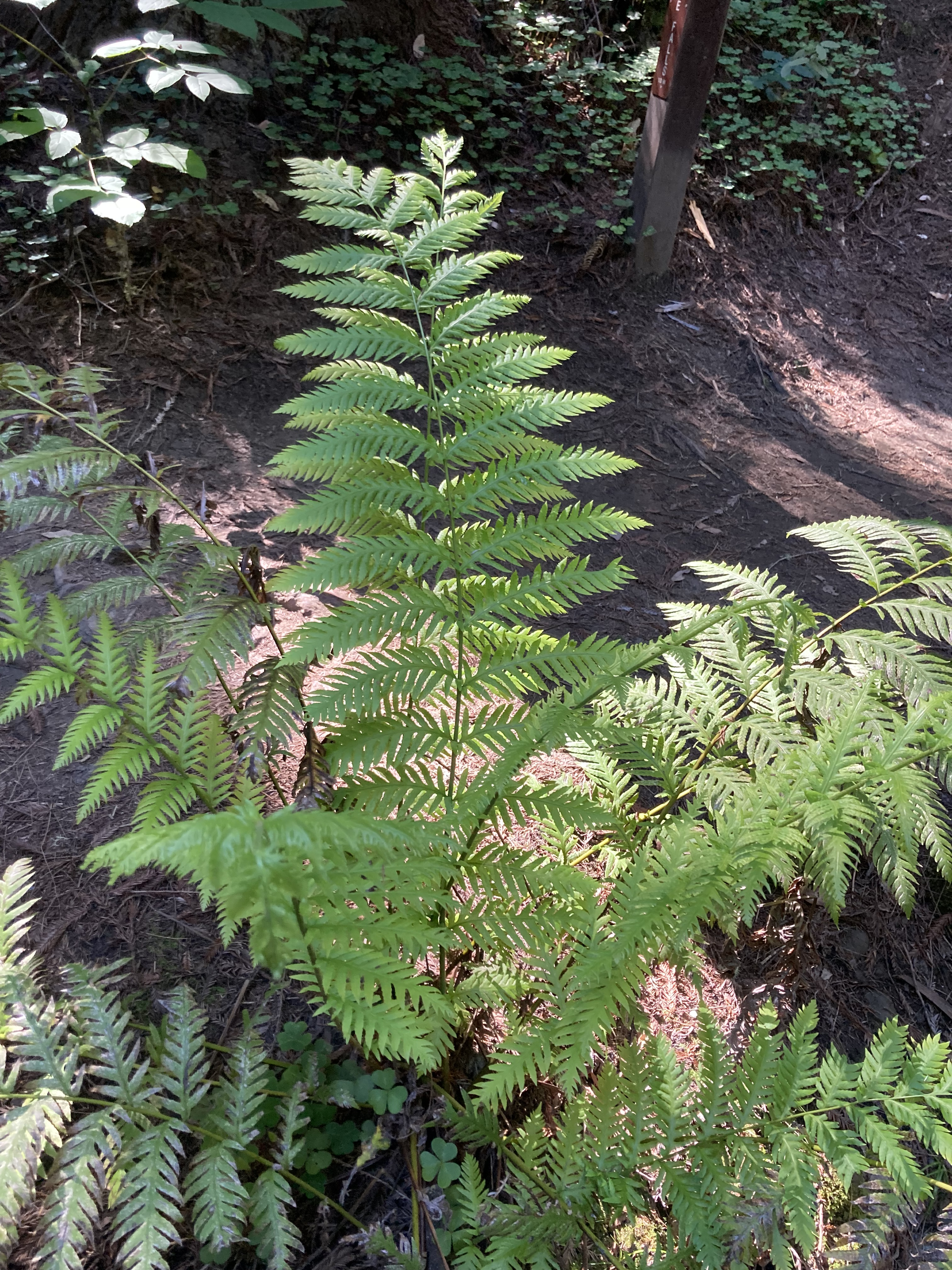
In a Redwood forest.
