= Giovanni Antonio Battarra =

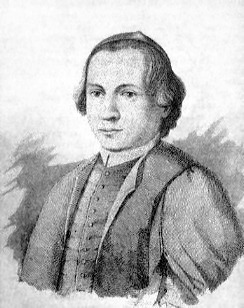
Giovanni Battarra portrait

Giovanni Antonio Battarra (Coriano, 9 June 1714 – Rimini, 8 November 1789) was an Italian priest, naturalist, and mycologist. In 1755, he published Fungorum Agri Ariminensis Historia, consisting of 80 pages and illustrated with 40 copper plates drawn and engraved by himself, in which he described 248 species of fungi.

He visited and consulted with the Abbot Bruno Tozzi, a celebrated amateur botanist in Florence.

== Eponyms of Giovanni Antonio Battarra ==
=== Eponymous genera ===
- Battarrea Pers. (1801)

=== Eponymous subgenera ===
- Hypocrea subgen. Battarrina Sacc., 1883

=== Eponymous species ===
- Amanitopsis battarrae Boud., 1902 (now Amanita battarrae)
- Phoma battarreae
- Pleurotus battarrae Quél., 1879
- Agaricus battarrae Fr., 1821 (now Psathyrella battarrae)

== See also ==
- List of mycologists
