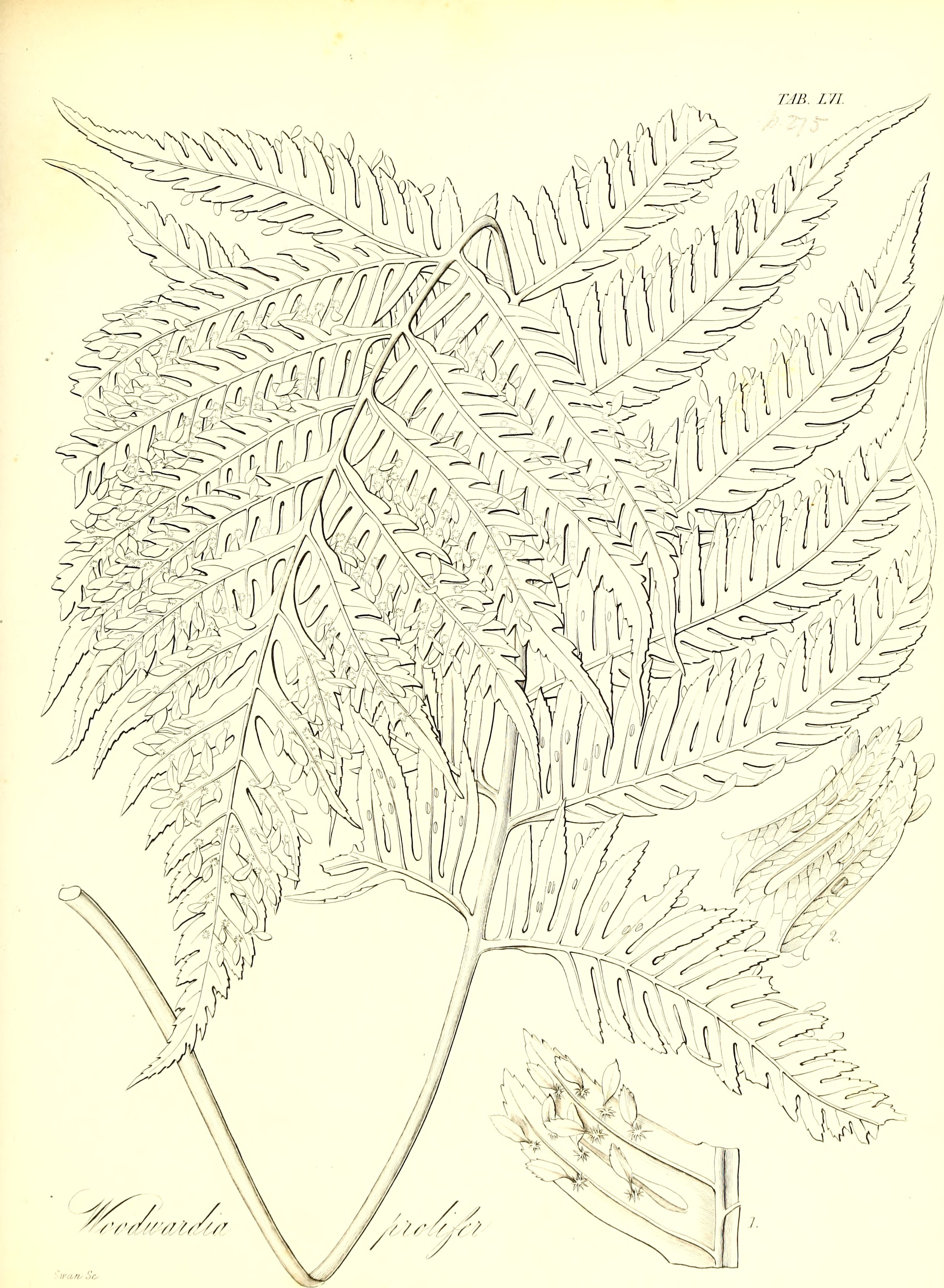

Scientific classification
- Kingdom: Plantae
- Clade: Embryophytes
- Clade: Tracheophytes
- Division: Polypodiophyta
- Class: Polypodiopsida
- Order: Polypodiales
- Suborder: Aspleniineae
- Family: Blechnaceae
- Genus: Woodwardia
- Species: W. prolifera

Binomial name
- Woodwardia prolifera Hook. & Arn. 1838

= Woodwardia prolifera =

Species of plant

Woodwardia prolifera (Chinese: 珠芽狗脊) is a species of fern in the family Blechnaceae found in China, Japan and the Himalayas. It was first described by Sir William Jackson Hooker and George Arnott Walker Arnott in 1838.

== Distribution ==
This species can be found growing around coastal locations, mountain slopes and near streams. They usually occur in wet conditions at elevations between 100 – 1,100m.

== Description ==
Their fronds are between 1.5 – 3m in length and can vary in colour from green to orange. They have pink-orange plantlets. These evergreen plants usually grow in chalky, acidic soil under light shade.

They are also a diploid species. Their spores are between 75 – 78 microns long and their guard cells are between 35 – 51 microns long.

== Taxonomy ==
This species is known by the names W. orientalis var. prolifera or var. formosana. Although its possible to visually distinguish, they are closely related to and are sometimes confused with Woodwardia orientalis.

== Cultivation ==
This species is a popular plant in horticulture. It has gained the Award of Garden Merit from the Royal Horticultural Society.

They can be propagated by pegging down their fronds and then letting the plantlets or bulbils create roots before removing them from the frond. The bulbils or plantlets can also be planted separately although high humidity is required. They can also be easily propagated with spores.

== Chemistry ==
Three different lignans, blechnic acid, 7-epiblechnic acid, and brainic acid are known to be present in Woodwardia prolifera.

== See also ==
- Woodwardia unigemmata – another closely related species
- Flora of Japan
- Plant propagation
