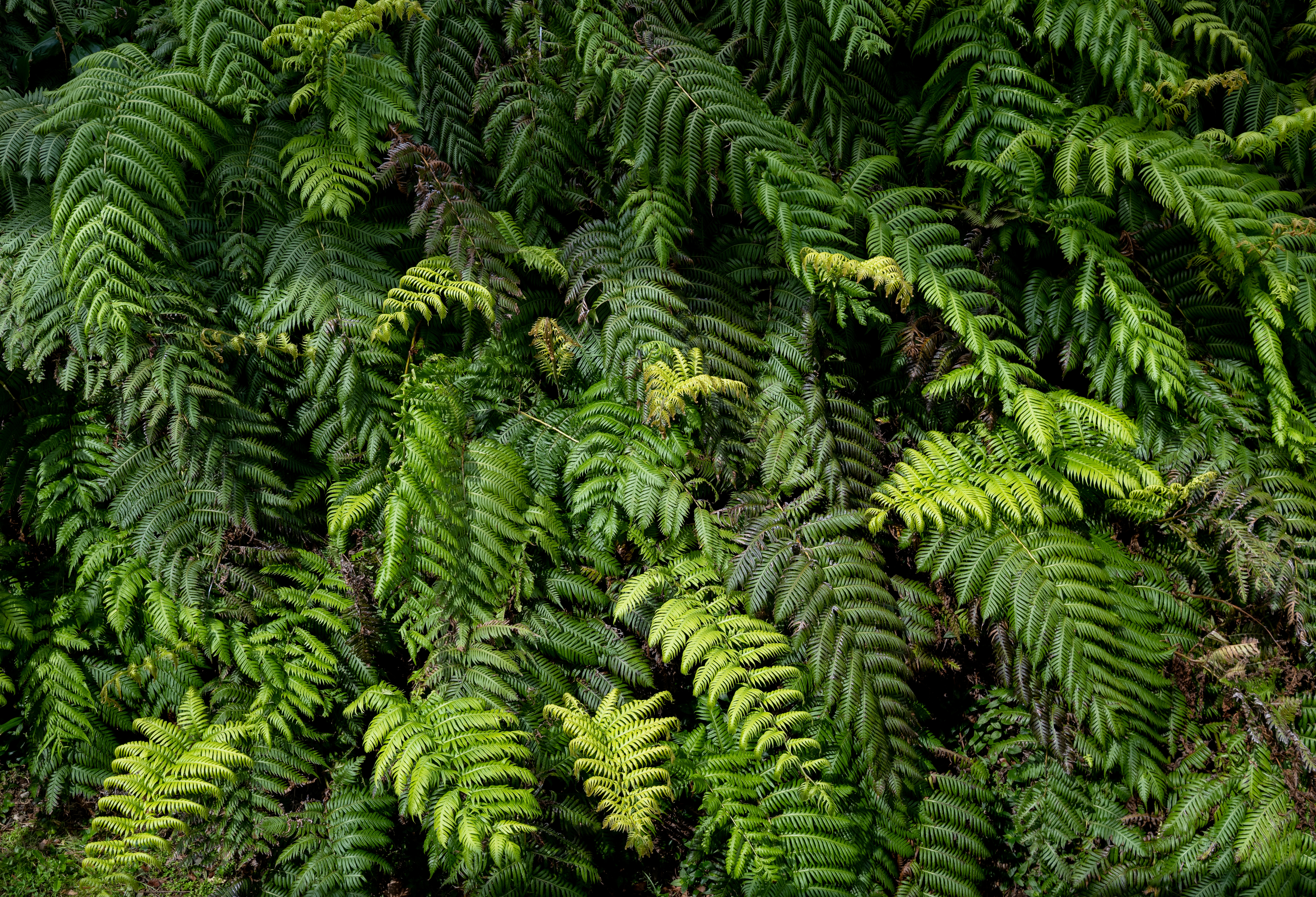
- W. radicans, Graciosa
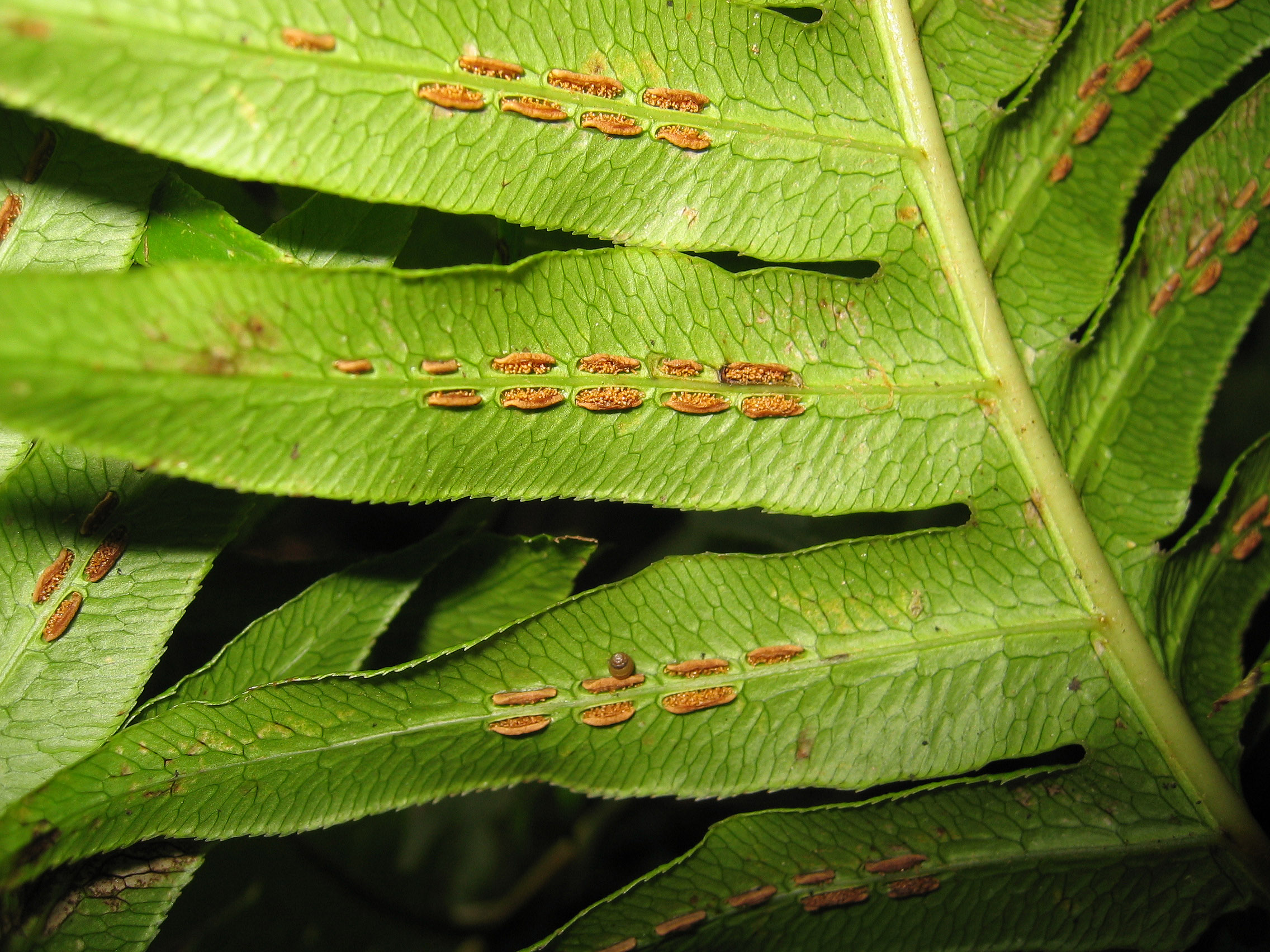
- Close-up of sori

Conservation status
- Vulnerable (IUCN 3.1)

Scientific classification
- Kingdom: Plantae
- Clade: Tracheophytes
- Division: Polypodiophyta
- Class: Polypodiopsida
- Order: Polypodiales
- Suborder: Aspleniineae
- Family: Blechnaceae
- Genus: Woodwardia
- Species: W. radicans

Binomial name
- Woodwardia radicans (L.) Sm.

Synonyms
- Blechnum houttuynii Poir.; Blechnum radicans L.; Blechnum stans (Cav. ex Sm.) Poir.; Woodwardia stans Cav. ex Sm.

= Woodwardia radicans =

Species of fern

Woodwardia radicans, the chain fern, European chain fern or rooting chainfern, is a species of fern in the family Blechnaceae, mainly found in Macaronesia and southwestern Europe, but is also found in southern Italy and Crete. Growing to 1.8 m (6 ft) tall by 2 m (7 ft) broad, it is evergreen with arching fronds. The pinnae have curved, finely-toothed segments. The plant derives its common name from the linked sori on the undersides of the fronds.

The specific epithet radicans means "with stems that take root", referring to rooting plantlets appearing at the tips of the fronds.

This plant is cultivated as an ornamental, and in the UK has gained the Royal Horticultural Society's Award of Garden Merit. Unlike its hardier cousin Woodwardia unigemmata, it is prone to frost damage and requires protection in colder areas.

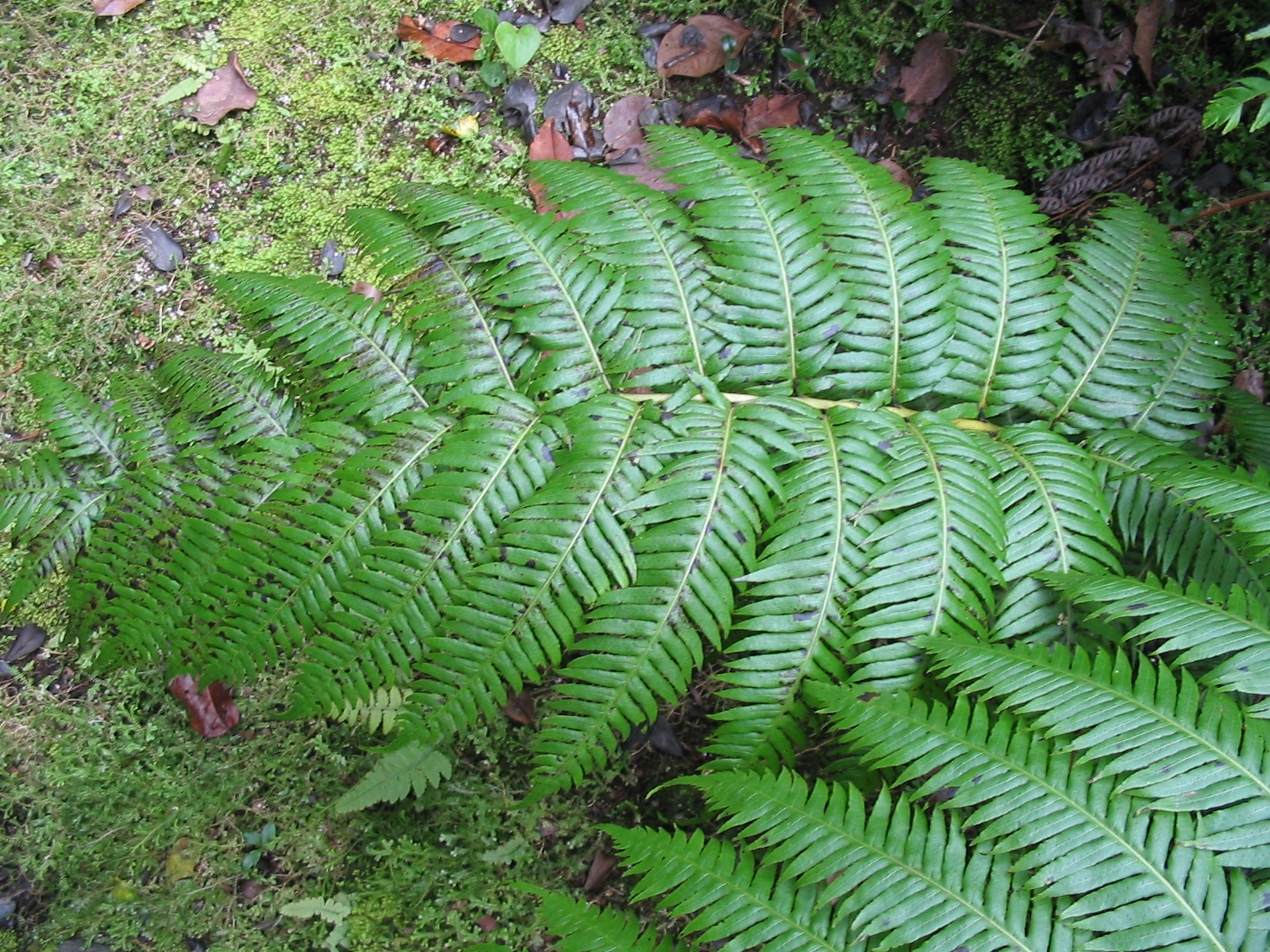
