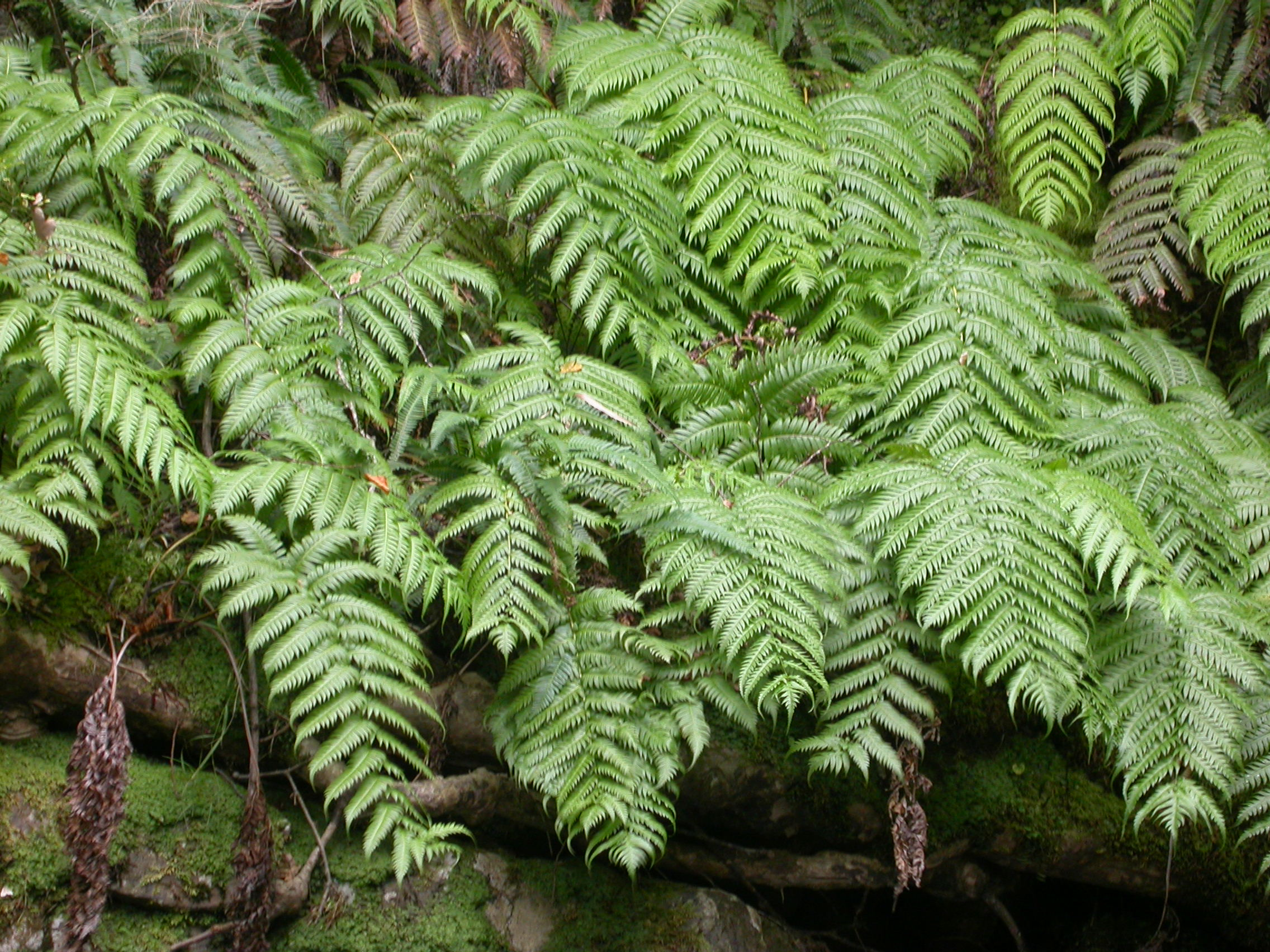
- Woodwardia radicans

Scientific classification
- Kingdom: Plantae
- Clade: Tracheophytes
- Division: Polypodiophyta
- Class: Polypodiopsida
- Order: Polypodiales
- Suborder: Aspleniineae
- Family: Blechnaceae
- Subfamily: Woodwardiodeae
- Genus: Woodwardia; Sm.

Species
- See text.

Synonyms
- Anchistea C.Presl; Chieniopteris Ching; Lorinseria C.Presl

= Woodwardia =

Woodwardia Temporal range: Paleocene–Recent

Genus of ferns

Woodwardia is a genus of ferns in the family Blechnaceae, in the suborder Aspleniineae (eupolypods II) of the order Polypodiales. Species are known as netted-chain ferns. The genus is native to warm temperate and subtropical regions of the Northern Hemisphere. They are large ferns, with fronds growing to 50–300 cm long depending on the species. The fossil record of the genus extends to the Paleocene.

== Taxonomy ==
Woodwardia was first described by James Edward Smith in 1793. It was named after Thomas Jenkinson Woodward. When broadly circumscribed, the genus contains about 15 species (plus some hybrids). In the Pteridophyte Phylogeny Group classification of 2016 (PPG I), the genera Anchistea and Lorinseria (each with one species) are kept separate.

=== Species ===
As of September 2024, Plants of the World Online accepts the following species, excluding those placed in other genera in the PPG I system.

Image	Scientific name	Distribution
	Woodwardia auriculata Blume	Peninsula Malaysia to Sumatera, W. Jawa
	Woodwardia fimbriata Sm.	W. Canada to Mexico (Baja California Norte, Sonora)
	Woodwardia harlandii Hook.	S. China to Japan (Yakushima) and N. Indo-China
	Woodwardia japonica (L.f.) Sm.	S. China to Indo-China, Temp. E. Asia
	Woodwardia kempii Copel.	SE. China, Taiwan, Japan (Mishima, Yakushima).
	Woodwardia magnifica Ching & P.S.Chiu	China (Yunnan) to Vietnam.
	Woodwardia martinezii Maxon ex Weath.	Mexico (Hidalgo, Puebla, Veracruz)
	Woodwardia orientalis (Sw.) Sw.	E. China, Japan to Philippines.
	Woodwardia prolifera Hook. & Arn.	SE. China to S. Central & S. Japan and Philippines (Bataan Islands)
	Woodwardia radicans (L.) Sm.	Macaronesia, Mediterranean
	Woodwardia spinulosa M.Martens & Galeotti	Mexico to Central America.
	Woodwardia unigemmata (Makino) Nakai	Pakistan to S. Central & S. Japan and N. Indo-China, Jawa, Philippines, New Guinea
	Woodwardia virginica (L.) Sm.	E. Canada to E. Central & E. U.S.A.

Natural Hybrids

Image	Name and Parentage	Distribution
	Woodwardia × intermedia Christ (W. japonica × W. orientalis)	S. Japan
	Woodwardia × izuensis Sa.Kurata (W. orientalis × W. unigemmata)	SC. Japan
	Woodwardia × semicordata Mickel & Beitel (W. martinezii × W. spinulosa)	Mexico

Species placed elsewhere in PPG I are:

- Woodwardia areolata (L.) T.Moore = Lorinseria areolata (L.) C.Presl
- Woodwardia virginica (L.) Sm. = Anchistea virginica (L.) C.Presl
- Woodwardia sp. Pons., 1964 Late Miocene to Pliocene (Late Cretaceous?)
Some species have large leaves, such as W. orientalis. Leaves are deeply bipinnatifid. Young leaves of W. orientalis are red and the young adventitious buds on the leaf surface are also red.
