= Pier Antonio Micheli =

Italian botanist (1679–1737)

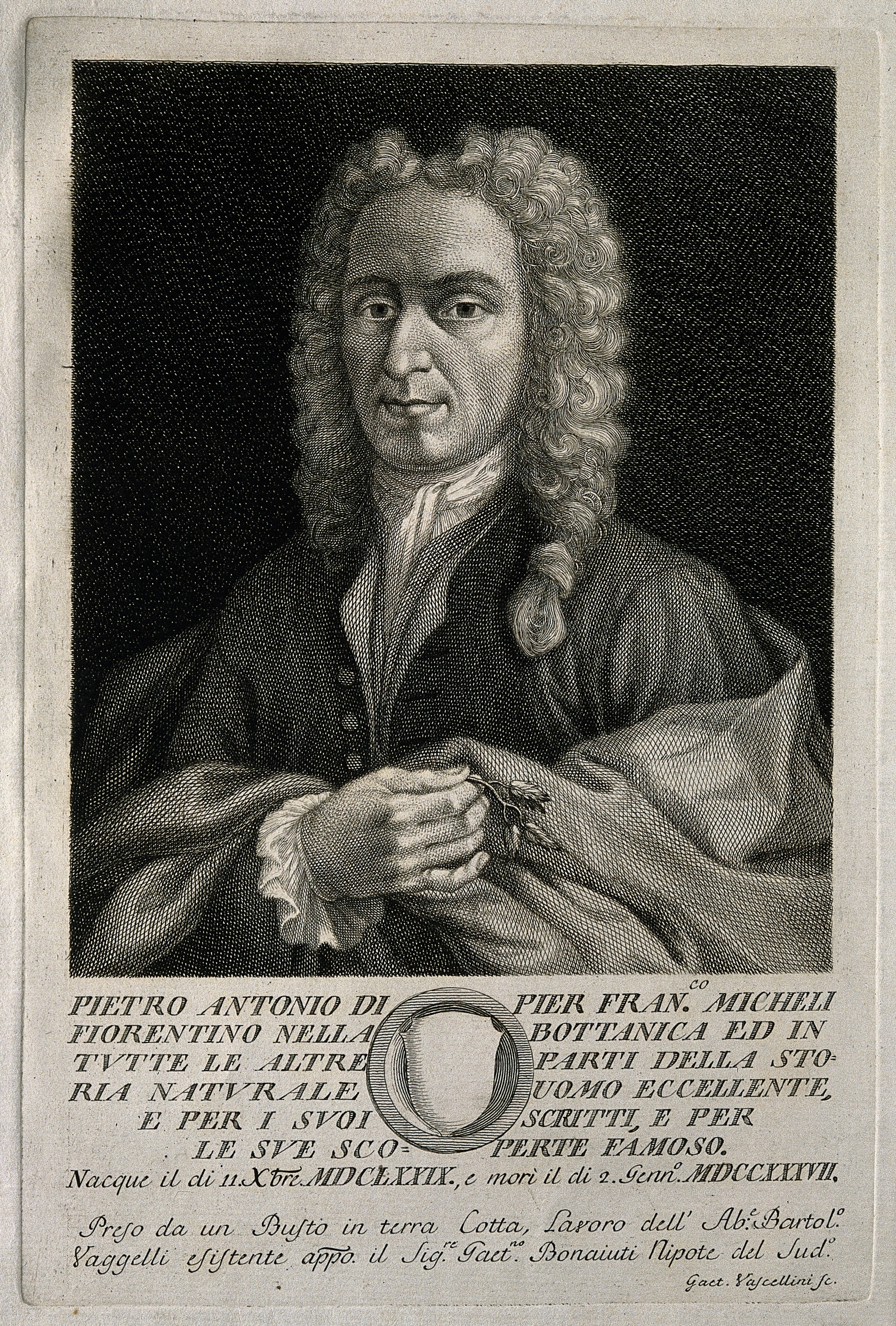
- Born: 11 December 1679; Florence, Italy
- Died: 1 January 1737 (aged 57); Florence, Italy
- Citizenship: Italian
- Scientific career
- Fields: Botany; Mycology
- Academic advisors: Bruno Tozzi

Pier Antonio Micheli (11 December 1679 – 1 January 1737) was a noted Italian botanist, professor of botany in Pisa, curator of the Orto Botanico di Firenze, author of Nova plantarum genera iuxta Tournefortii methodum disposita. Micheli is considered the founder of mycology. He discovered the spores of mushrooms, was a leading authority on cryptogams, and coined several important genera of microfungi including Aspergillus and Botrytis.

== Biography ==
Micheli was born in Florence in 1679. He taught himself Latin and began the study of plants at a young age under Bruno Tozzi. In 1706 he was appointed botanist to Cosimo III de' Medici, Grand Duke of Tuscany, director of the Florence gardens, and a professor at the University of Pisa.

His Nova plantarum genera (1729) was a major step in the knowledge of fungi. In this work, he gave descriptions of 1900 plants, of which about 1400 were described for the first time. Among these were 900 fungi and lichens, accompanied by 73 plates. He included information on "the planting, origin and growth of fungi, mucors, and allied plants", and was the first to point out that fungi have reproductive bodies or spores. His work was met with skepticism by other botanists of the time.

He observed that when spores were placed on slices of melon the same type of fungi were produced that the spores came from, and from this observation he noted that fungi did not arise from spontaneous generation. He also formulated a systematic classification system with keys for genera and species.

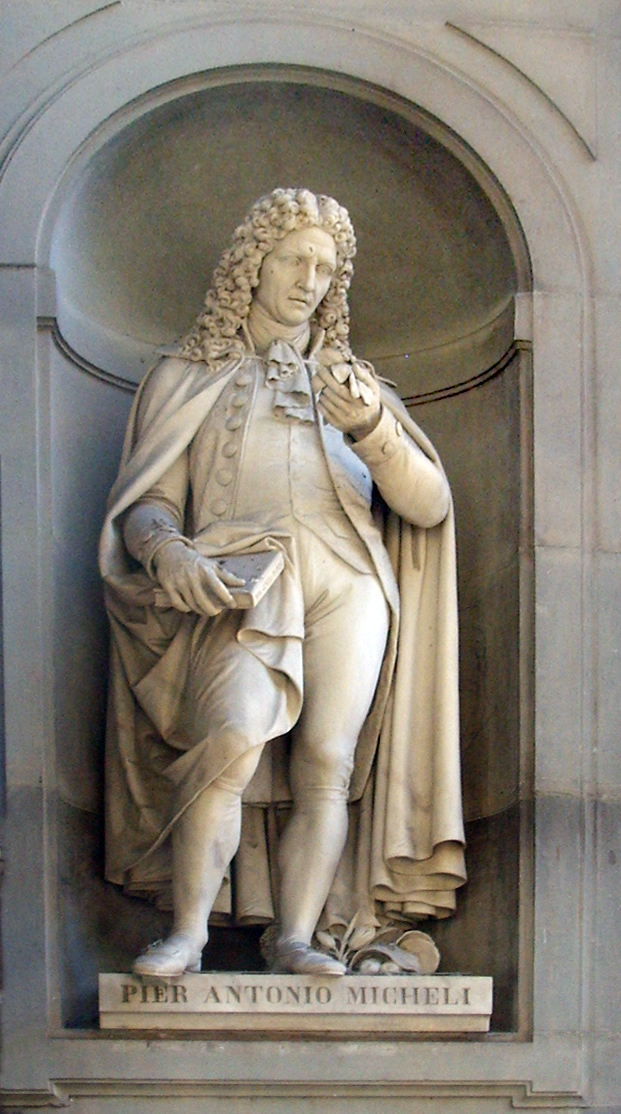
Statue of Micheli among the gallery of famous Tuscans in the Loggiato of the Uffizi, sculpted by Vincenzo Costiani

He was a collector of plant and mineral specimens, and on one of his collecting trips, in 1736, he contracted pleurisy, of which he soon after died in Florence.

== Eponymy ==
- In 1737, Linnaeus called the genus Michelia after him.
- Via Micheli, Florence, home of the Orto Botanico di Firenze, is named in his honor.
