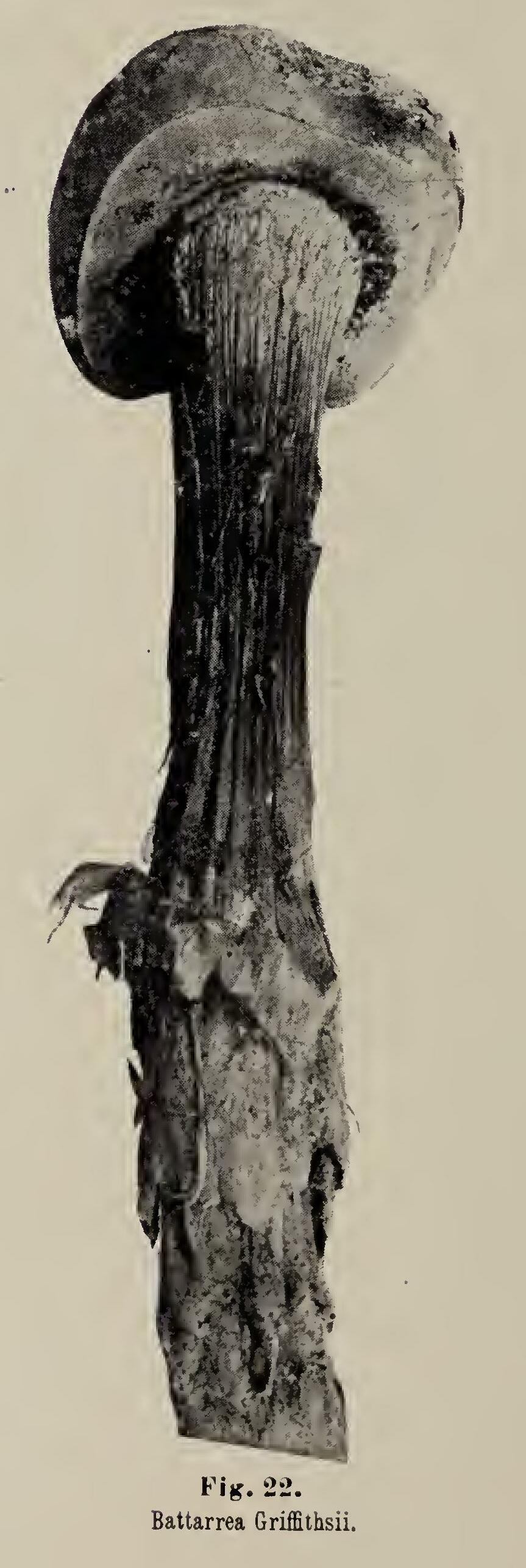
- Battarrea griffithsii from mycological writings of C. G. Lloyd

Scientific classification
- Kingdom: Fungi
- Division: Basidiomycota
- Class: Agaricomycetes
- Order: Agaricales
- Family: Agaricaceae
- Genus: Battarrea
- Species: B. griffithsii

Binomial name
- Battarrea griffithsii White, 1901

= Battarrea griffithsii =

Species of fungus in the family Agaricaceae

Battarrea griffithsii is a species of mushroom in the family Agaricaceae.

== Taxonomy ==
Battarrea griffithsii was first described by V.S. White in a 1901 Bulletin of the Torrey Botanical Club.
