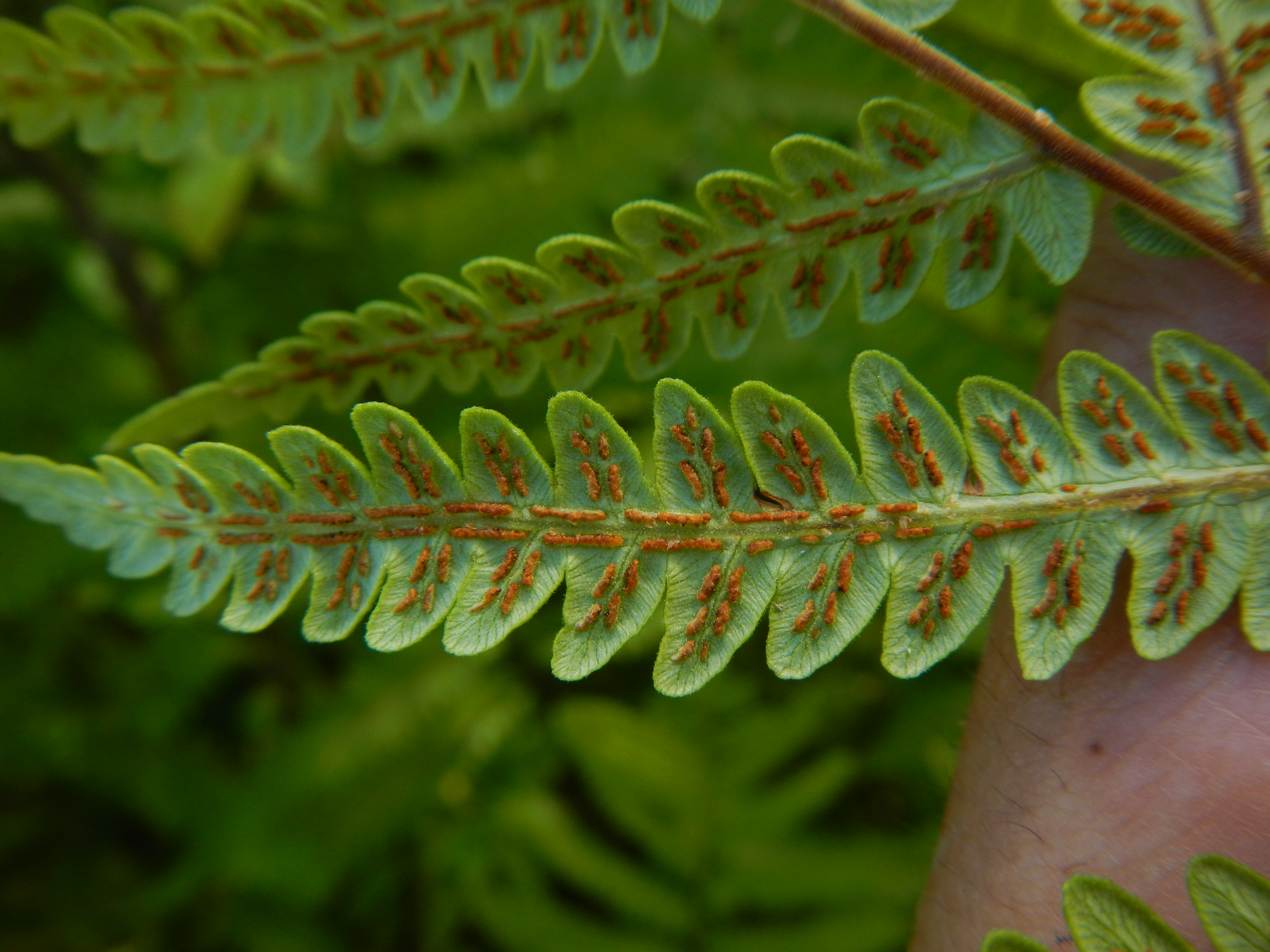
- Sori

Conservation status
- Secure (NatureServe)

Scientific classification
- Kingdom: Plantae
- Clade: Tracheophytes
- Division: Polypodiophyta
- Class: Polypodiopsida
- Order: Polypodiales
- Suborder: Aspleniineae
- Family: Blechnaceae
- Genus: Anchistea; C.Presl
- Species: A. virginica

Binomial name
- Anchistea virginica (L.) C.Presl

Synonyms
- Blechnum virginicum L.; Woodwardia virginica (L.) Sm.

= Anchistea =

Virginia chain fern

Genus of ferns

Anchistea is a genus of leptosporangiate ferns in the family Blechnaceae. It has only one species, Anchistea virginica (synonym Woodwardia virginica) the Virginia chain fern, which has long creeping, scaly, underground stems or rhizomes giving rise to tall (up to about 4 feet, 120 centimetres) widely separated, deciduous, single leaves. In contrast, the leaves of Osmundastrum cinnamomeum, which can be mistaken for A. virginica, grow in a group from a crown. Also in contrast to O. cinnamomeum the leaves are monomorphic without distinct fertile fronds. The lower petiole or stipe is dark purple to black, shiny and swollen, the upper rachis is dull green. The leaf blade is green and lanceolate, composed of 12 to 23 paired, alternate pinnatifid pinnae. The pinnae are subdivided into 15 to 20 paired segments that are ovate to oblong. The lower rachis is naked for about half its length. The sori or spore-producing bodies are found on the underside of the pinnae and are long and form a double row which outlines the major veins of the pinnae. In common with all ferns, A. virginica exhibits a gametophyte stage in its life cycle (alternation of generations) and develops a haploid reproductive prothallus as an independent plant. The spores are produced in red-brown sori which line the spaces (areolae) between the costa and costules. Further photographs can be found at the Connecticut Botanical Society and Ontario Ferns websites.

== Taxonomy and evolution ==
Anchistea virginica was first described by Carl Linnaeus in 1771 as Blechnum virginicum. It was transferred to Woodwardia by James Edward Smith in 1793, and to Anchistea by Carl Presl in 1851. Some sources retain it in Woodwardia, but the Pteridophyte Phylogeny Group classification of 2016 (PPG I) retains Presl's genus, making it the sole species in Anchistea.

Fossils of Anchistea virginica have been described from the Middle Miocene of the U.S. states of Washington and Mississippi, suggesting its range was probably once much more widespread in North America. In the Middle Miocene, Anchistea virginica apparently occupied similar habitats as in the present day.

== Distribution ==
Endemic to eastern North America from Florida to Nova Scotia and west to Michigan and Illinois. A. virginica is mostly found on the Atlantic coastal plain and Piedmont although it also grows in the eastern Great Lakes region as far west as Illinois. The Flora of North America website has a distribution map.

== Ecology and conservation ==
Anchistea virginica grows in the wet soils of open wet swampy woods, acid bogs, and along streams and roadside ditches, avoiding calcareous substrates. A. virginica is an important constituent of the field layer of flatwoods, Atlantic white cedar (Chamaecyparis thyoides) swamp forest and bay (Magnolia virginiana) forests.

== Cultivation and uses ==
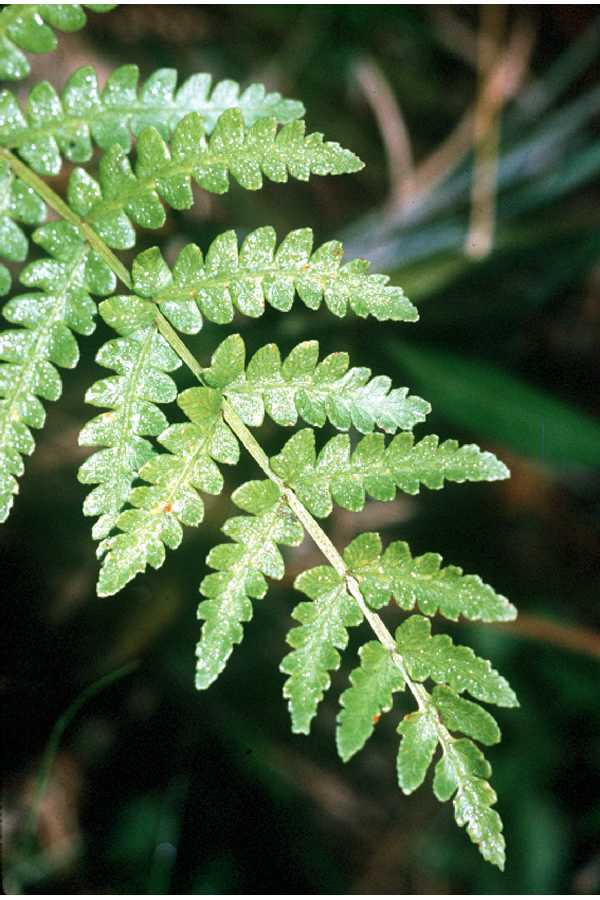
Detail of frond

The plant is occasionally cultivated as a greenhouse or garden ornamental. Hardy to USDA Zone 3.
