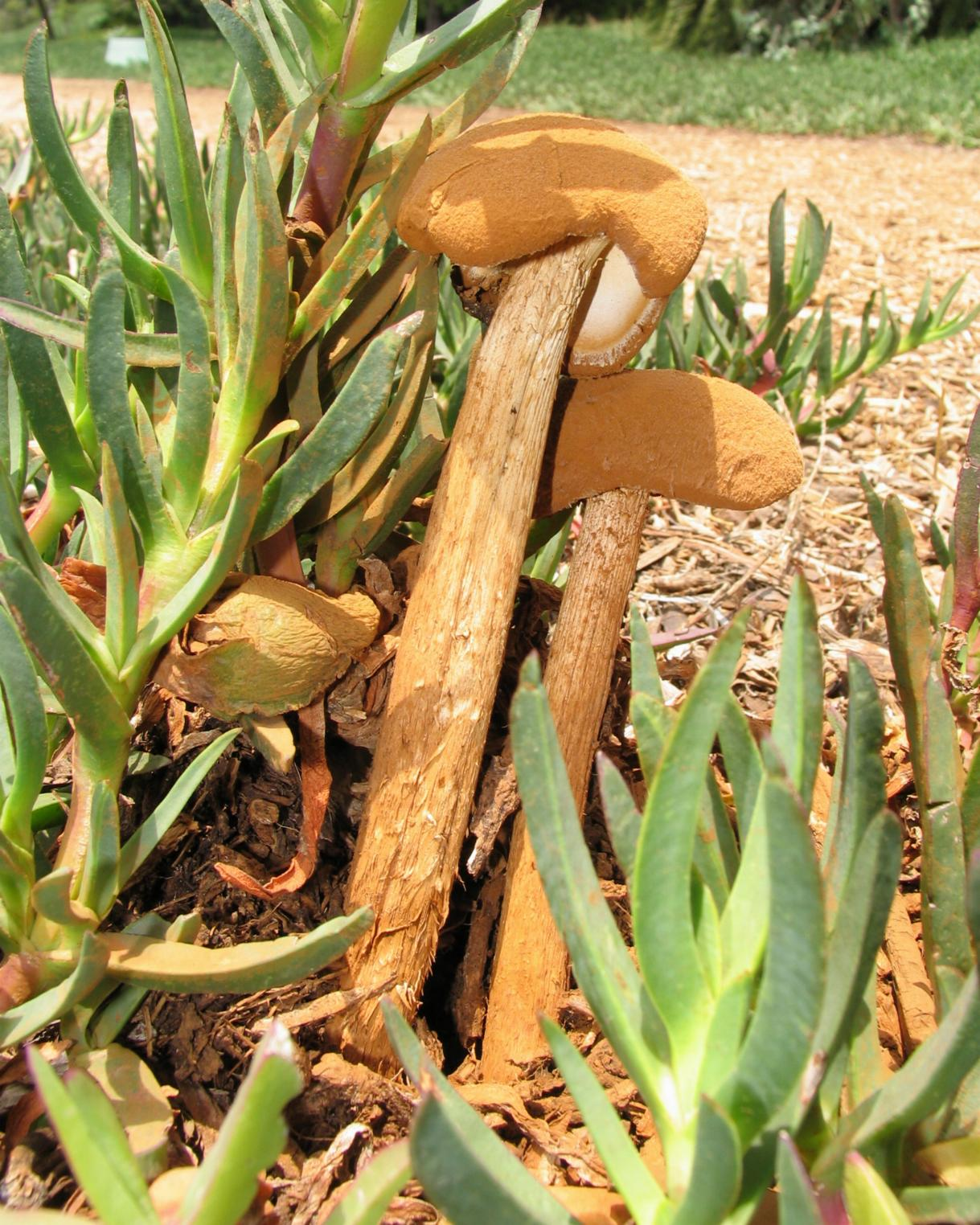
- Battarrea phalloides

Scientific classification
- Kingdom: Fungi
- Division: Basidiomycota
- Class: Agaricomycetes
- Order: Agaricales
- Family: Agaricaceae
- Genus: Battarrea; Pers. (1801)

Type species
- Battarrea phalloides (Dicks.) Pers. (1801)

Synonyms
- Dendromyces Libosch. (1810); Sphaericeps Welw. & Curr. (1868)

= Battarrea =

Genus of fungi

Battarrea is a genus of mushroom-producing fungi. The genus used to be classified in the family Tulostomaceae until molecular phylogenetics revealed its affinity to the Agaricaceae. Species of Battarrea have a peridium (spore sac) that rests atop an elongated, hollow stipe with a surface that tends to become torn into fibrous scales. Inside the peridium, the gleba consists of spherical, warted spores, and a capillitium of simple or branched hyphal threads that have spiral or angular thickenings. The genus is named after Italian priest and mycologist Giovanni Antonio Battarra.

== Species ==
- Battarrea arenicola Copel. (1904)
- Battarrea franciscana Copel. (1904)
- Battarrea guachiparum Speg. (1898)
- Battarrea griffithsii Underw., Bulletin of the Torrey Botanical Club 28: 440 (1901)
- Battarrea laciniata Underw. ex V.S.White (1901)
- Battarrea levispora Massee (1901)
- Battarrea patagonica Speg. (1898)
- Battarrea phalloides (Dicks.) Pers. (1801)

== See also ==
- List of Agaricaceae genera
- List of Agaricales genera
