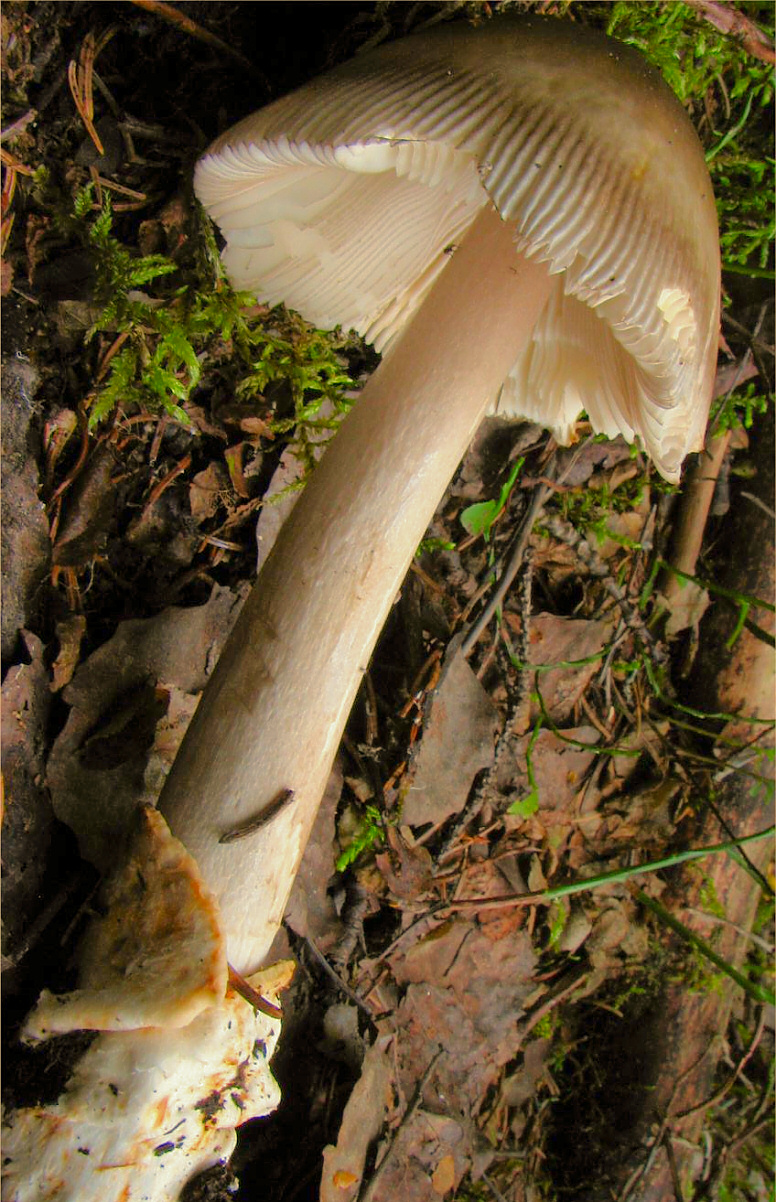

Scientific classification
- Kingdom: Fungi
- Division: Basidiomycota
- Class: Agaricomycetes
- Order: Agaricales
- Family: Amanitaceae
- Genus: Amanita
- Species: A. battarrae

Binomial name
- Amanita battarrae (Boud.) Bon 1985

= Amanita battarrae =

Species of fungus

Amanita battarrae, also known as the grey-zoned ringless amanita, is a species of Amanita found in Italy in the fall as well as in eastern Europe.

Described in 1902 by the French mycologist Jean Louis Émile Boudier, who named it Amanitopsis battarrae, this rare mushroom was given its currently-accepted scientific name in 1985 by the famous French mycologist Marcel Bon (1925–2014).

It is reported to be edible when cooked.
