= Bruno Tozzi =

Italian naturalist (1656–1743)

Dom Bruno Tozzi FRS
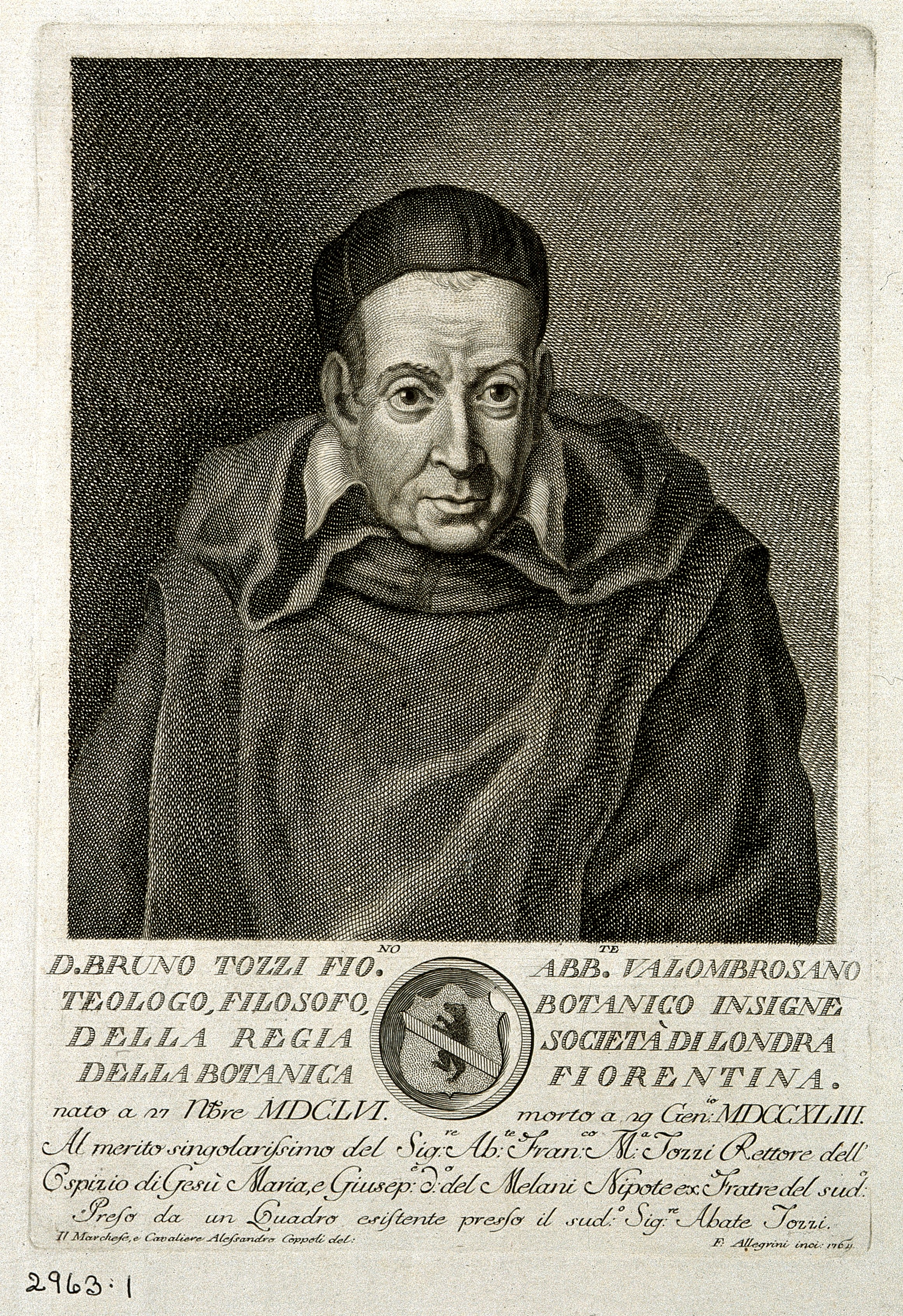
- Engraving of Tozzi
- Born: 27 November 1656; Montevarchi, Grand Duchy of Tuscany
- Died: 29 January 1743 (aged 86); Vallombrosa, Grand Duchy of Tuscany
- Father: Francesco di Simone Tozzi
- Scientific career
- Fields: Botany and mycology
- Notable students: Pier Antonio Micheli

Dom Bruno Tozzi FRS (27 November 1656 – 29 January 1743) was an Italian monk, botanist and mycologist. An abbot of the Vallombrosan Order, he was a mentor for Pier Antonio Micheli who named the plant genus Tozzia in his honour.

== Biography ==
Tozzi was born in Montevarchi and his father, Francesco di Simone Tozzi, came from Florence. He was ordained in the Vallombrosan Order on 5 May 1676. He took an interest in the study of nature, travelling into the Alps and across Italy, collecting natural history specimens. Along with Pier Antonio Micheli, he took an interest in the fungi and described many species with illustrations. His manuscript Sylva fungorum is preserved at the Biblioteca Nazionale in Florence. Tozzi was elected a Fellow of the Royal Society in 1715 and corresponded with James Petiver, Hans Sloane and other naturalists of the period. He was a founder of the Società Botanica Fiorentina. He lived a solitary life as a monk and died in Vallombrosa.

== Bibliography ==
- Pirotta, R.; Chiovenda, E. (1901). "Flora romana. Bibliografia e storia". Annuario del R. Istituto Botanico di Roma. 10 (2): 292–295.
