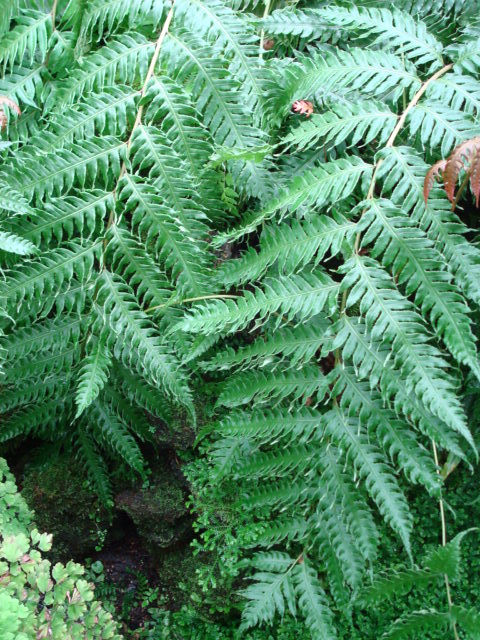

Scientific classification
- Kingdom: Plantae
- Clade: Tracheophytes
- Division: Polypodiophyta
- Class: Polypodiopsida
- Order: Polypodiales
- Suborder: Aspleniineae
- Family: Blechnaceae
- Genus: Woodwardia
- Species: W. unigemmata

Binomial name
- Woodwardia unigemmata (Makino) Nakai

Synonyms
- Homotypic Synonyms: Woodwardia radicans var. unigemmata Makino; Heterotypic Synonyms: Blechnum japonicum Houtt.; Woodwardia himalaica Ching & S.K.Wu; Woodwardia latiloba Ching & P.S.Chiu; Woodwardia maxima Ching ex P.S.Chiu; Woodwardia yunnanensis Ching & P.S.Chiu

= Woodwardia unigemmata =

Species of fern

Woodwardia unigemmata is a species of evergreen fern in the family Aspleniaceae. It is sometimes referred to by the common name jewelled chain fern. It is native to Assam, China (North-Central, South-Central, and Southeast), East and West Himalaya, Japan, Java, Myanmar, Nepal, New Guinea, Pakistan, the Philippines, Taiwan, Tibet, and Vietnam. Growing to 1.5 m (4.9 ft) tall by 2.5 m (8.2 ft) broad, it bears pinnately-divided fronds which emerge red and turn green when mature. It occurs in areas of high rainfall.

This plant is grown as an ornamental, and in the UK has gained the Royal Horticultural Society's Award of Garden Merit. It is an imposing architectural subject which is thought to be hardy down to −10 °C (14 °F). However it requires a sheltered position in well-cultivated, reliably moist soil.
