= Thomas Jenkinson Woodward =

Thomas Jenkinson Woodward (1745–1820) was an English botanist.

== Life ==
Born 23 Feb 1745, he was a native of Huntingdon. His parents died when he was quite young, leaving him, however, financially independent. He was educated at Eton College and Clare Hall, Cambridge, where he graduated LL.B. in 1769. Shortly after that he married Frances (d. 27 November 1833), the daughter and heiress of Thomas Manning of Bungay, Suffolk.

Woodward was appointed a magistrate and deputy-lieutenant for the county of Suffolk. When he moved to Walcot Hall, Diss, Norfolk, he took on the same posts for that county. On the establishment of the volunteer system he became lieutenant-colonel of the Diss volunteers.

Woodward was elected a fellow of the Linnean Society of London in 1789. He died at Diss on 28 January 1820, and was buried there. He left no issue.

== Works ==
Woodward was described by Sir James Edward Smith as one of the best English botanists; and it was in his honour that Smith named the fern genus Woodwardia. He was joint-author with Samuel Goodenough of Observations on the British Fuci, London, 1797, and contributed papers to the Philosophical Transactions and the Transactions of the Linnean Society of London between 1784 and 1794, on fungi and algæ. He also furnished information to Smith for James Sowerby's English Botany, and to William Withering for the second edition of his Systematic Arrangement of British Plants, as well as to Thomas Martyn for his edition of Philip Miller's Gardeners' Dictionary.

== Notes ==
Attribution

This article incorporates text from a publication now in the public domain: "Woodward, Thomas Jenkinson". Dictionary of National Biography. London: Smith, Elder & Co. 1885–1900.
