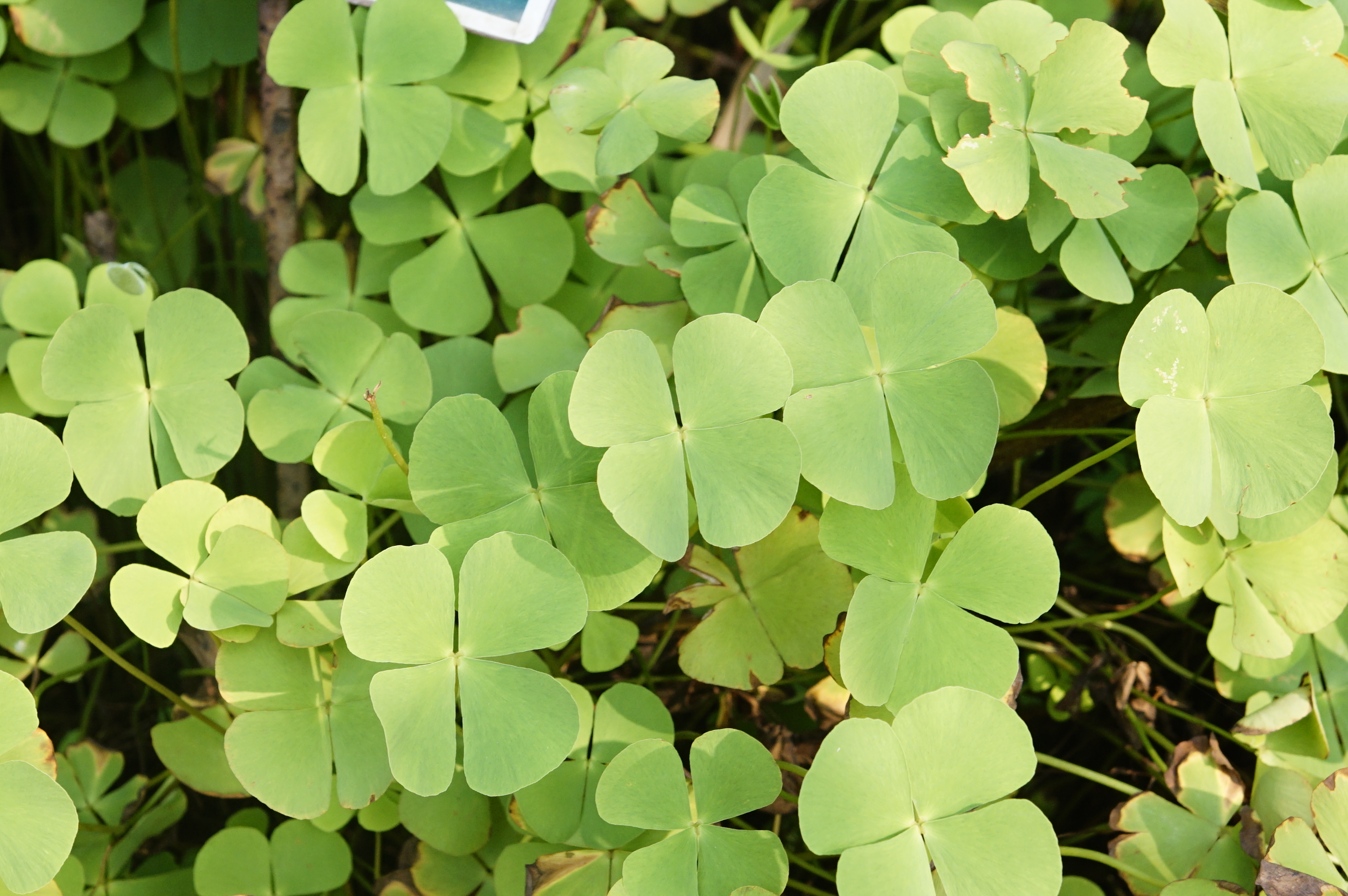
- Marsilea minuta

Conservation status
- Least Concern (IUCN 3.1)

Scientific classification
- Kingdom: Plantae
- Clade: Tracheophytes
- Division: Polypodiophyta
- Class: Polypodiopsida
- Order: Salviniales
- Family: Marsileaceae
- Genus: Marsilea
- Species: M. minuta

Binomial name
- Marsilea minuta L. 1771

Subspecies
- Marsilea minuta var. incurva (A. Braun) Launert; Marsilea minuta var. zollingeri (A.Braun) Baker
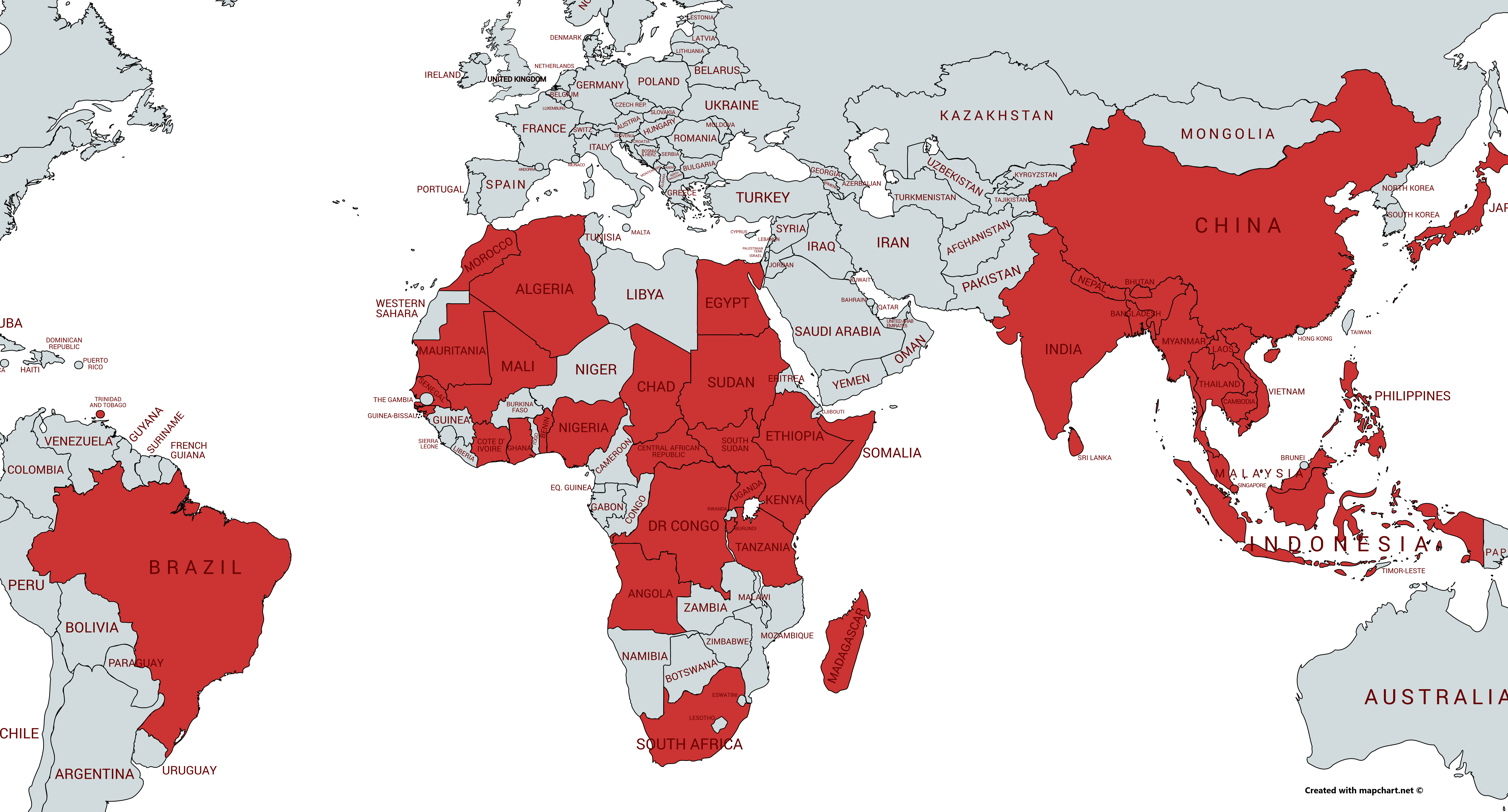
- Native range of Marsilea minuta

Synonyms
- List: Lemma minuta (L.) Desr.; Lemma minuta (L.) Desr. ex Lam.; Marsilea aegyptiaca Wall.; Marsilea brachycarpa A. Br.; Marsilea brachypus A. Br.; Marsilea brasiliensis Mart.; Marsilea cornuta A. Br.; Marsilea coromandelica Burm. fil.; Marsilea crenata Presl; Marsilea crenulata Desv.; Marsilea diffusa Lepr.; Marsilea diffusa Leprieur ex A. Br.; Marsilea diffusa var. approximata A. Braun; Marsilea diffusa var. cornuta A. Br.; Marsilea elata var. crenata (C. Presl) Sadeb.; Marsilea erosa Willd.; Marsilea gracilenta A. Br.; Marsilea maheshwarii Gupta; Marsilea major (Haines) Chowdhury; Marsilea mearnsii Christ; Marsilea microcarpa A. Br.; Marsilea minuta var. indica Gupta; Marsilea minuta var. minor Haines; Marsilea minuta var. minuta; Marsilea perrieriana C. Chr.; Marsilea polycarpa var. mexicana A. Braun; Marsilea poonensis Kolhatkar; Marsilea polycarpa Hook. & Grev.; Marsilea rotundata Wild.; Marsilea sinensis Hand.-Mazz.; Marsilea tenax Peter; Marsilea tetraphylla Thunb.; Marsilea vulgaris Bory; Zalusianskya coromandelica (Burm. fil.) O. Kuntze; Zalusianskya crenulata (Desv.) O. Kuntze; Zalusianskya diffusa (A. Br.) O. Kuntze; Zalusianskya minuta (L.) O. Kuntze; Zaluzianskia polycarpa (Hook. & Grev.) Kuntze

= Marsilea minuta =

Species of aquatic fern

Marsilea minuta, or dwarf waterclover is a species of aquatic fern in the family Marsileaceae. It is not to be confused with Marsilea minuta E.Fourn. 1880, which is a synonym for Marsilea vestita. Other common names include gelid waterklawer, small water clover, airy pepperwort, and pepperwort, though the lattermost also applies to plants in the genus Lepidium. In French it is called marsilea à quatre feuilles (literally "four-leafed marsilea") and petite marsilée (literally "little Marsilea"), the latter appearing to be a calque with the Latin botanical name. In Chinese it is 南国田字草 (nan guo tian zi cao), literally "southern field word grass," referencing the similarity of the leaflet shape to the Chinese character for "field." The Koch Rajbongshi people and Garo people call it shusni shak. It is called 'শুশনি শাক' (shushni shak) in Bengali. In parts of India it can be called sunisanakka. In Indonesian it is semanggi (literally "clover"), but this name also applies to Marsilea crenata. In Japanese it is nangokudenjiso and in Thai it is phakwaen. In Malaysian it is tapak itik (literally "duck footprints"). In the Philippines it is kaya-kayapuan (literally "so crowded").

== Description ==
M. minuta has a variable appearance, which often leads to confusion with closely related species. In the water the plant is creeping and spreading, while on land it can appear cushion-like. It typically is perennial but sometimes appears annual. It is a tenagophyte, with the juvenile growing submerged and the adult typically terrestrial.

It has a light brown to green rhizome that is 0.4–0.8 millimetres (1/64–1/32 in) thick with short tan hairs at the ends and internodal roots. The land leaves are on erect, terete, 5–13 centimetres (2.0–5.1 in) long petioles. The leaflets are 0.8–1.7 centimetres (3/8–5/8 in) by 1.2–2 centimetres (1/2–3/4 in), mostly glabrous, cuneate or flabellate. The leaves in water are typically not floating, but emergent from the water. Fertile leaves are produced on land with up to four sporocarps each at penduncles near the base of the petiole. It has a small sporocarp that is 2.6–4.1 millimetres (7/64–5/32 in) long, 2.4–3.1 millimetres (3/32–1/8 in) wide, and 1.3–1.7 millimetres (3/64–1/16 in) thick. The sporocarp has a superior tooth at the apex of the stalk and an inferior tooth at the base. The sporocarp has a conspicuous 1.5–2.2 millimetres (1/16–3/32 in) long raphe, about two-thirds the length of the sporocarp and semi-terete. Unlike a few Marsilea species, M. minuta sporocarps mature above ground.

Genomic information
- NCBI ID: 388479
- Ploidy: diploid
- Number of chromosomes: 40

== Taxonomy ==
M. minuta is thought to be closely related to Marsilea quadrifolia. Molecular phylogenetic analysis of the genus Marsilea puts both in a widespread Old World subgroup also called "Marsilea" along with M. angustifolia, M. drummondii, M. crenata, and M. fadeniana and indicating that M. crenata is actually a synonym of M. minuta.

- Marsilea subgroup
  - - - M. angustifolia
      - M. drummondii
    - M. minuta‑M. crenata‑M. fadeniana complex

== Habitat and ecology ==
Marsilea minuta can grow from sea level up to 1,950 m (6,400 ft) in elevation in ponds and other shallow water. It can grow in fresh water or brackish water in clay or sandy soil. The plant can develop into large colonies, and can be weedy. Some of its preferred habitat is being lost to agriculture but as it readily grows in Paddy fields, drainage ditches, and other marginal areas its overall population is stable. It has the potential to be invasive and dispersal through aquarium trade and other human means should be limited.

It is a native plant in the following countries:

- Algeria
- Angola
- Bangladesh
- Benin
- Bhutan
- Brazil
- Burundi
- Cambodia
- Central African Republic
- Chad
- China
- Comoros
- Democratic Republic of the Congo
- Côte d'Ivoire
- Egypt
- Ethiopia
- Ghana
- Guinea-Bissau
- India
- Indonesia
- Japan
- Kenya
- Laos
- Madagascar
- Malaysia
- Maldives
- Mali
- Mauritania
- Morocco
- Myanmar
- Nepal
- Nigeria
- Philippines
- Réunion
- Senegal
- Singapore
- Somalia
- South Africa
- South Sudan
- Sri Lanka
- Sudan
- Tanzania
- Thailand
- Trinidad and Tobago
- Uganda
- Vietnam

The leaves and sporocarps of M. minuta are eaten by many waterfowl species, and the intact sporocarps pass through undigested to be spread to new areas. Elophila responsalis also feeds on the leaves, but is not thought to do much damage to the plant.

The plant is susceptible to herbicides such as bensulfuron-methyl, cinosulfuron, 2,4-dichlorophenoxyacetic acid, oxyfluorfen, and paraquat. Otherwise it can tolerate high levels of organic pollution.

== Uses ==
It is eaten in India, Sri Lanka, and in Bangladesh. In China it is used as forage. It has a raw protein content of 3.3%.

The plant is used traditionally in China for edema, skin injuries, snakebite, and inflammation. In Mymensingh District it is traditionally used to treat cough, headache, hypertension, sleep disorders, and respiratory diseases. It is combined with Nardostachys jatamansi and after development by Asima Chatterjee sold as an ayurvedic treatment for epilepsy called Ayush-56. However, Ayush-56 does not show encouraging results in treating the disease. It is also used as a phytoremediator of arsenic while growing with rice plants.

== Gallery ==
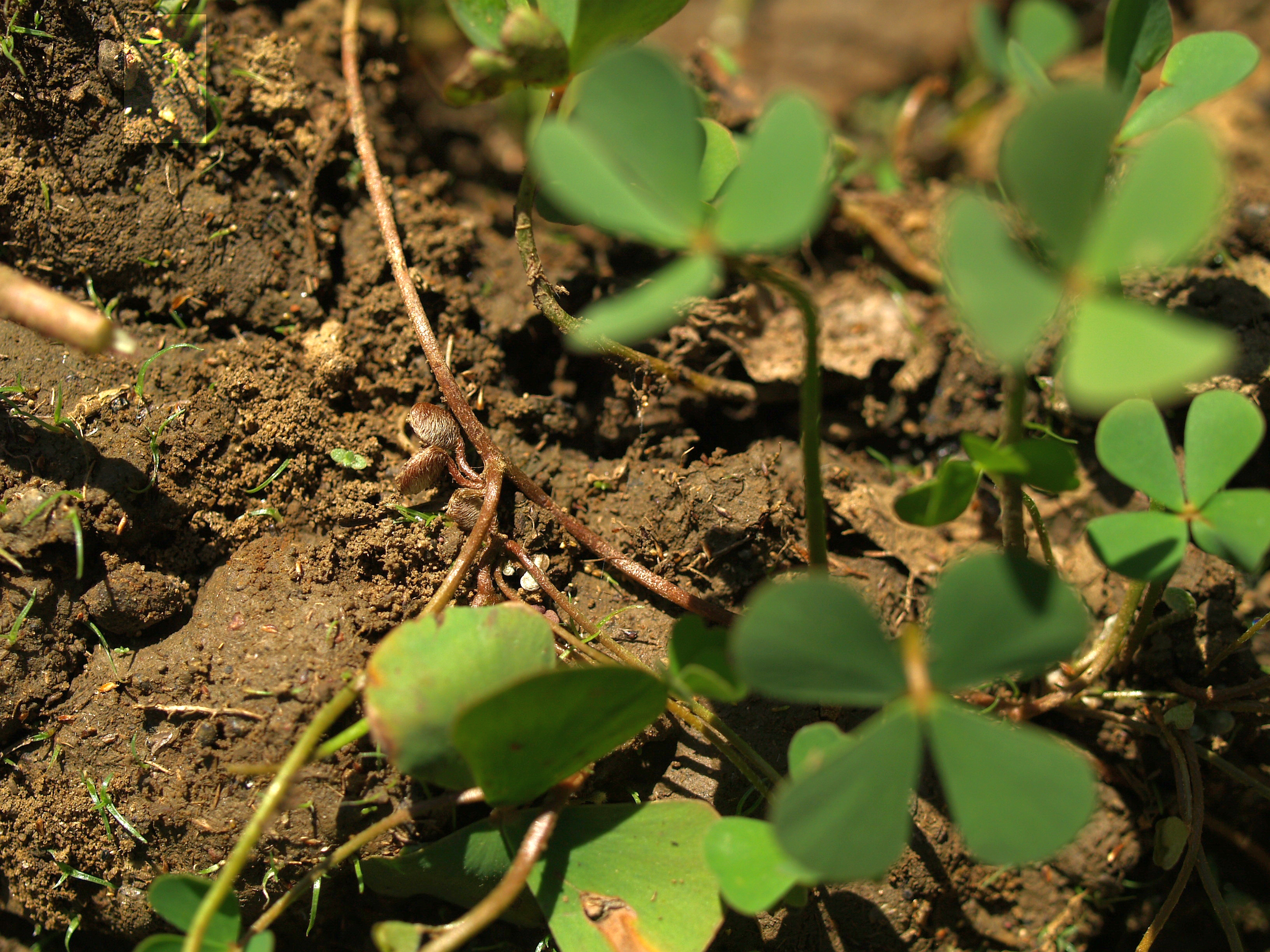

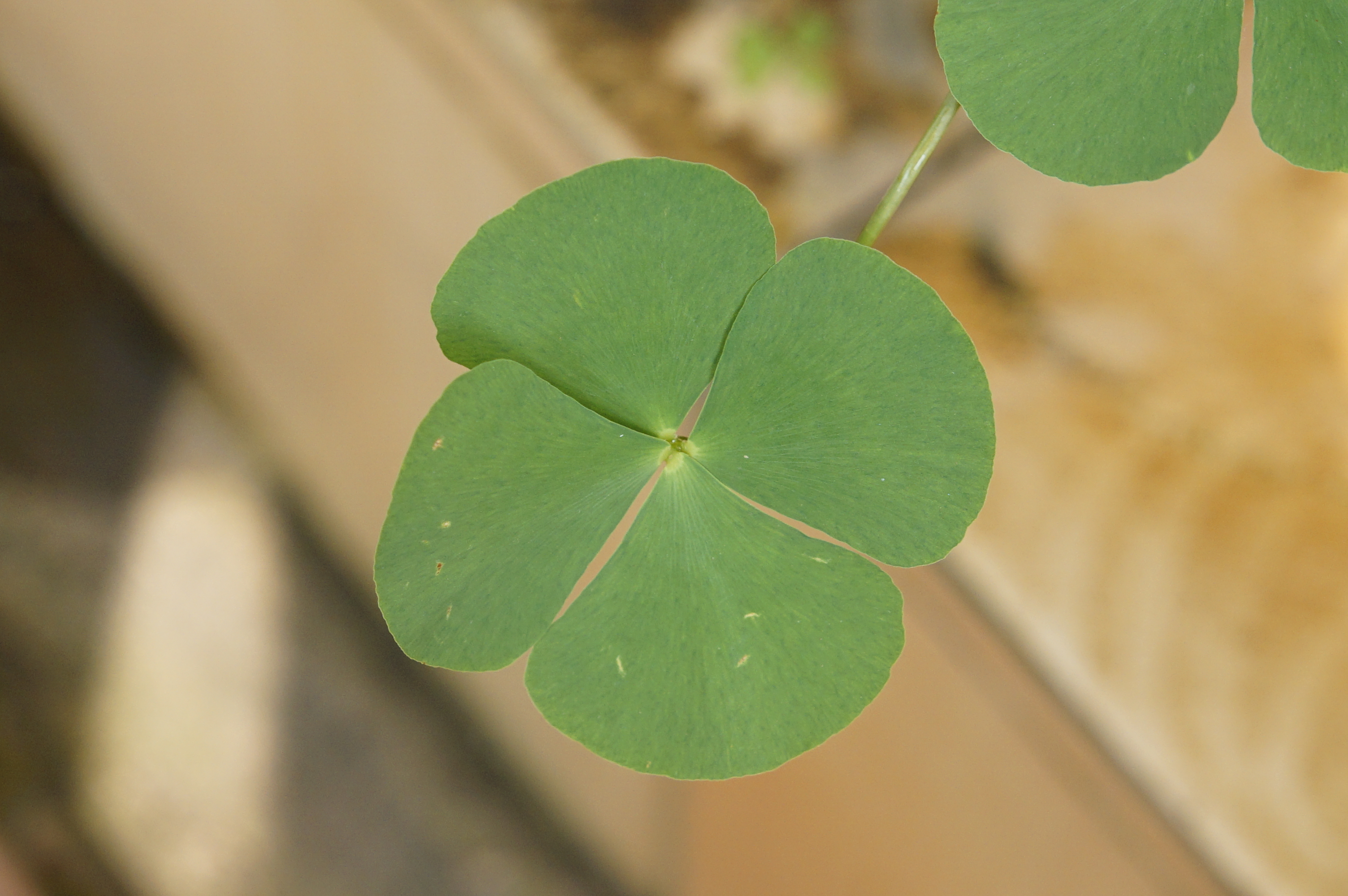

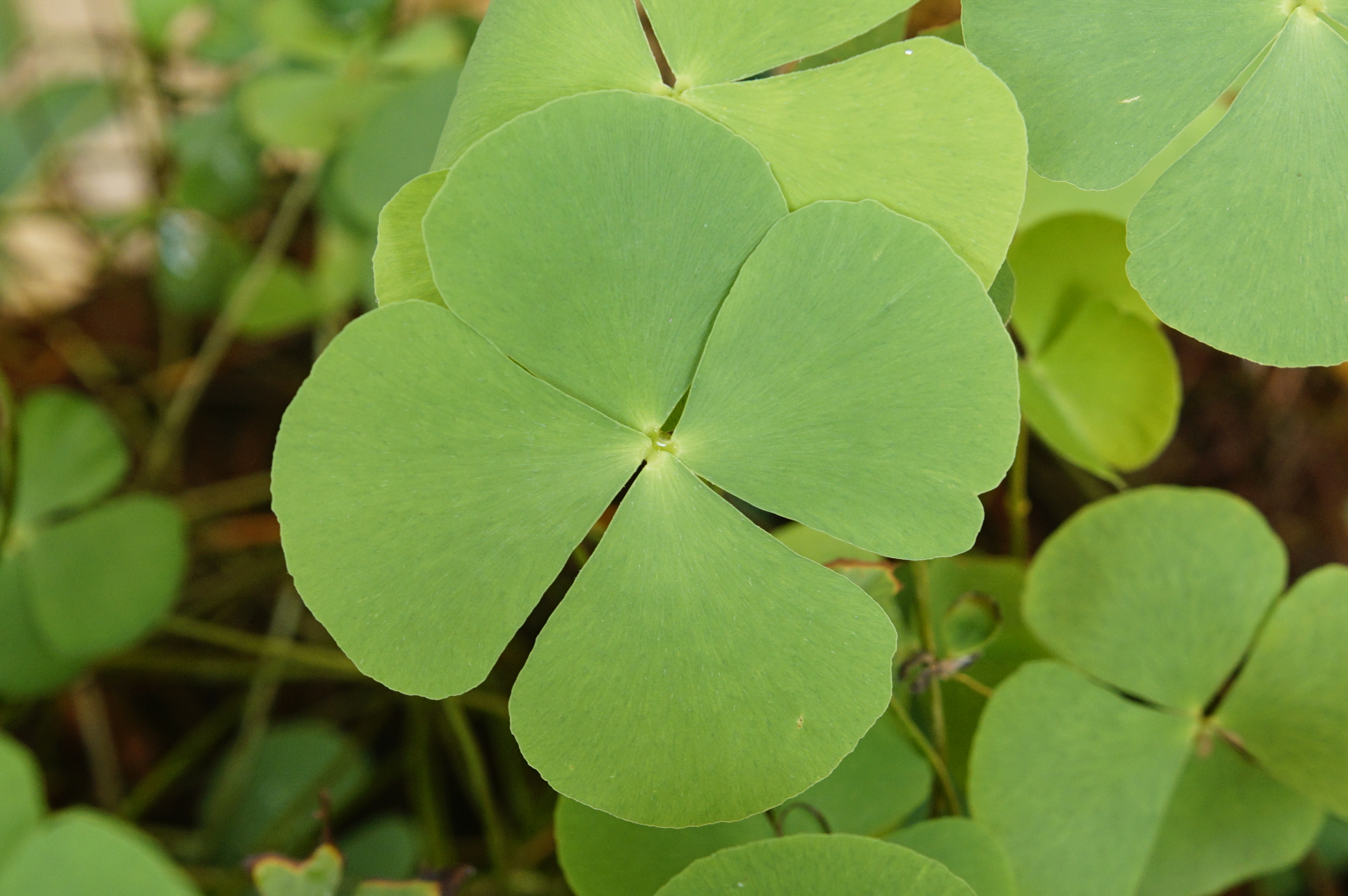

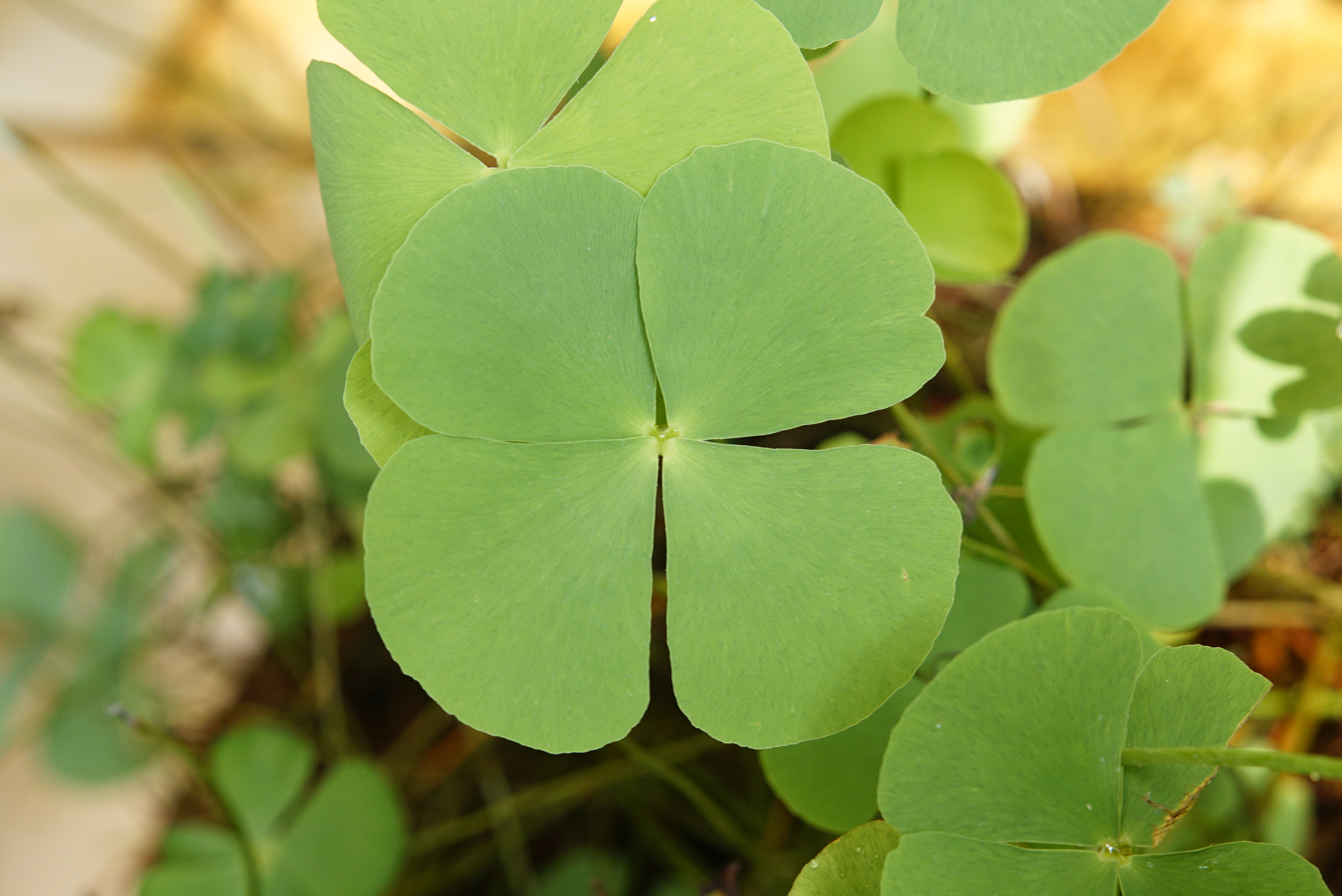

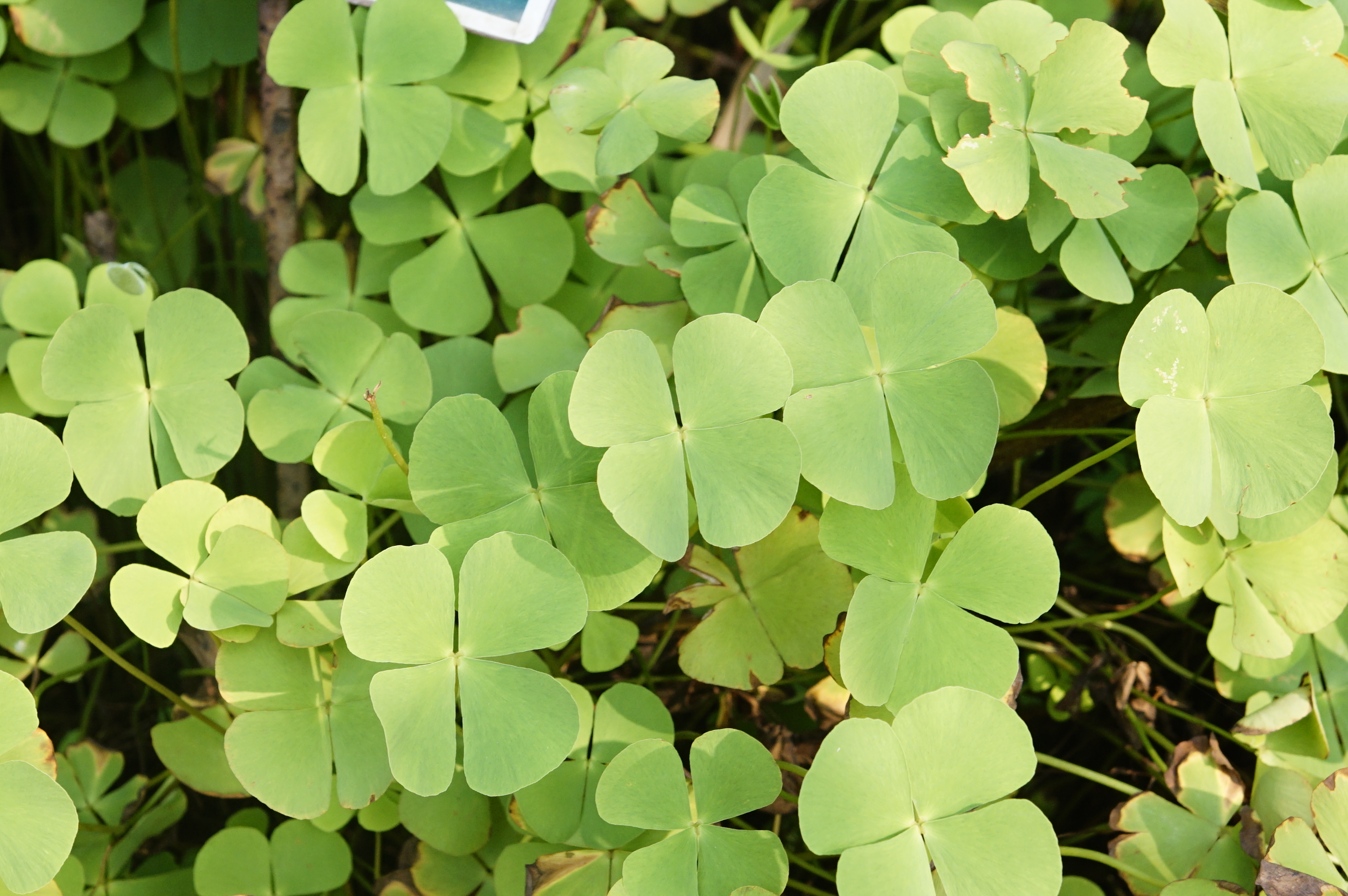

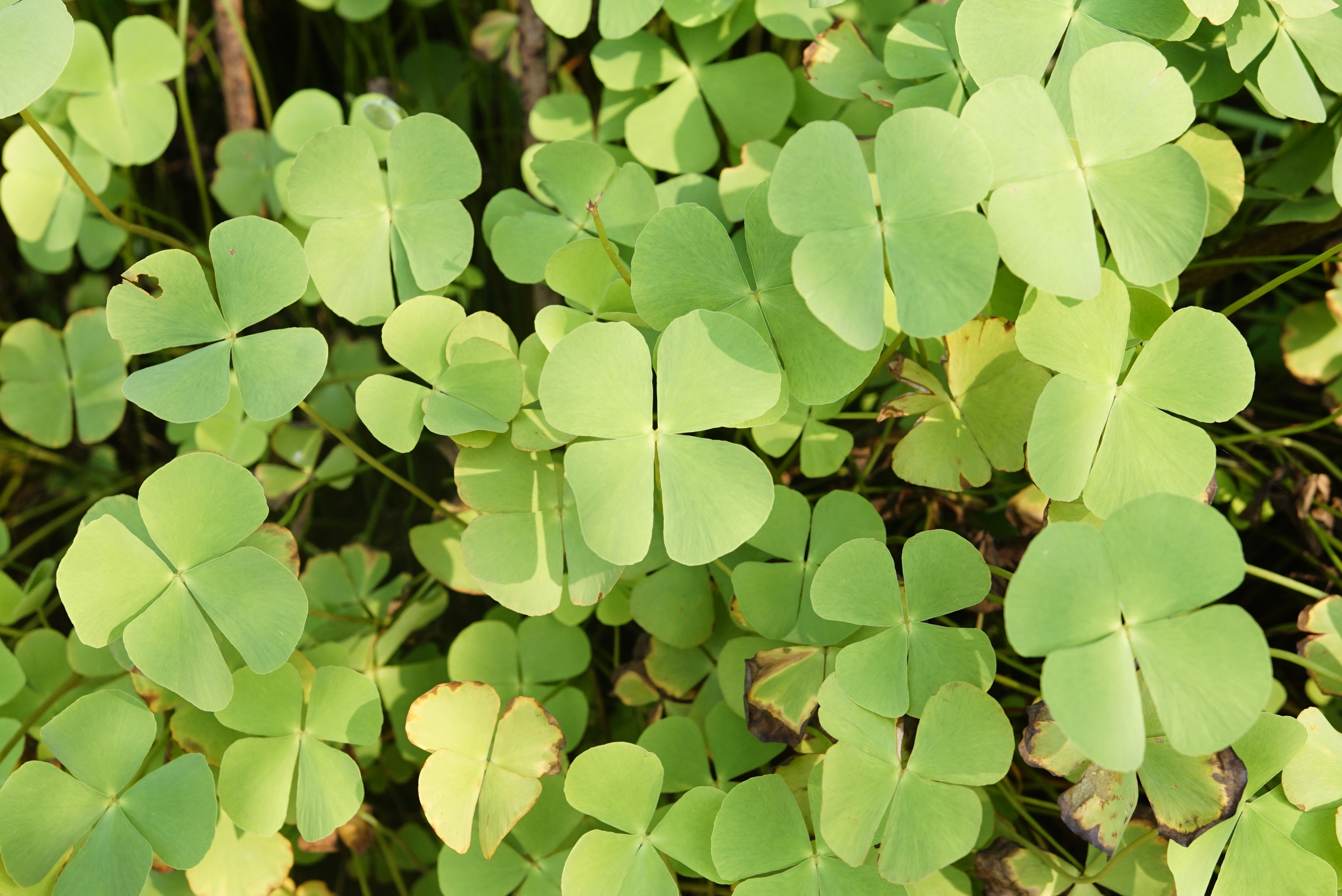

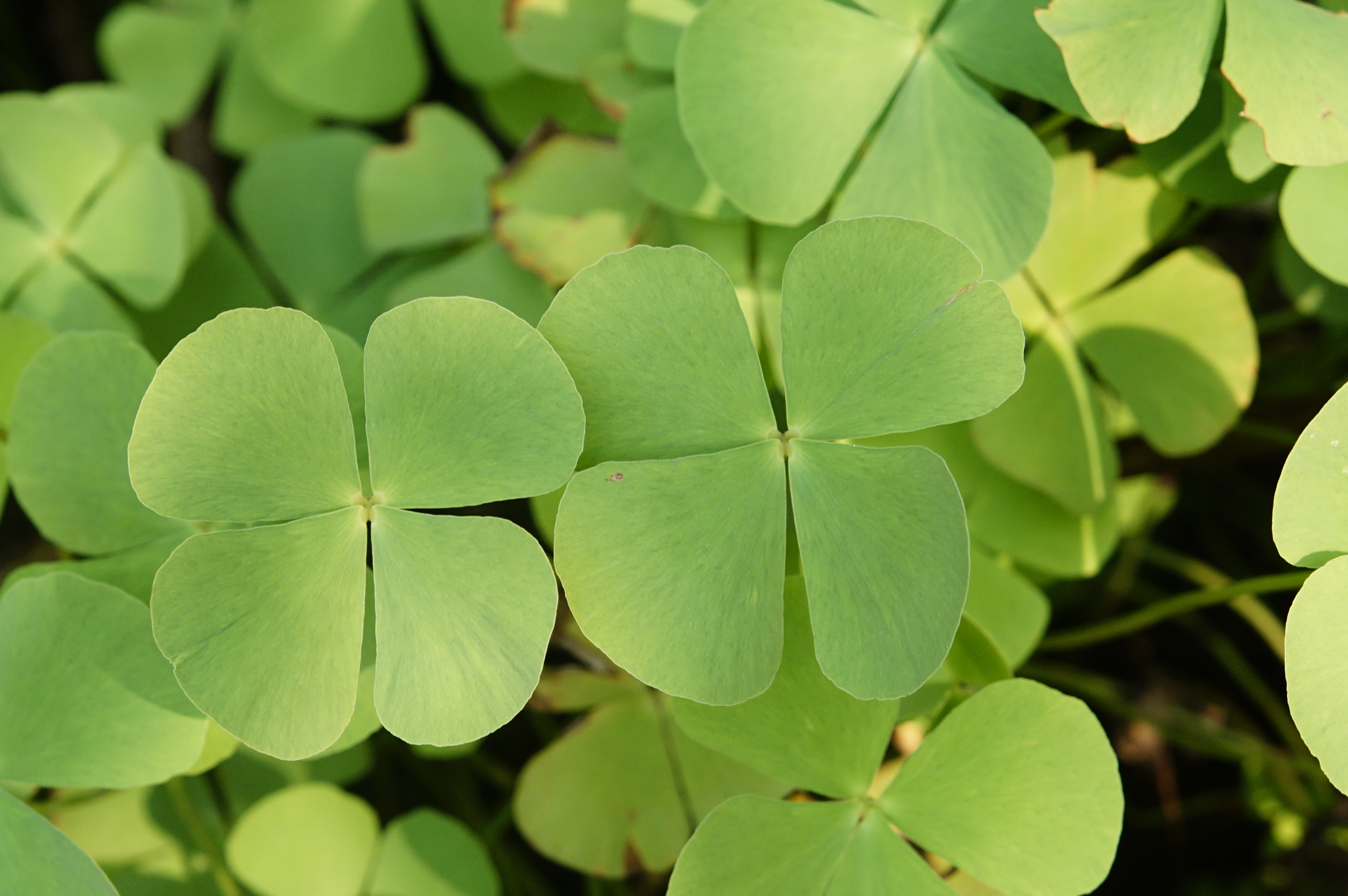

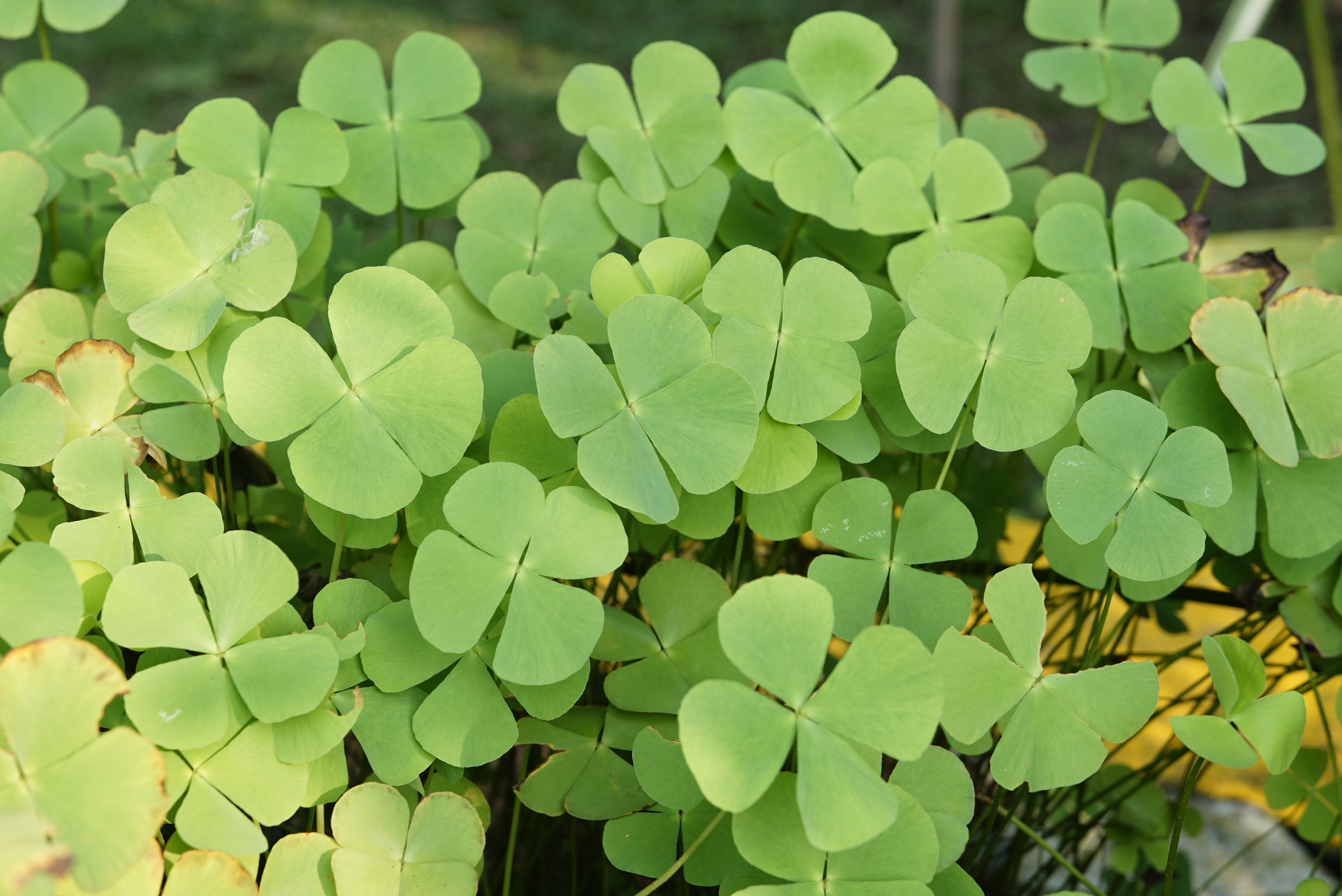

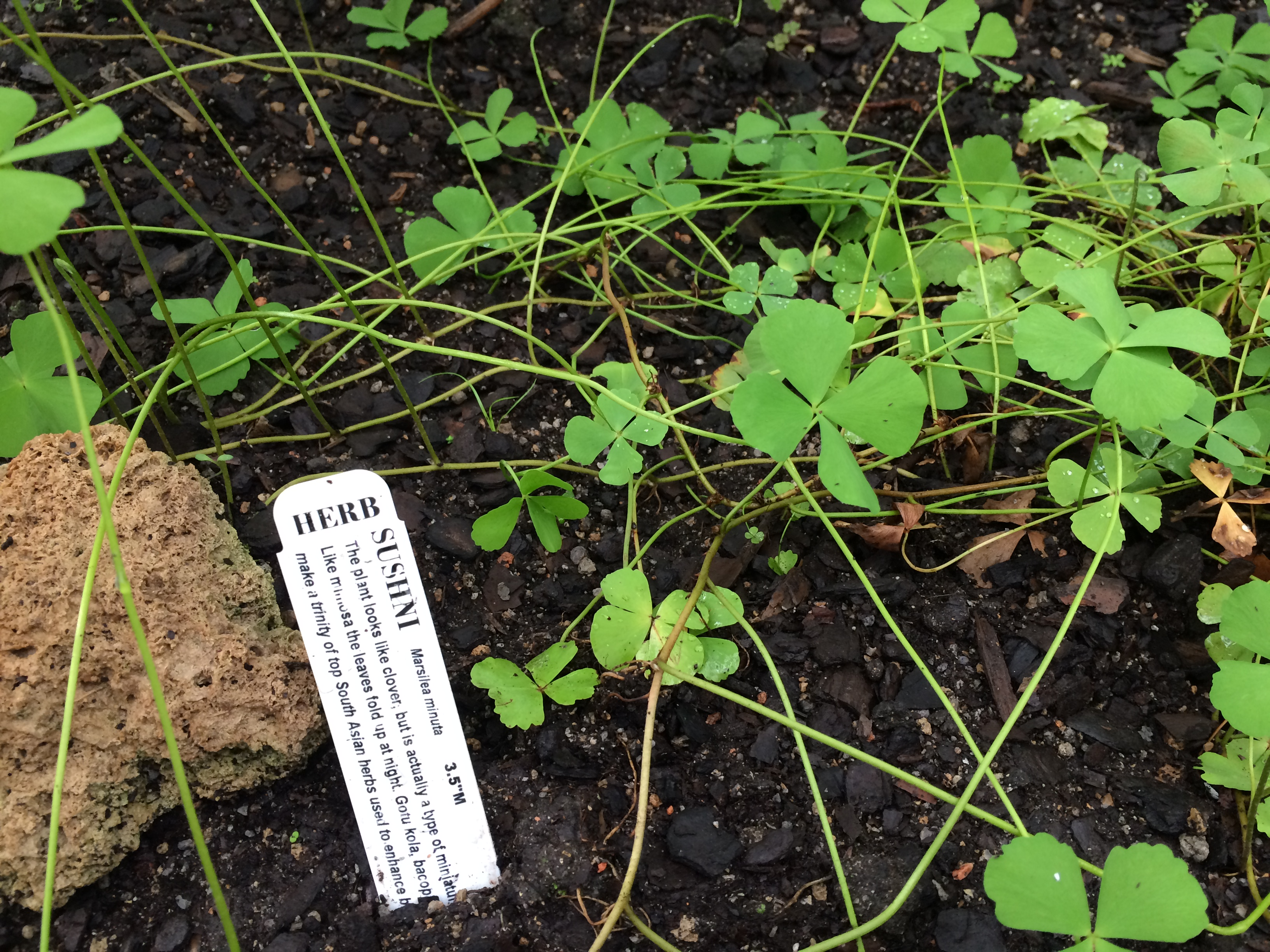

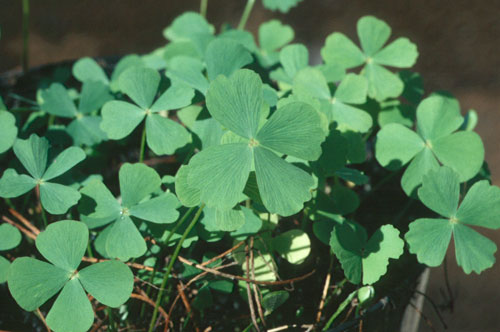
