= Semanggi =

Semanggi is a common name in Indonesia for two closely related species of aquatic ferns:

- In Javanese it can refer to Marsilea crenata
- In Indonesian it can refer to Marsilea minuta

Semanggi may also refer to:

- Semanggi shootings, two 1998 incidents
- Semanggi Interchange
