= Bush bread =

Seedcakes baked by Aboriginal Australians

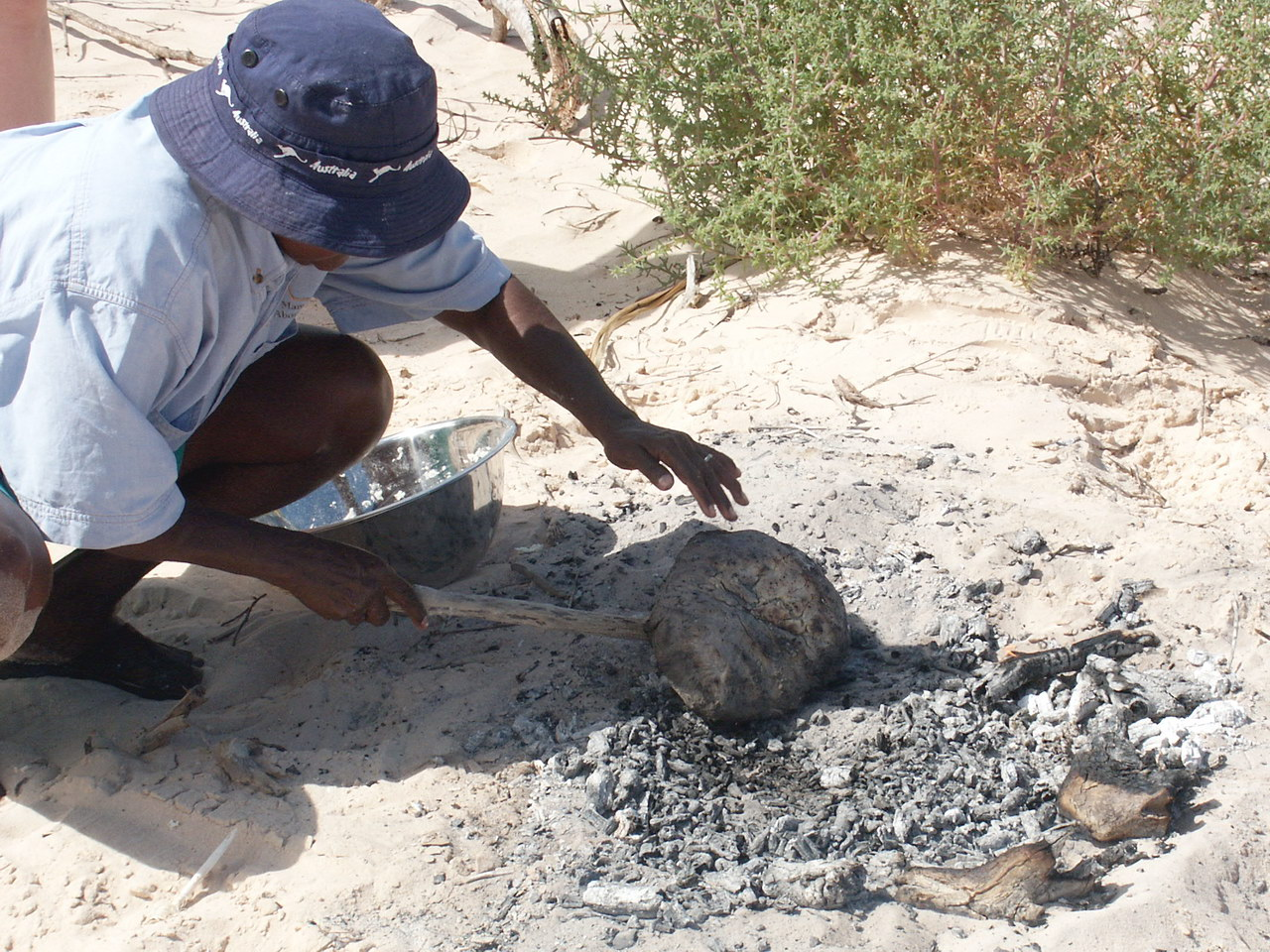
- Damper being prepared in hot coals
- Alternative names: Seedcakes
- Type: Bread
- Place of origin: Australia
- Region or state: Aboriginal
- Main ingredients: Flour (from various seeds), water

Bush bread, or seedcakes, refers to the bread made by Aboriginal Australians by crushing seeds into a dough that is then baked. The bread is high in protein and carbohydrate, and forms part of a balanced traditional diet. It is also sometimes referred to as damper, although damper is more commonly used to describe the bread made by non-Indigenous people.

With the arrival of Europeans and pre-milled white flour, this bread-making process has almost disappeared (although women were still recorded to be making seedcakes in Central Australia in the 1970s). The tradition of cooking bread in hot coals continues today.

Bread-making was a woman's task. It was generally carried out by several women at once, due to its labour-intensive nature. It involved collecting seasonal grains, legumes, roots or nuts, and preparing these into flour and then dough, or directly into a dough. One of the traditional ingredients was the seeds of kangaroo grass.

== Bread-making from seeds ==
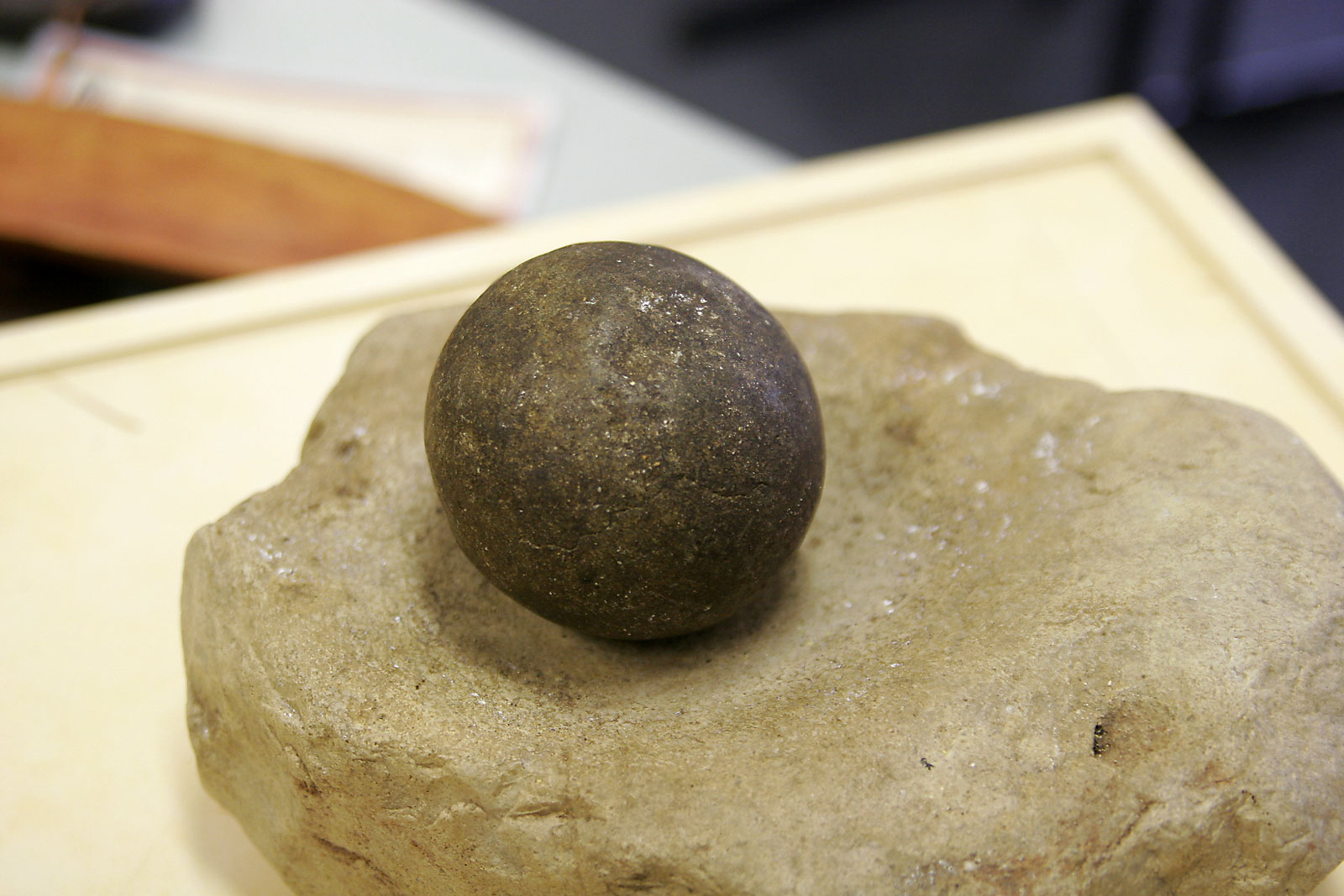
An Aboriginal millstone, vital in making flour or pastes for bread. Some Aboriginal groups call it "mother and child".

=== Collecting the seed ===
Seeds varied depending on the time of year and the area in Australia that the people lived. In Central Australia, native millet (Panicum decompositum; Panicum australiense) and spinifex (Triodia) were commonly used. Wattleseed could also be used in the flour mix.

Women harvested the fully ripe, dry seeds of the plant by beating the grass (or pod-laden trees in the case of wattleseed) with sticks to dislodge the seeds. Some species were eaten at the green stage and, when ground, would produce a juice at the side of the millstone, which was drunk directly.

Some seeds (such as the seed of acacia) need to be heated, hulled and then ground dry, while others (such as those of grasses) can be ground with water.

In the Kimberley region of Western Australia, women observed that, after the dry season, many seeds would be gathered around the opening of harvester ants' nests. The ants had effectively collected and husked the seed for them, and they were able to collect this seed, making the women's job much easier. After allowing the grain to dry, the women could begin to prepare the flour.

=== Other seeds used ===
Pigwig (Portulaca oleracea), prickly wattle (Acacia victoriae), mulga (Acacia aneura), dead finish seed (Acacia tetragonophylla), and bush bean (Vincetoxicum lineare) are also occasionally used in the making of bush bread.

=== Making the flour ===
After the grain was collected, it needed to be winnowed, which was done using the coolamon, the multi-purpose carrying vessel. Sometimes it needed to be winnowed several times.

Once the grain was winnowed, it was ground using a millstone, to create flour. Millstones have been discovered which have proven to be as old as 50,000 years. The flour was then mixed with water to make a dough and placed in hot ashes for baking. The results could be small buns, today referred to as johnny cakes, or a large loaf, known today as damper. Damper appears to be a mix of this traditional style of bread-making and European-style bread-making.

The dough could also be eaten raw. Cooking was a good way to prepare the bread if the group was about to travel for some time.

== Bread-making from other plant products ==
Bread could also be made from roots and corms of plants. In the Top End of Australia, people such as the Yolngu used the lotus root and wild taro. These were ground, then mixed to a paste to make bread.

Water lily seed bread was also common in the Top End. The two species of water lily used were Nelumbo nucifera and Nymphaea macrosperma. During the early part of the dry season, water lilies were an important part of the diet, with seed pods eaten raw or ground into paste.

Women had expert knowledge of how to detoxify certain plant foods. The seeds of the cycad palm, Cycas media, are highly carcinogenic when raw, and require elaborate treatment including shelling, crushing, leaching in running water for up to five days, then cooking. After this they are made into small loaves, which can keep for a number of weeks.

In Queensland, the people of the Mount Tamborine area used the bunya pine cone (bunya nut), endemic to the area, to make bread in this way.

== Burke and Wills ==
Ill-fated explorers Burke and Wills survived on bush bread for some time after they ran out of rations due to the death of their camels. The Yandruwandha people at Cooper Creek gave them fish, beans called padlu, and bread made from the ground sporocarps of the ngardu (nardoo) plant (Marsilea drummondii).

There is some evidence that the nardoo contributed to their deaths. Wills' last journal entry includes the following:

...starvation on nardoo is by no means very unpleasant, but for the weakness one feels, and the utter inability to move oneself, for as far as appetite is concerned, it gives me the greatest satisfaction. Certainly, fat and sugar would be more to one's taste, in fact, those seem to me to be the great stand by for one in this extraordinary continent; not that I mean to depreciate the farinacious food, but the want of sugar and fat in all substances obtainable here is so great that they become almost valueless to us as articles of food, without the addition of something else...

It is possible that the explorers, in preparing the bread themselves, were not preparing it in the traditional way of the Aboriginal people, which may have involved soaking seeds prior to grinding in order to remove the enzyme thiaminase, which depletes the body of vitamin B_{1}. It is therefore believed that the deaths of Burke and Wills resulted in part from the vitamin deficiency disease beri-beri. However, other research suggests that scurvy (vitamin C deficiency) and environmental factors also contributed to their deaths.
