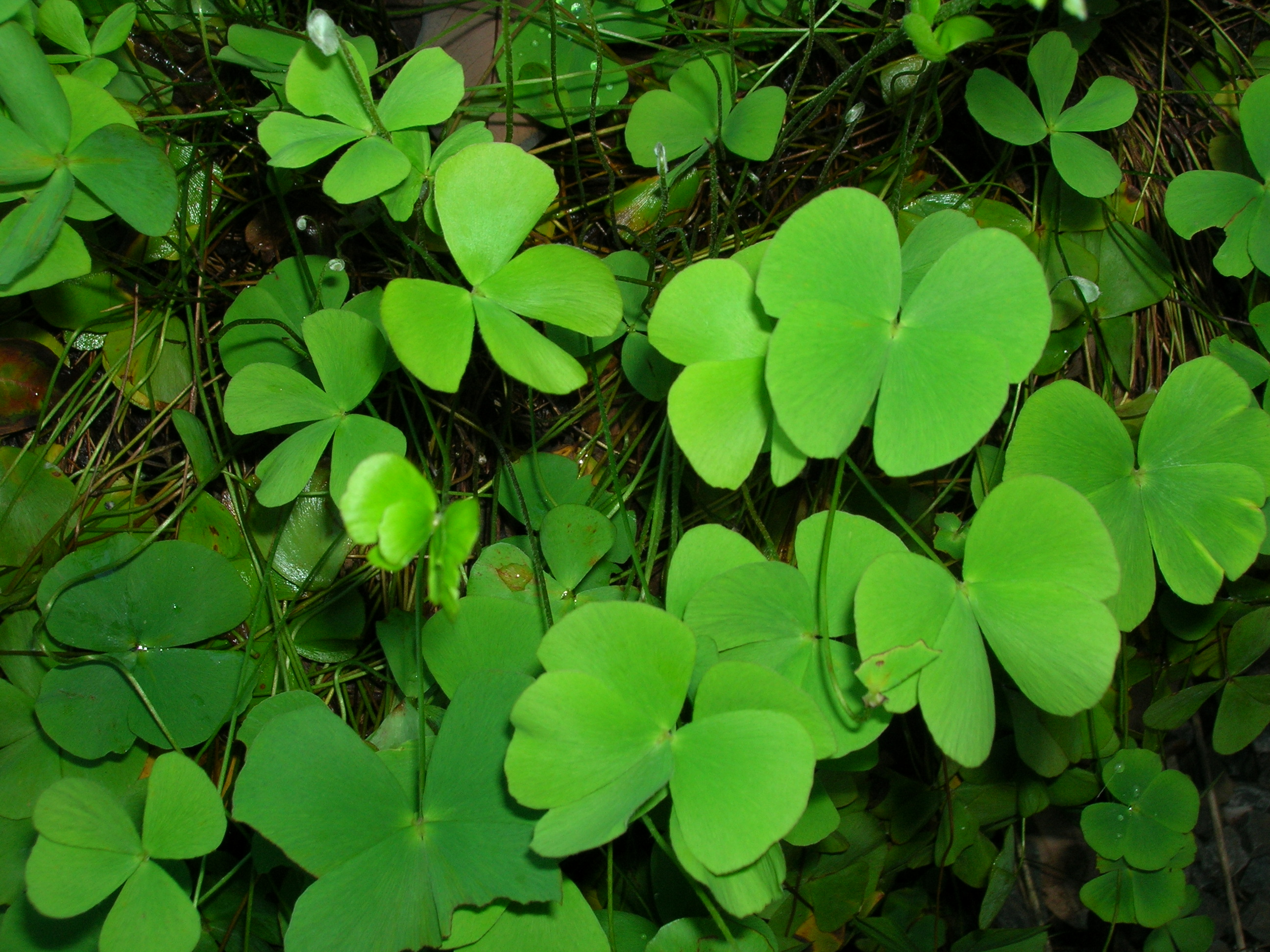

Conservation status
- Endangered (IUCN 3.1)

- Endangered (ESA)

Scientific classification
- Kingdom: Plantae
- Clade: Tracheophytes
- Division: Polypodiophyta
- Class: Polypodiopsida
- Order: Salviniales
- Family: Marsileaceae
- Genus: Marsilea
- Species: M. villosa

Binomial name
- Marsilea villosa Kaulf.

= Marsilea villosa =

Species of fern

Marsilea villosa, the ʻihiʻihi (Hawaiian) or villous waterclover (English), is a species of fern that is endemic to the islands of Oʻahu, Molokaʻi and Niʻihau in Hawaii. It is found exclusively in areas that experience periodic flooding and become ephemeral pools within low elevation dry forests and shrublands. Standing water allows the sporocarp to open and release spores. It also enables the resulting sperm to swim toward and fertilize female ova. For new plants to become established, the waters must subside. Sporocarps only form once the soil has dried to a certain level. Like other species in its genus, the leaves of M. villosa resemble those of a four-leaf clover.

== Description ==
This aquatic fern is notable due to its reminiscence of a four leaf clover, and its unique adaptations to its seasonal environment. The morphological features depend greatly on the current conditions. During periods of drought this species possesses a dormant rhizome that begins rapidly producing photosynthetic clover like leaves once the rainy season begins again. At the end of each leaf stalk ranging from 1-45cm, four leaflets are produced. In flooded conditions, the petioles lengthen to keep the leaflets afloat. At the base of the leaf stalks a hard sporocarp is formed once the rainy season comes to an end. The sporocarp is capable of laying dormant for extended periods of time. The name “villosa” describes the presence of fine hairs on this plant's leaves, rhizomes, and reproductive sporocarps. This plant’s growth habits vary from scattered clumps to dense mats.

== Reproduction ==
The reproductive cycle of Marsilea villosa is entirely dependent on environmental conditions, requiring both a dry season and a wet season for the full transition from sporophyte to gametophyte. The dry season allows for the formation and maturation of the reproductive sporocarp. These sporocarps protect the megaspores and microspores until the onset of the next rainy season, when fertilization can occur. This adaptation allows for survival through prolonged drought periods. With the arrival of the rainy season, the hard exterior of the sporocarp softens and opens. The spores are then released and fertilization takes place in standing water. Standing water is essential because the male (sperm) must be able to swim to the female spore (egg) for successful fertilization.

== Distribution ==
This species is endemic to the islands of Hawai'i. Its unique characteristics restrict it to areas that experience periodic flooding and are low in elevation. This species was originally discovered on O'ahu and later reported to be found on Moloka’i and Ni’ihau. The only surviving populations are on O'ahu and Moloka’i. M. villosa was last observed on Ni'ihau in 1949.

== Habitat ==
This perennial fern requires a unique set of habitat characteristics including periods of drought and flooding to be able to successfully reproduce. These areas generally consist of small depressions of clay soil in low elevations that can collect and hold water for extended periods. These ephemeral pools provide a temporary flood and drought period that are both critical to the aquatic fern’s reproductive cycle.

== Conservation ==
Fewer than 2,000 individual plants exist in four remaining populations. The plant was federally listed as an endangered species in 1992. The primary threat to Marsilea villosa and the main cause of its decline is habitat destruction resulting from human development and invasive species. Much of the original habitat degradation occurred due to the drainage of ponds and the introduction of grazing animals such as cattle, sheep, and goats. During the dry season, invasive species, particularly fast growing grasses, are able to quickly take over causing a sharp decline in M. villosa populations while the species lies dormant awaiting the next flood. Despite these challenges, M. villosa possesses adaptations that allow it to withstand harsh environmental conditions, giving it the potential to recover when favorable conditions return. Several conservation efforts have been implemented to protect the remaining populations. These efforts include removing grazing animals and invasive plant species, constructing protective barriers around existing populations, and modifying development plans for condominiums and golf courses to reduce impacts on the species. Additionally, numerous studies have examined ecological factors affecting M. villosa and have supported the development of restoration techniques to help manage and recover its populations.
