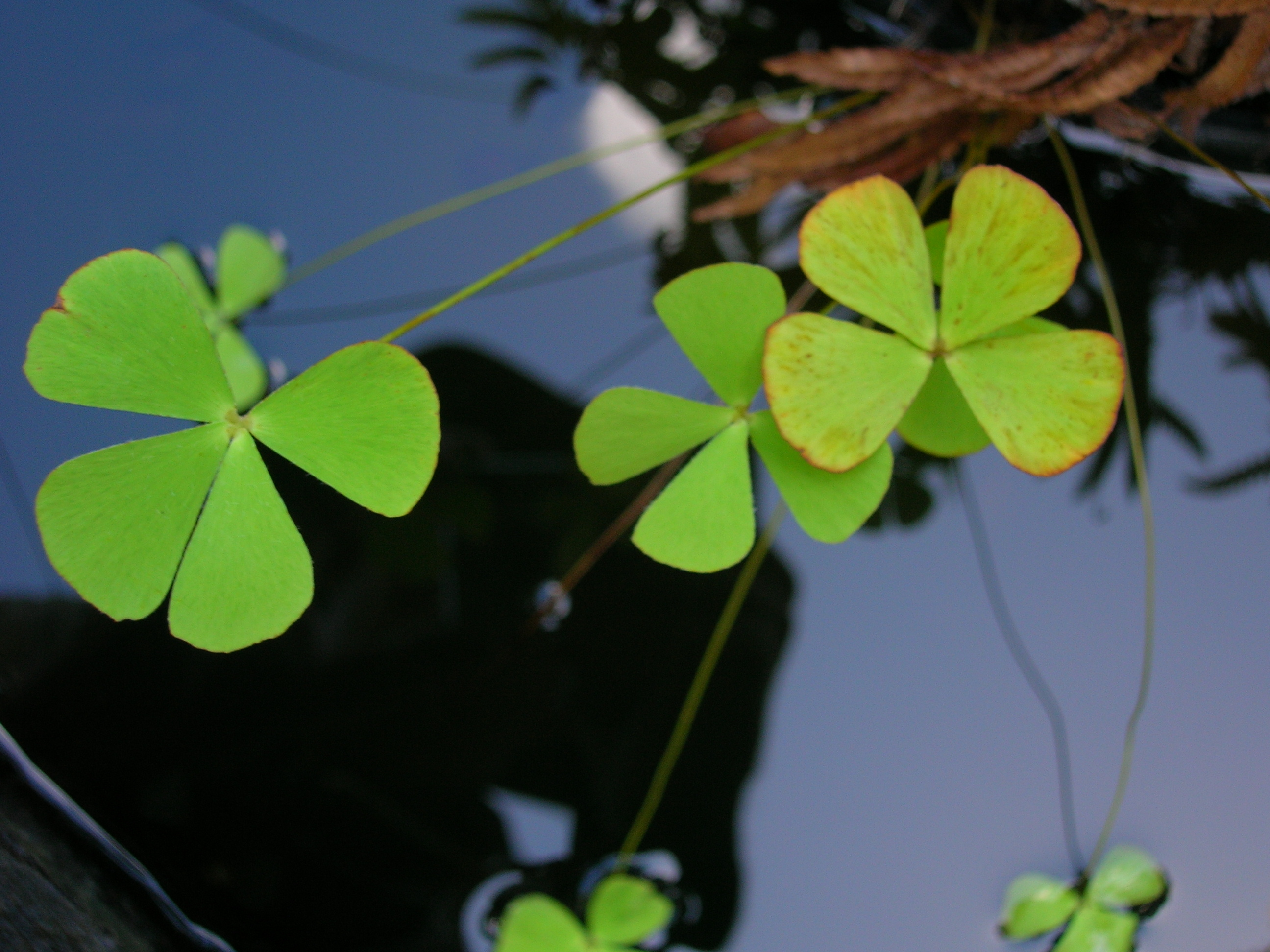
- Marsilea villosa

Scientific classification
- Kingdom: Plantae
- Clade: Tracheophytes
- Division: Polypodiophyta
- Class: Polypodiopsida
- Order: Salviniales
- Family: Marsileaceae
- Genus: Marsilea; L.

Type species
- Marsilea quadrifolia L.

Species
- See text

Synonyms
- Lemma Juss. ex Adans. Spheroidea Dulac; Zaluzianskia Neck.

= Marsilea =

Genus of aquatic plants

Marsilea is a genus of approximately 65 species of aquatic ferns of the family Marsileaceae. The name honours Italian naturalist Luigi Ferdinando Marsili (1656–1730).

These small plants are of unusual appearance and do not resemble common ferns. Common names include water clover, four-leaf clover, and clover fern because of the long-stalked leaves which have four clover-like lobes and are present either above water or submerged; however, these plants are not actual clovers (genus Trifolium).

The sporocarps of some Australian species are very drought-resistant, surviving up to 100 years in dry conditions. On wetting, the gelatinous interior of the sporocarp swells, splitting it and releasing a worm-like mass that carries sori, eventually leading to germination of spores and fertilization.

== Uses ==
=== As food ===
Sporocarps of some Australian species such as Marsilea drummondii are edible and have been eaten by Aborigines and early white settlers, who knew it under the name ngardu or nardoo. Parts of Marsilea drummondii contain an enzyme which destroys thiamine (vitamin B_{1}), leading to brain damage in sheep and horses. During floods in the Gwydir River basin 2,200 sheep died after eating nardoo. Three-quarters of the sheep that were affected did however respond to thiamine injections. Thiamine deficiency from incorrectly prepared nardoo likely resulted in the starvation and death of Burke and Wills.

The leaves of Marsilea crenata are part of the East Javanese cuisine of Indonesia, especially in the city of Surabaya. It is called Pecel Semanggi and is served with spicy peanut and sweet potato sauce.

=== Ornamental ===
A few species in the genus, such as Marsilea crenata, Marsilea exarata, Marsilea hirsuta, and Marsilea quadrifolia, are grown in aquaria.

=== Formerly placed here ===
- Salvinia natans (L.) All. (as M. natans L.)

== Phylogeny ==
Molecular phylogenetic analysis of the genus Marsilea shows the following tree. This tree indicates that M. crenata is the same species (or a subspecies) of M. minuta, and possibly M. fadeniana also. Additionally, this analysis contradicts reports that M. polycarpa is a synonym for M. minuta.

Nagalingum et al. 2007

- - Group I
    - Clemys subgroup
      - M. crotophora
      - M. polycarpa
    - Mutica subgroup
      M. mutica
  - Group II
    - - Macrocarpa subgroup
        - M. aegyptiatica
        - M. botryocarpa
        - M. ephippiocarpa
        - M. farinosa
        - M. macrocarpa
        - - M. schelpiana
          - M. vera
          - M. villifolia
      - Nubica subgroup
        - M. nubica (Botswana)
        - M. nubica (Nigeria)
    - - Capensis subgroup
        - M. distorta
        - - M. capensis
          - M. gibba
    - - Nodorhizae subgroup
        - - - M. ancyclopoda
            - - M. macropoda
              - - M. nashii (Grand Turk Island)
                - M. nashii (West Indies)
          - - - M. oligospora
              - M. vestita
            - M. villosa
        - M. mollis
      - Marsilea subgroup
        - - - M. angustifolia
            - M. drummondii
          - M. minuta‑crenata‑ fadeniana complex
            - - - - - M. crenata (Indonesia)
                    - M. crenata (Thailand)
                  - M. minuta (India)
                - M. minuta (Myanmar)
              - M. minuta (Africa)
            - M. fadeniana
        - M. quadrifolia

Fern Tree of Life

- - - section Clemys
      - M. mutica Mett. (Large-leaved nardoo)
      - - M. scalaripes D.M. Johnson
        - - M. crotophora D.M. Johnson
          - - M. deflexa A.Braun
            - M. polycarpa Hooker & Greville
  - - - section Nodorhizae
        - M. mollis B.L. Rob. & Fernald (Chihuahuan water clover)
        - - M. ancyclopoda A.Braun (Tropical Water Clover)
          - - - M. macropoda Engelm. ex A.Braun (Bigfoot water clover)
              - M. nashii Underwood
            - - M. villosa Kaulf. (ʻIhiʻihi) (Hawaii) (ʻIhiʻihi)
              - - M. oligospora Goodd.
                - M. vestita Hook. & Grev. (Hairy Water Clover)
    - - M. macrocarpa species‑group
        - - M. schelpeana Launert
          - - M. owambo Doweld
            - M. villifolia Brem. & Oberm. ex Alston & Schelpe
        - - - M. aegyptica Willd.
            - M. ephippiocarpa Alston
          - - M. farinosa Launert
            - - M. botryocarpa Ballard
              - M. macrocarpa C.Presl
      - section Marsilea
        - M. nubica A.Braun
        - - - - M. capensis A.Braun
              - M. gibba Brown
            - - M. coromandelina Willd.
              - M. distorta A.Braun
          - - M. quadrifolia L. (European Water Clover)
            - - - M. fadeniana Launert
                - - M. crenata C.Presl
                  - M. minuta L. (Dwarf Water Clover)
              - - M. strigosa Willdenow
                - - M. drummondii A.Braun (Common Nardoo)
                  - - M. hirsuta R. Br. (Rough water clover)
                    - - M. exarata Brown
                      - - M. costulifera Jones
                        - - M. angustifolia Brown
                          - M. azorica Launert & Paiva

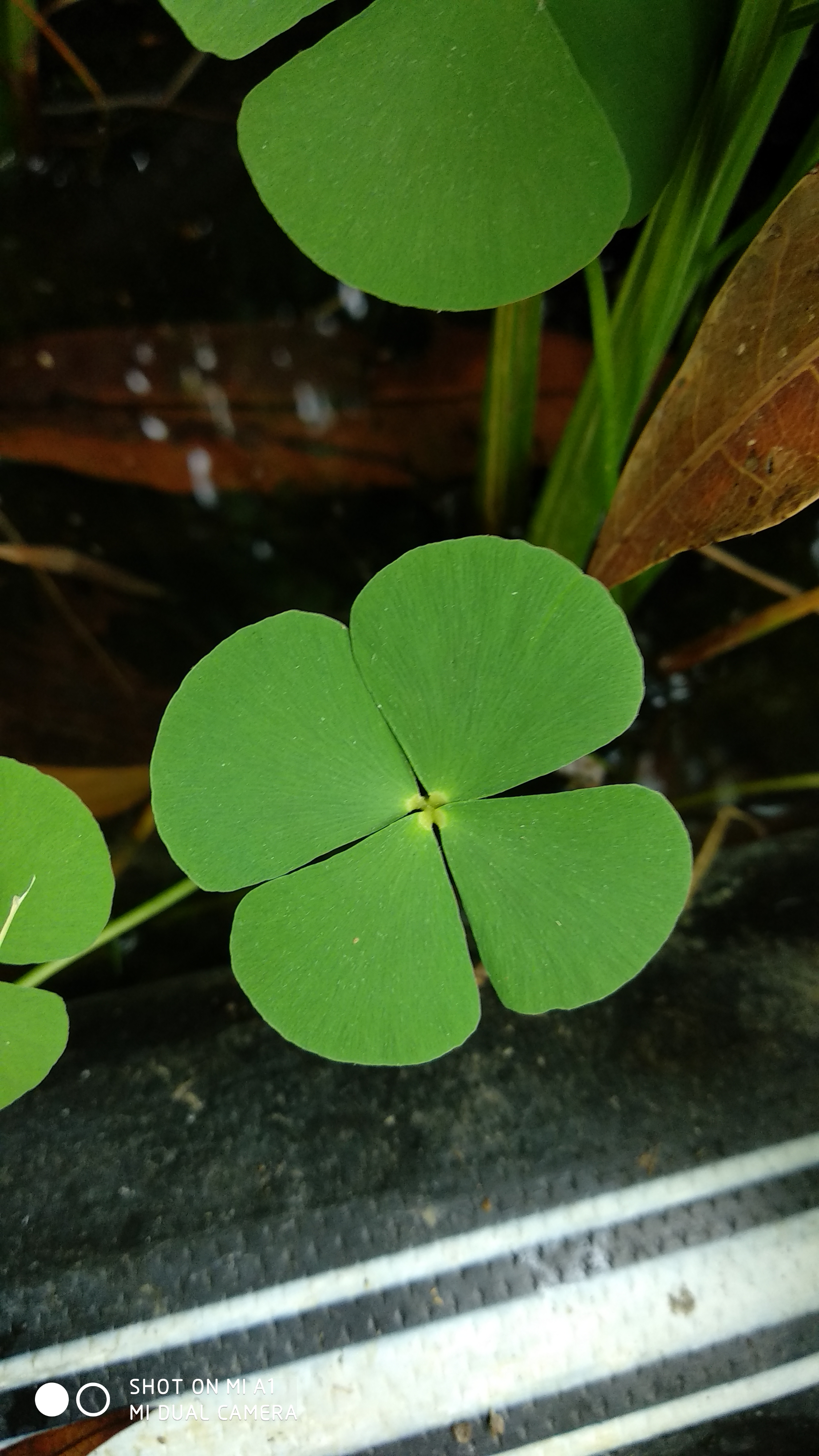

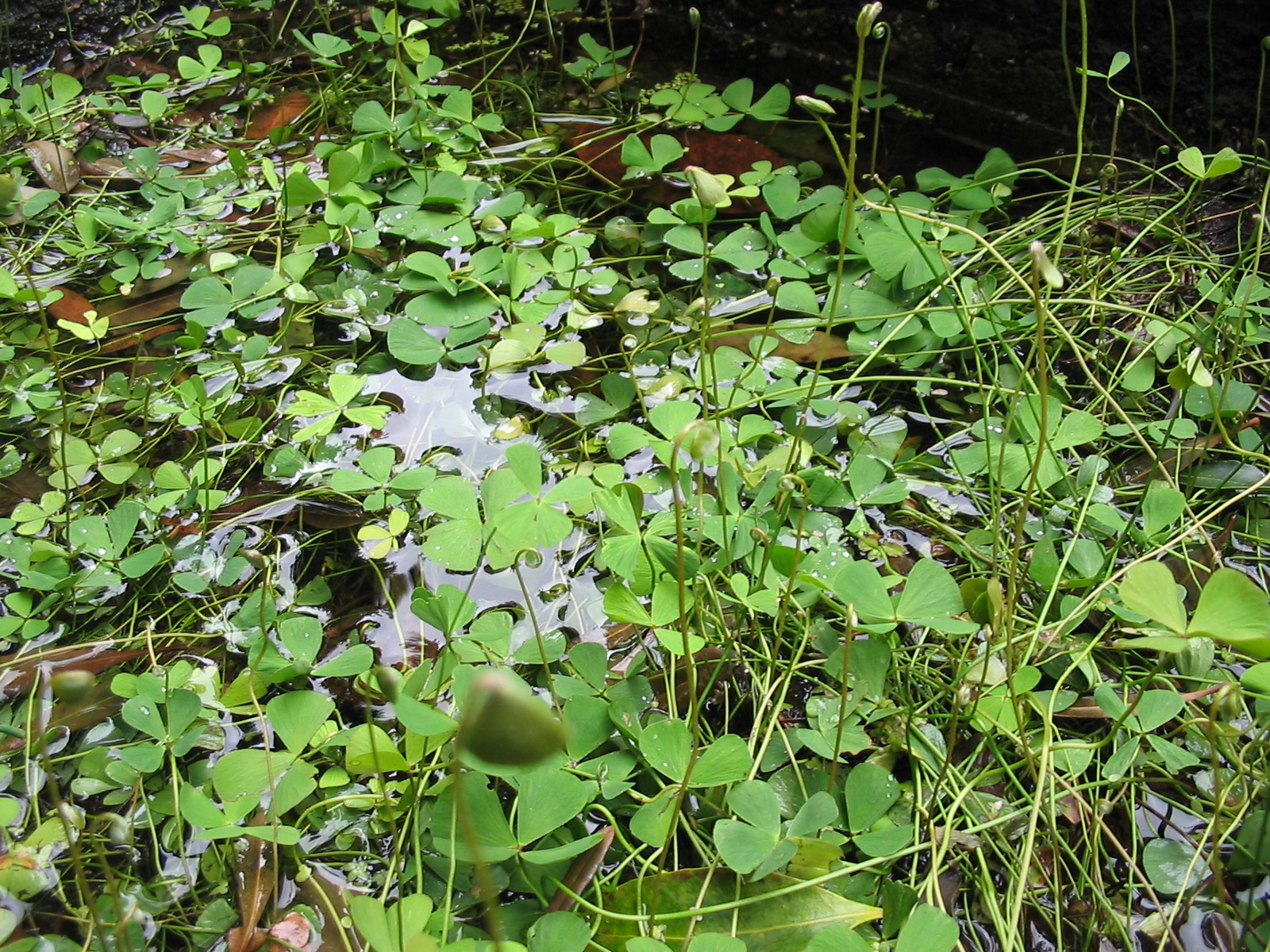
Marsilea hirsuta was introduced to the Azores but formerly thought to be an endemic species, M. azorica

Other species include:

- Marsilea aethiopica Launert
- Marsilea apposita Launert
- Marsilea batardae Launen
- Marsilea burchellii A.Braun
- Marsilea condensata Bak.
- Marsilea cryptocarpa Albr. & Chinnock
- Marsilea fenestrata Launert
- Marsilea globulosa Bouchart
- Marsilea hickenii Herter
- Marsilea latzii Jones
- Marsilea megalomanica Launert
- Marsilea pyriformis Bouchart
- Marsilea quadrata Brown
- Marsilea ×subangulata Brown
- Marsilea subterranea Leprieur
- Marsilea unicornis Launert
- Marsilea vera Launert

== See also ==
- Bush bread
