= Pepperwort =

Pepperwort is a common name for two different plants:

- Plants in the species Lepidium
- Marsilea minuta
