= Marsilea ancyclopoda =

Tropical water clover

Scientific classification
- Kingdom: Plantae
- Clade: Tracheophytes
- Division: Polypodiophyta
- Class: Polypodiopsida
- Order: Salviniales
- Family: Marsileaceae
- Genus: Marsilea
- Species: M. ancyclopoda

Binomial name
- Marsilea ancyclopoda A.Braun

Species of aquatic plant

Marsilea ancyclopoda, common name tropical water clover, is a plant species native to the warmer parts of the Western Hemisphere. It is widely distributed through Latin America from Mexico to Argentina, as well as from the West Indies. In the United States, it has been reported only from Florida, southern New Mexico, Puerto Rico and the Virgin Islands.

Marsilea ancyclopoda is a floating aquatic herb forming dense colonies on the surface of the water. Petioles are up to 18 cm long, densely pubescent. Pinnae (leaflets) are 4, palmately arranged like Trifolium, up to 17 mm across and about the same distance long. Sporocarps are nodding, below the level of the stems (this being the only species in the genus with this character), covered with a pelt of shaggy hairs.
