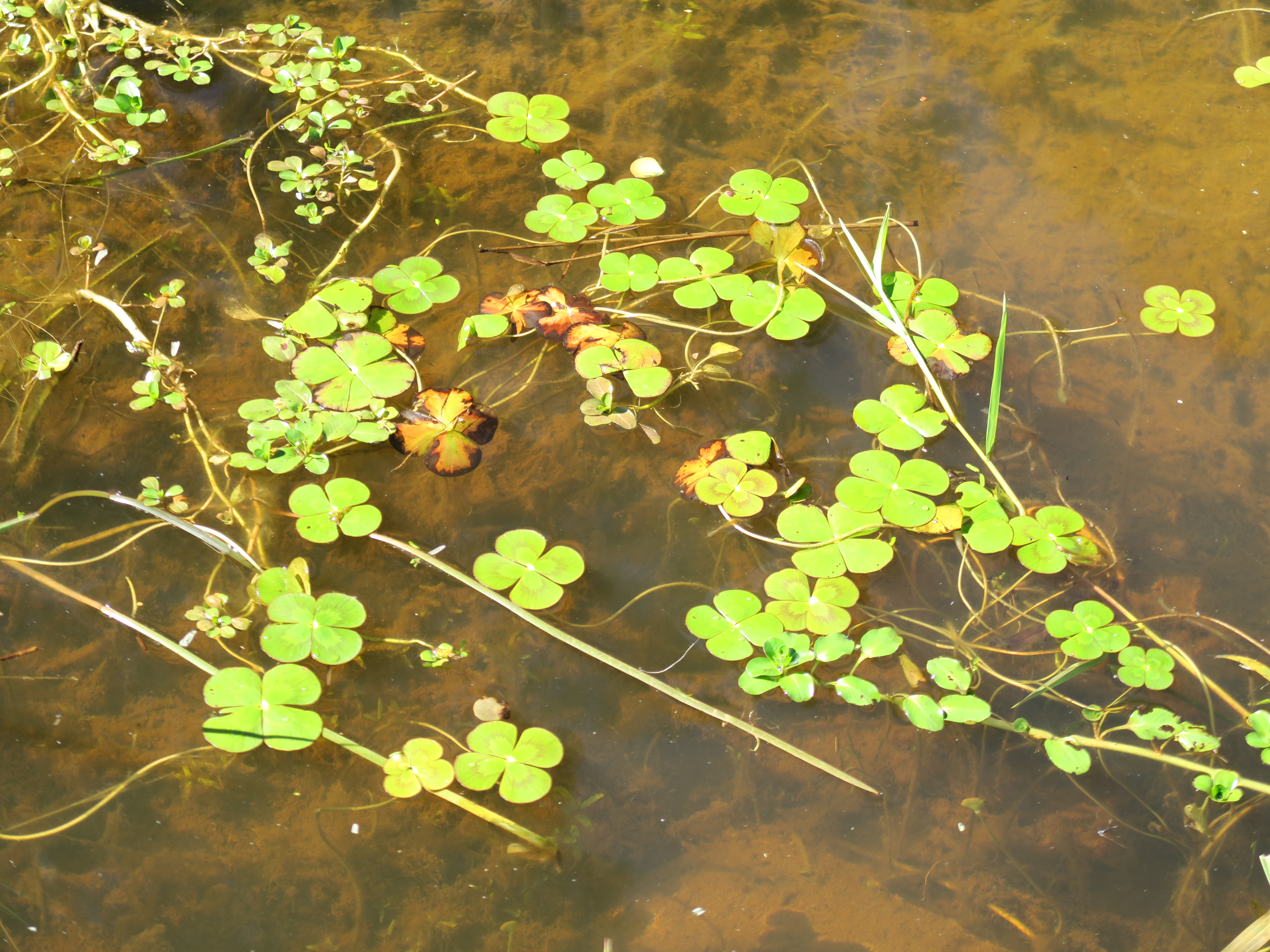
- Large-leaved nardoo

Scientific classification
- Kingdom: Plantae
- Clade: Embryophytes
- Clade: Tracheophytes
- Division: Polypodiophyta
- Class: Polypodiopsida
- Order: Salviniales
- Family: Marsileaceae
- Genus: Marsilea
- Species: M. mutica

Binomial name
- Marsilea mutica Mett.

= Marsilea mutica =

Species of waterfern

Marsilea mutica, known as the large-leaved nardoo, is a species of aquatic fern in the family Marsileaceae. A widespread species with wide clover like fronds, found in freshwater marshes, mostly in Australia and nearby New Caledonia. Seen in floating in deeper water than other ferns in the same genus.
