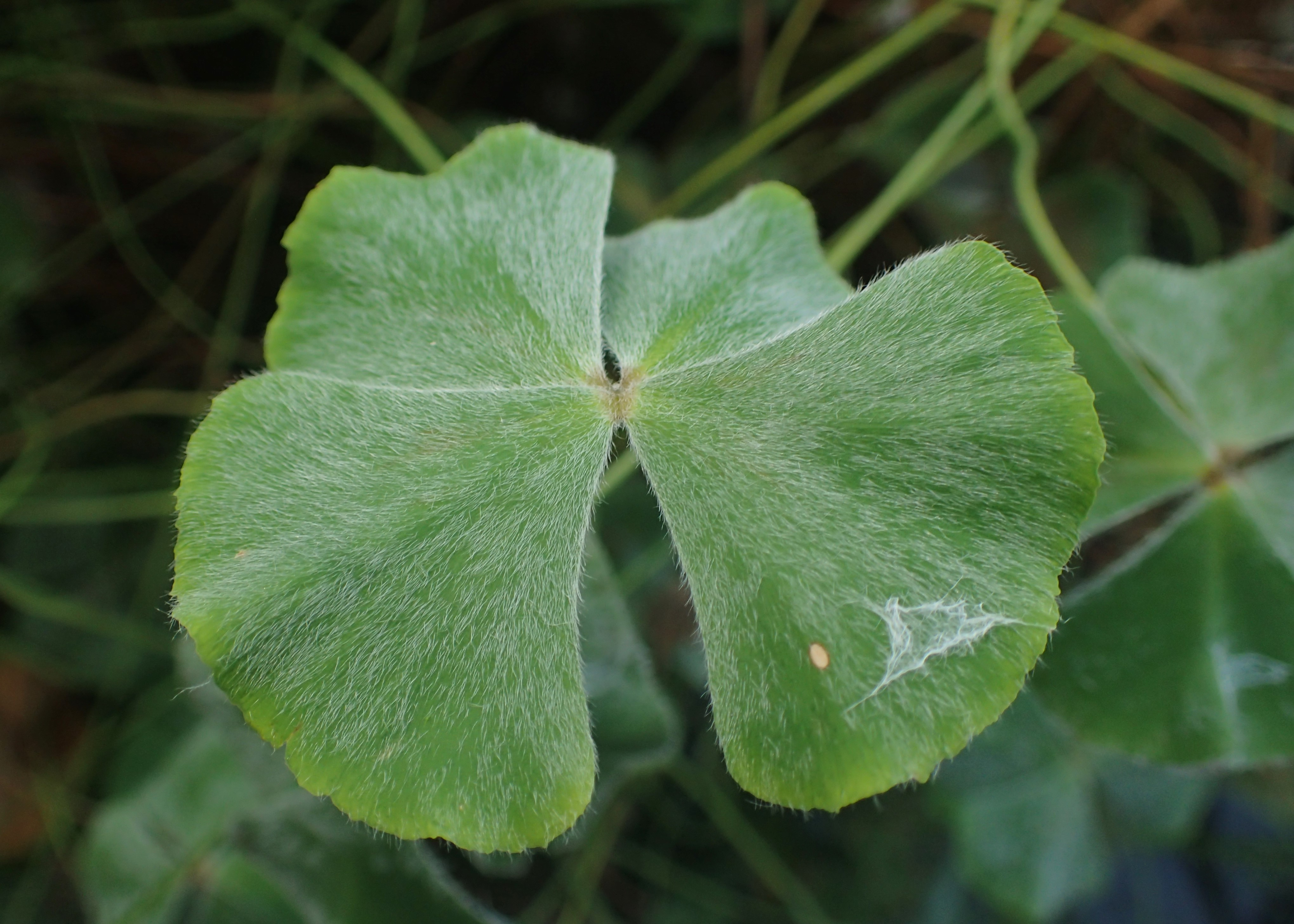
- Nardoo

Scientific classification
- Kingdom: Plantae
- Clade: Tracheophytes
- Division: Polypodiophyta
- Class: Polypodiopsida
- Order: Salviniales
- Family: Marsileaceae
- Genus: Marsilea
- Species: M. hirsuta

Binomial name
- Marsilea hirsuta R.Br.

= Marsilea hirsuta =

Species of fern

Marsilea hirsuta, known as the nardoo, is a species of aquatic fern in the family Marsileaceae. A widespread species with wide clover like fronds, found in flood plains and swamps in Australia. This plant was first mentioned in the scientific literature in 1810, in the Prodromus Florae Novae Hollandiae, authored by Scottish botanist, Robert Brown. One of the many plants listed with a type as "(J.T.) v.v.".
