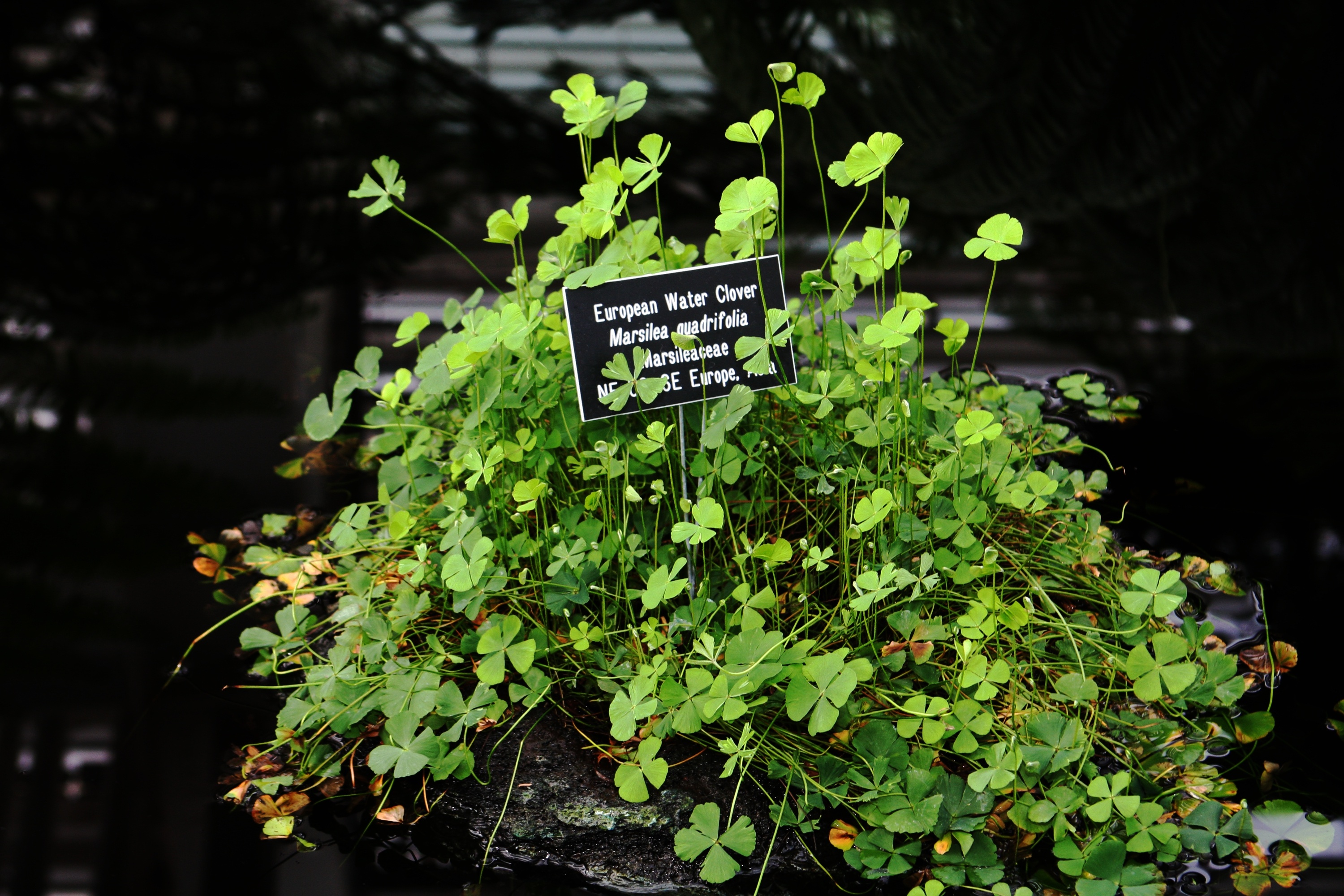

Conservation status
- Least Concern (IUCN 3.1)

- Secure (NatureServe)

Scientific classification
- Kingdom: Plantae
- Clade: Tracheophytes
- Division: Polypodiophyta
- Class: Polypodiopsida
- Order: Salviniales
- Family: Marsileaceae
- Genus: Marsilea
- Species: M. quadrifolia

Binomial name
- Marsilea quadrifolia L.

= Marsilea quadrifolia =

Species of plant

Marsilea quadrifolia is a herbaceous plant found naturally in central and southern Europe, Caucasia, western Siberia, Afghanistan, south-west India, China, Japan, and Vietnam, though it is considered a weed in some parts of the United States, where it has been well established in the northeast for over 100 years. Its common names include four leaf clover and European waterclover (USA), even though it is not a species of clover.

== Description ==
Aquatic fern bearing 4 parted leaf resembling 'Four-leaf clover' (Trifolium). Leaves floating in deep water or erect in shallow water or on land. Leaflets obdeltoid, to 3/4" long, glaucous, petioles to 8" long; Sporocarp (ferns) ellipsoid, to 3/16" long, dark brown, on stalks to 3/4" long, attached to base of petioles.

== Uses ==
In some places it has been used as food for more than 3000 years. The plant is said to be anti-inflammatory, diuretic, depurative, febrifuge and refrigerant. It is also used to treat snakebite and applied to abscesses.

== Cultivation ==
The plant prefers light (sandy) and medium (loamy) soils. It can grow in semi-shade (light woodland) or no shade. It requires moist or wet soil and can grow in water.

Marsilea quadrifolia can be grown as a potted plant, either just with soil kept wet, or semi-submerged, with fronds emergent from the water, or fully submerged, with the fronds floating on the surface of the water.

In the aquarium, water clover is grown fully submerged, usually in the foreground where it spreads by means of runners. It normally seems to be unfussy as to light and water conditions, and doesn't need a rich substrate.

Marsilea are very easy to germinate from their sporocarps. However, the sporocarps must be abraded, cracked, or have an edge sliced off before submerging them in water so that the water can penetrate to swell the tissues, and germination is infrared-light dependent. Full sunlight is fine for this purpose.
