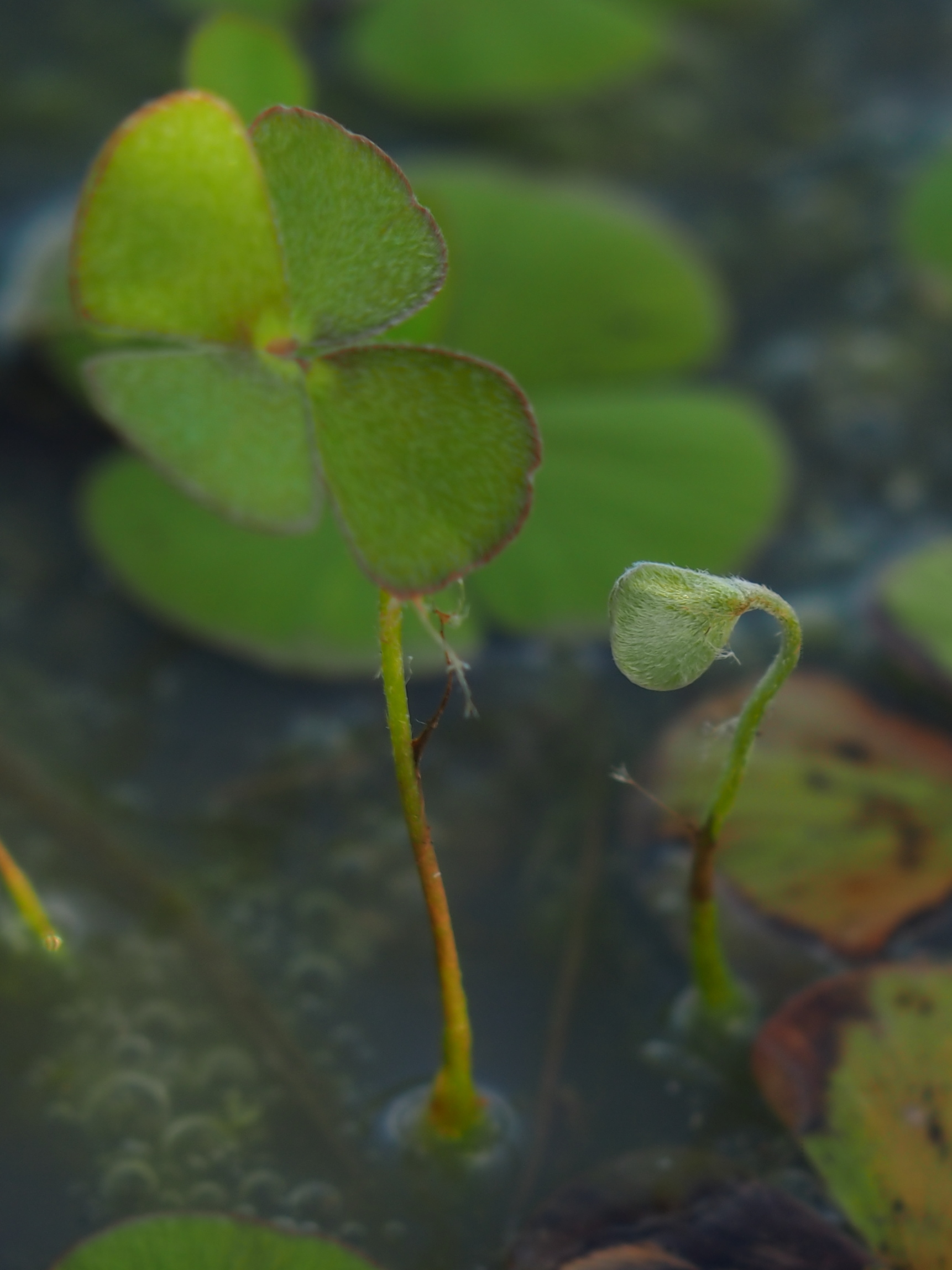
- M. drummondii leaf and fiddlehead

Scientific classification
- Kingdom: Plantae
- Clade: Tracheophytes
- Division: Polypodiophyta
- Class: Polypodiopsida
- Order: Salviniales
- Family: Marsileaceae
- Genus: Marsilea
- Species: M. drummondii

Binomial name
- Marsilea drummondii A.Braun
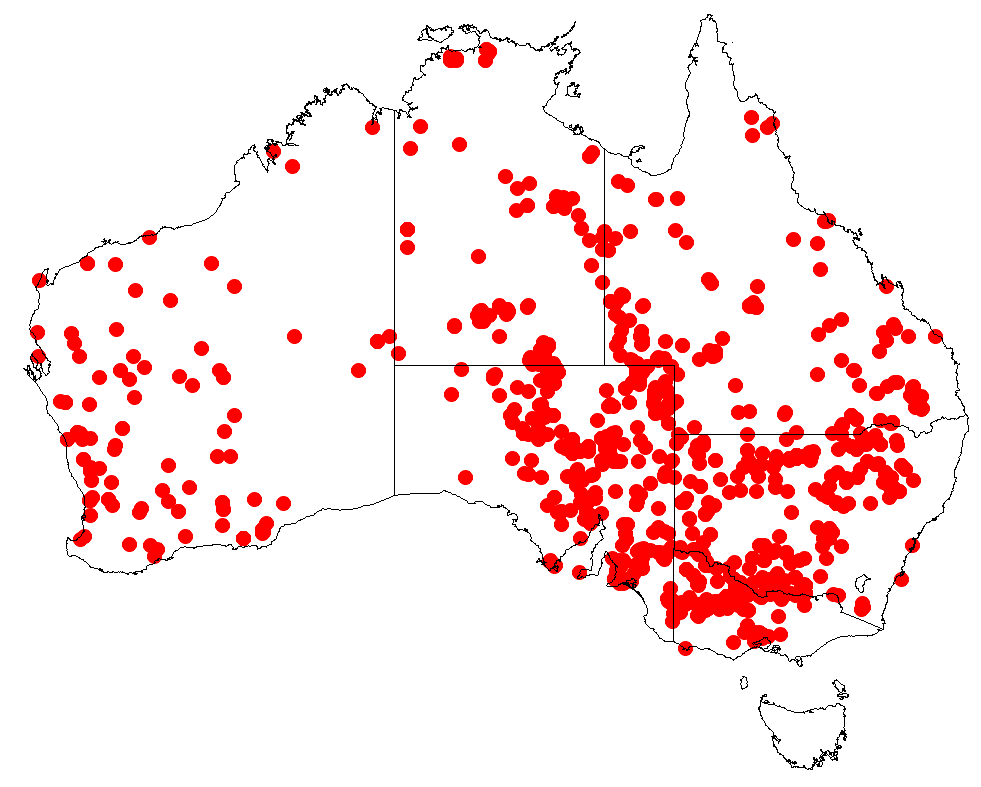
- Occurrence data from the Australasian Virtual Herbarium

Synonyms
- Marsilea drummondii var. hirsutissima (A.Braun) Domin; Marsilea drummondii var. howittiana (A.Braun) Domin; Marsilea drummondii f. macra (A.Braun) Domin; Marsilea drummondii var. nardu (A.Braun) Domin; Marsilea drummondii var. oxaloides (A.Braun) Domin; Marsilea drummondii var. sericea (A.Braun) Domin; Marsilea elata A.Braun; Marsilea hirsutissima A.Braun; Marsilea howittiana A.Braun; Marsilea macra A.Braun; Marsilea macropus Hook. Marsilea muelleri A.Braun; Marsilea nardu A.Braun; Marsilea oxaloides A.Braun; Marsilea salvatrix Hanst. Marsilea sericea A.Braun; Zaluzianskia drummondii (A.Braun) Kuntze; Zaluzianskia macropus (Hook.) Kuntze

= Marsilea drummondii =

Species of plant

Marsilea drummondii is a species of fern known by the common name nardoo (Diyari: ngardu). It is native to Australia, where it is widespread and common, particularly in inland regions. It is a rhizomatous perennial aquatic fern that roots in mud substrates and produces herbage that floats on the surface of quiet water bodies. It occurs in water up to one metre deep. It occurs in abundance after floods. It can form mats on the water's surface and cover the ground in carpets as floodwaters recede. It is variable in appearance and occurs in many types of wetland habitat. In general the frond is made up of two pairs of leaflets and is borne erect when not floating.

The plant produces sporocarps which can remain viable for 50 years and only release spores after being thoroughly soaked. These are dispersed by birds that eat them but cannot digest them, and by flowing water. The sporocarp is used for food by Aboriginal Australians, who collect, roast and grind them to powder which they mix with water to make a dough. The sporocarp can be toxic due to high levels of thiaminase, which destroys thiamine. Consumption of large amounts can cause beriberi. It has been known to poison sheep, as well as humans, including the leaders of the Burke and Wills expedition. Nardoo must be prepared properly using heat before consumption to destroy the thiaminase.

== Earliest Australian record ==
The earliest specimen in an Australian herbarium is MEL 0052999A, which was collected by Alan Cunningham in 1825 in the Brigalow Belt South region out of Gunnedah in the locality of Curlewis, in New South Wales.

== Gallery ==
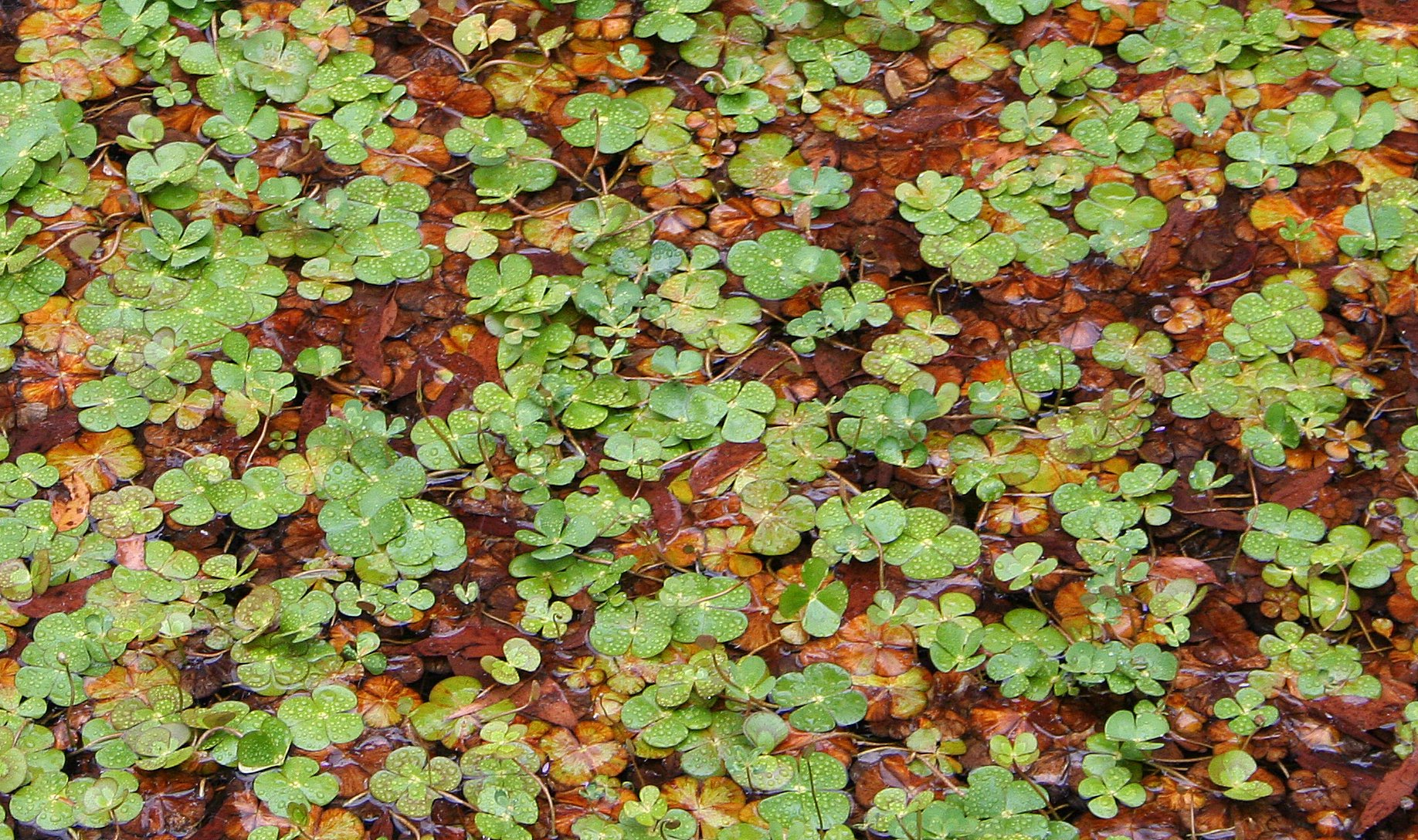

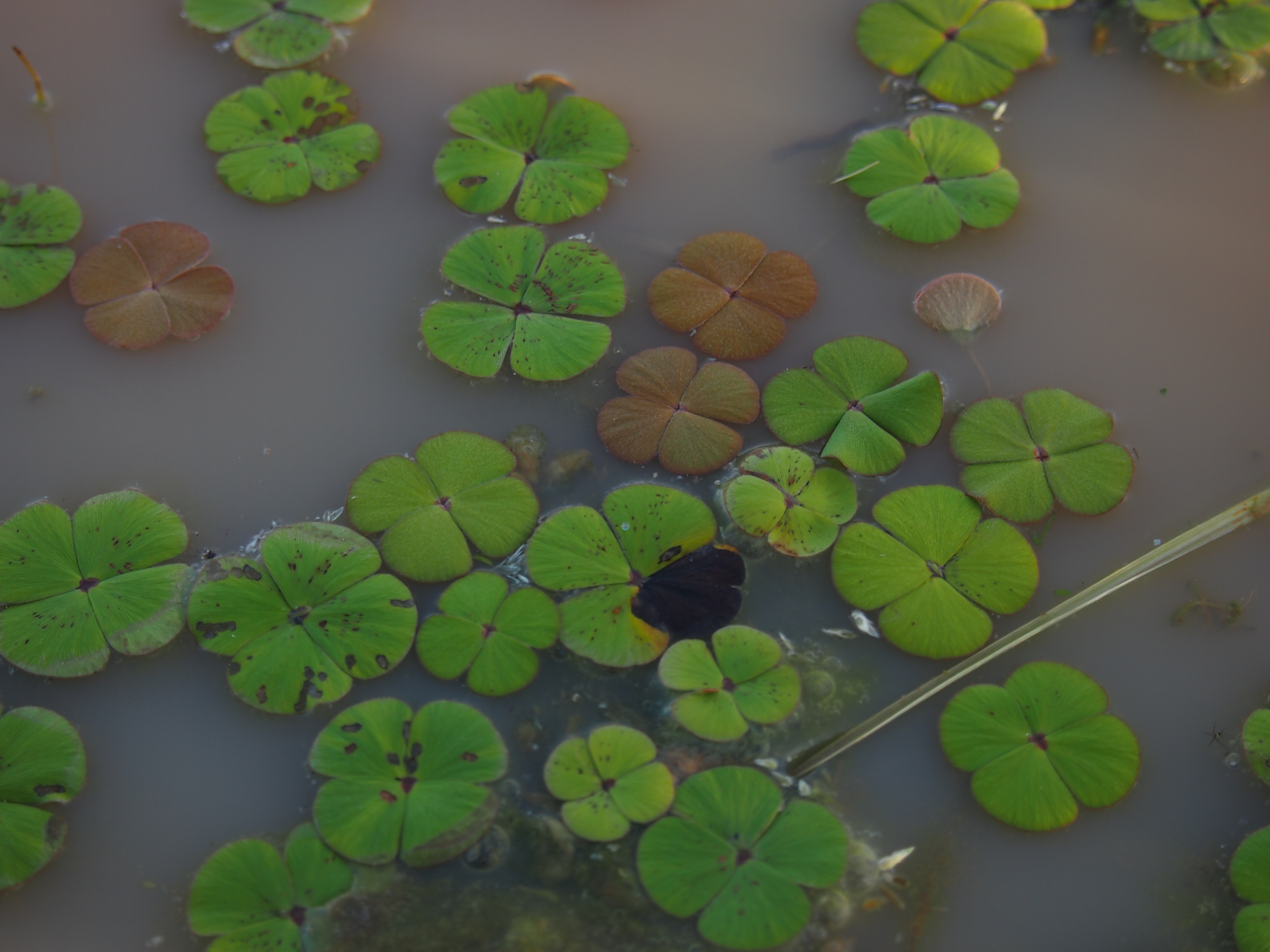

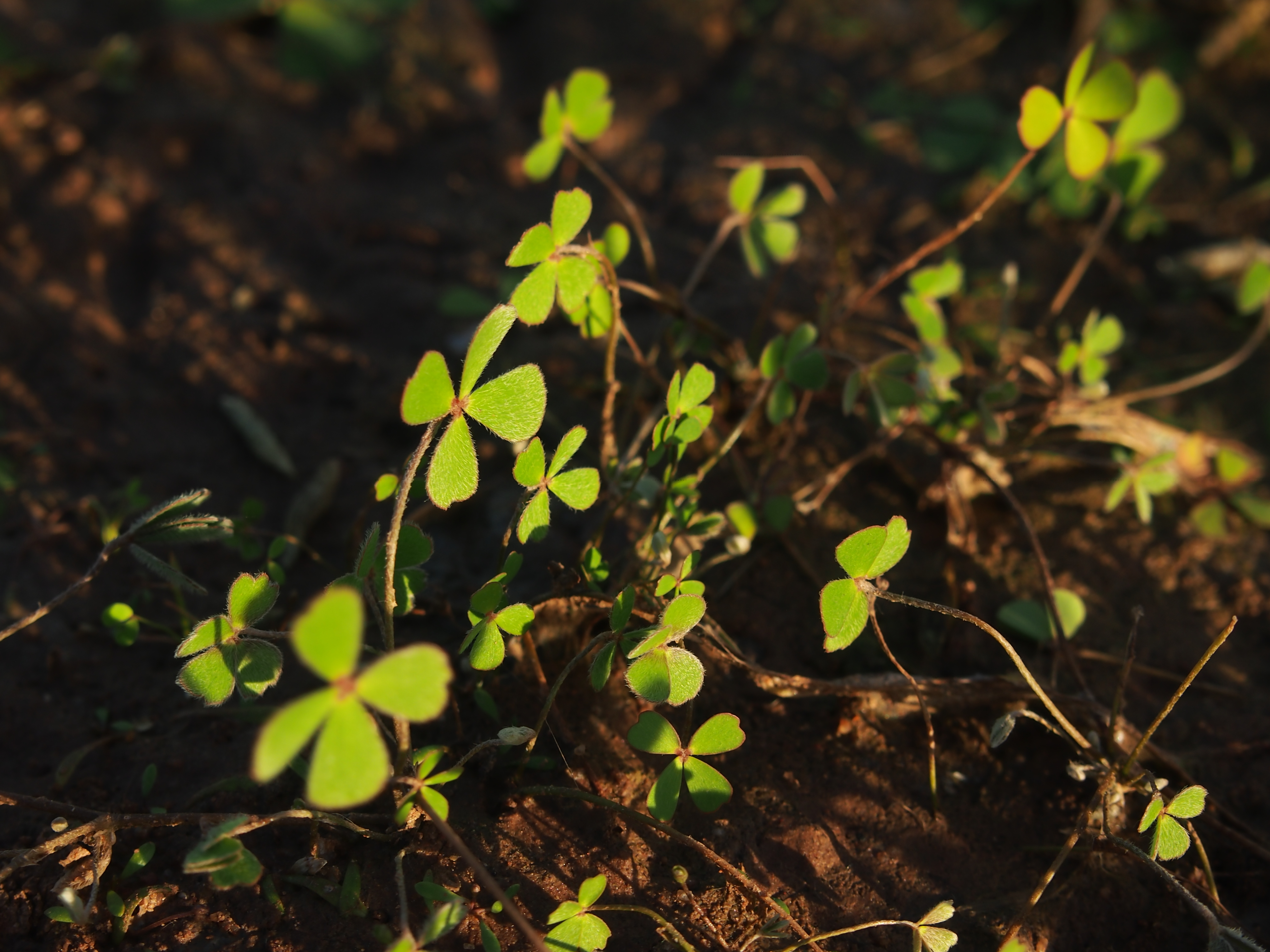

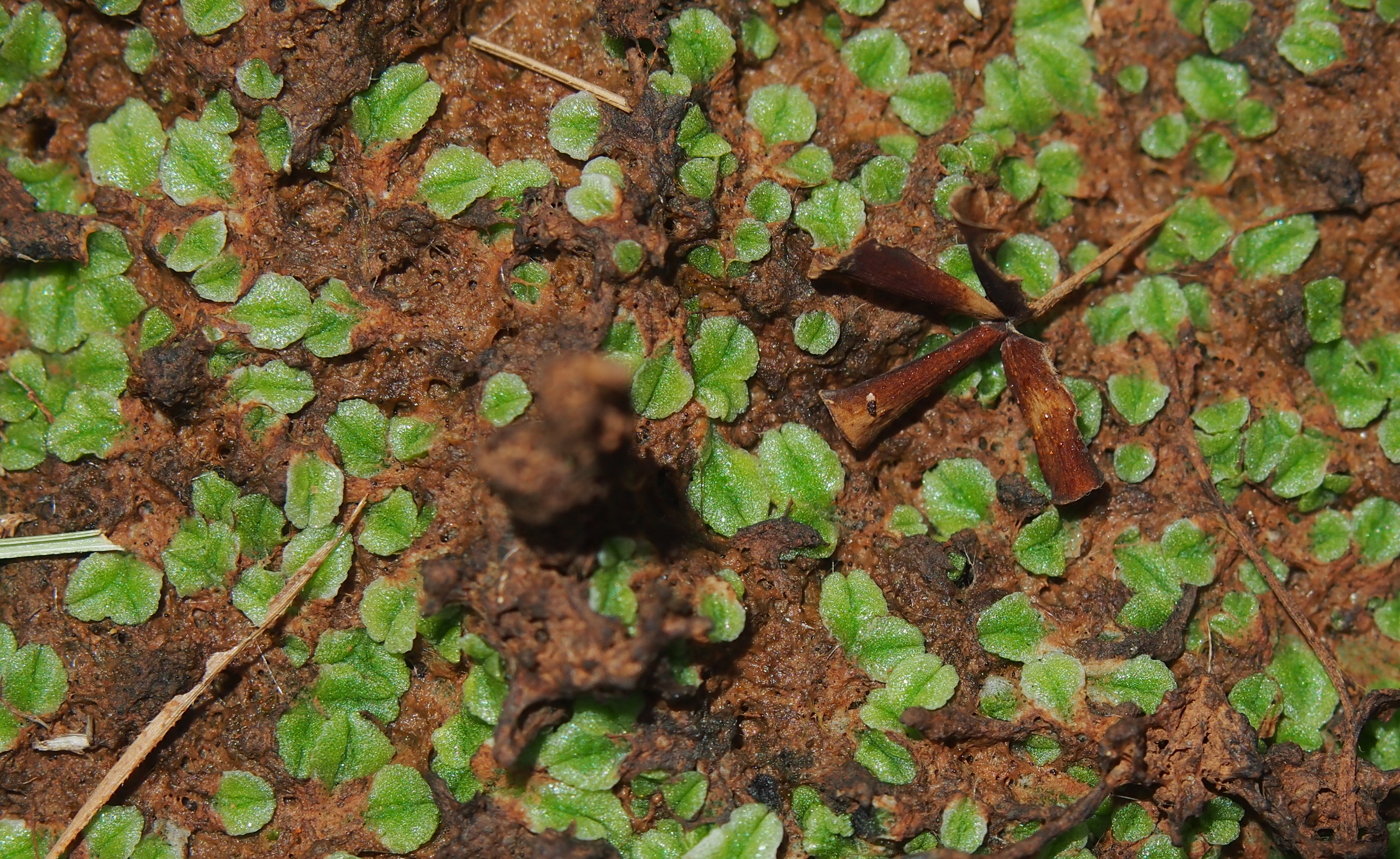

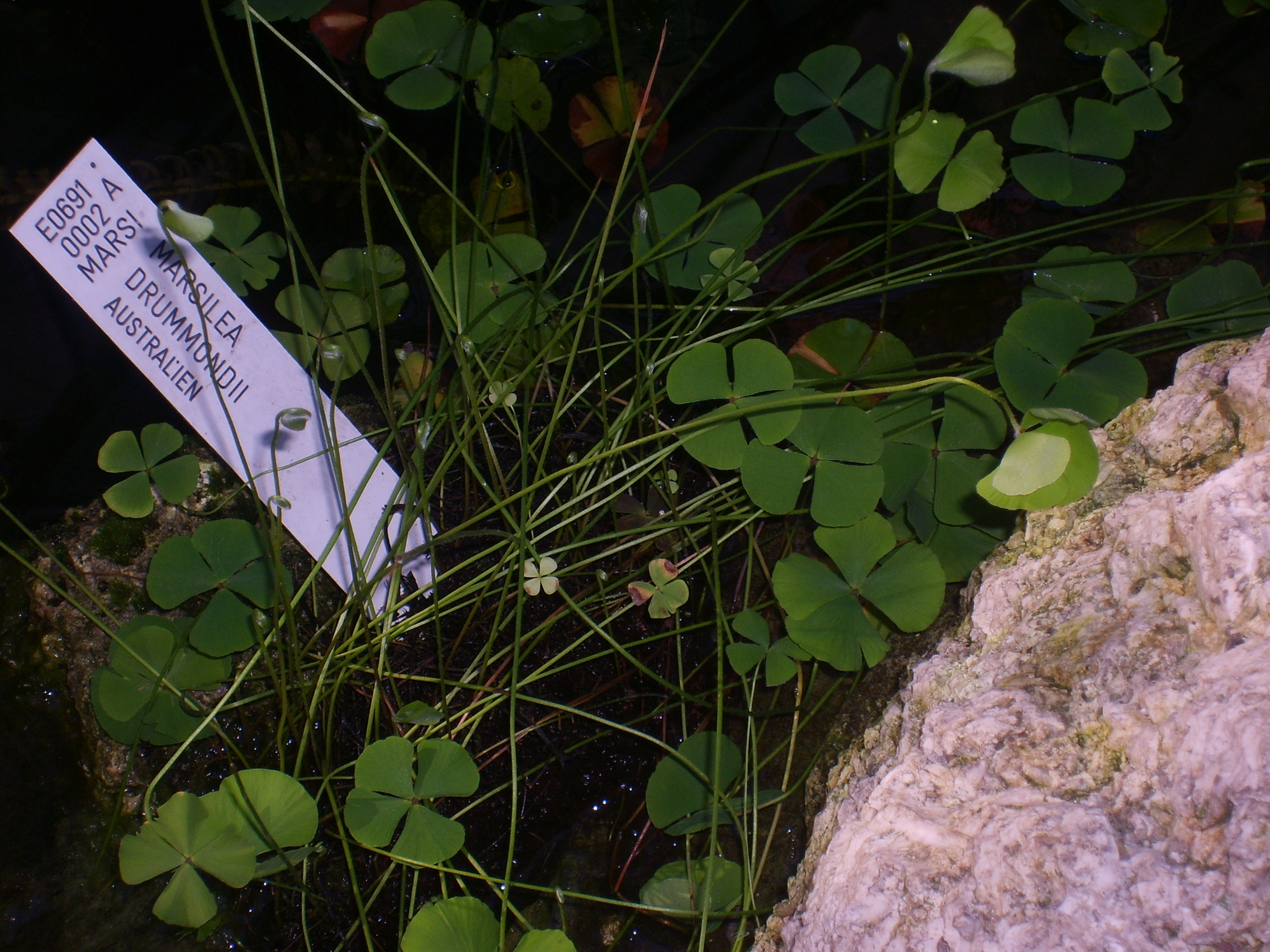

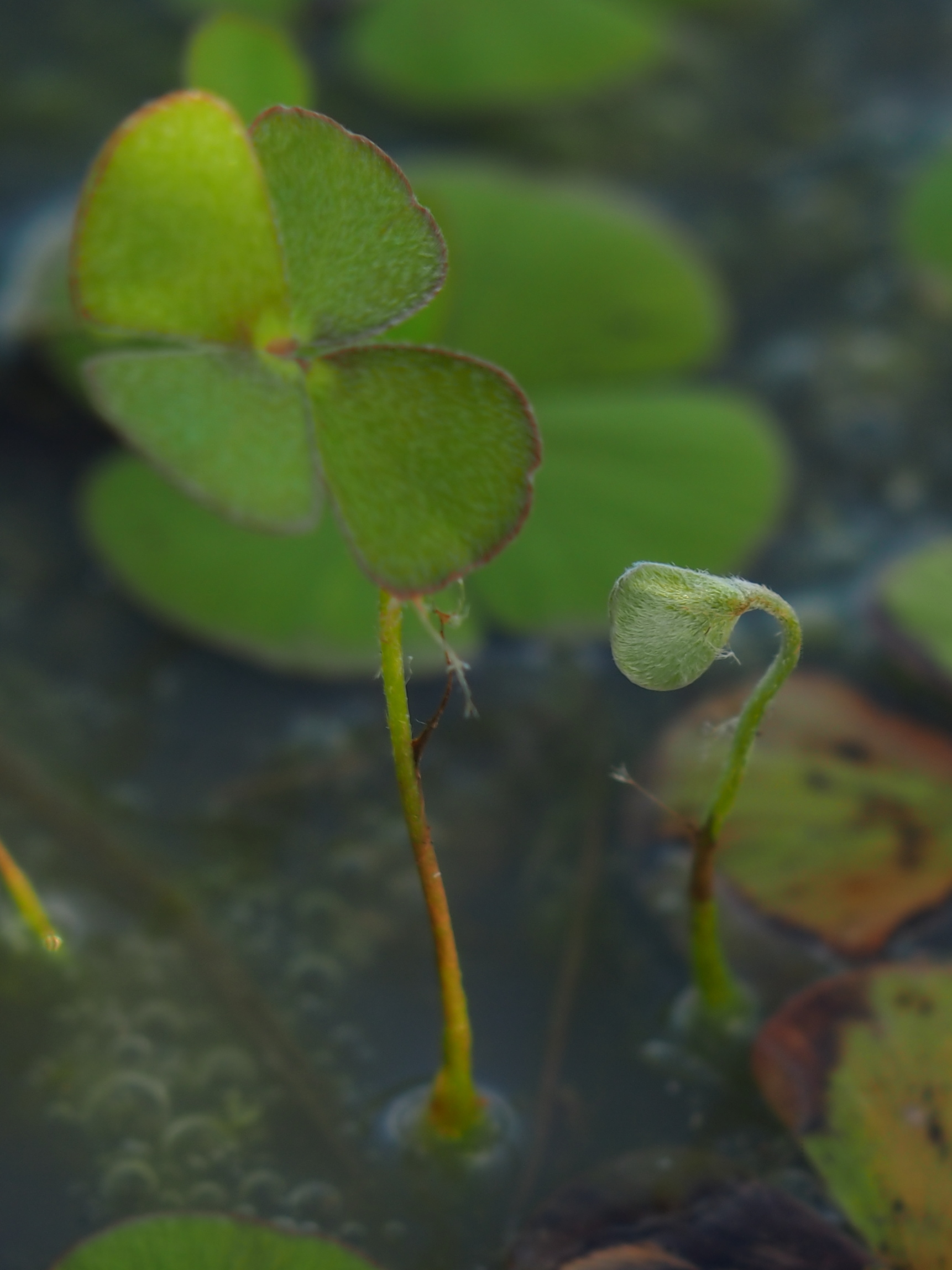
