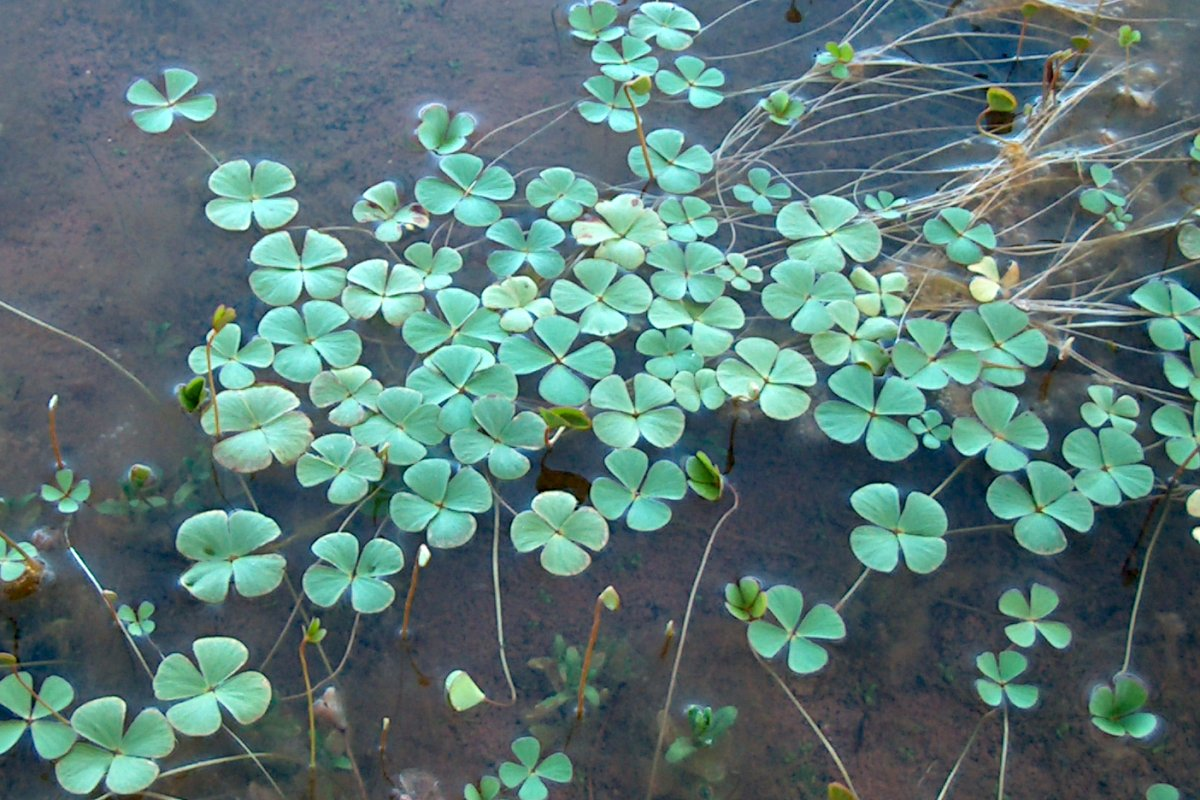
- Water form
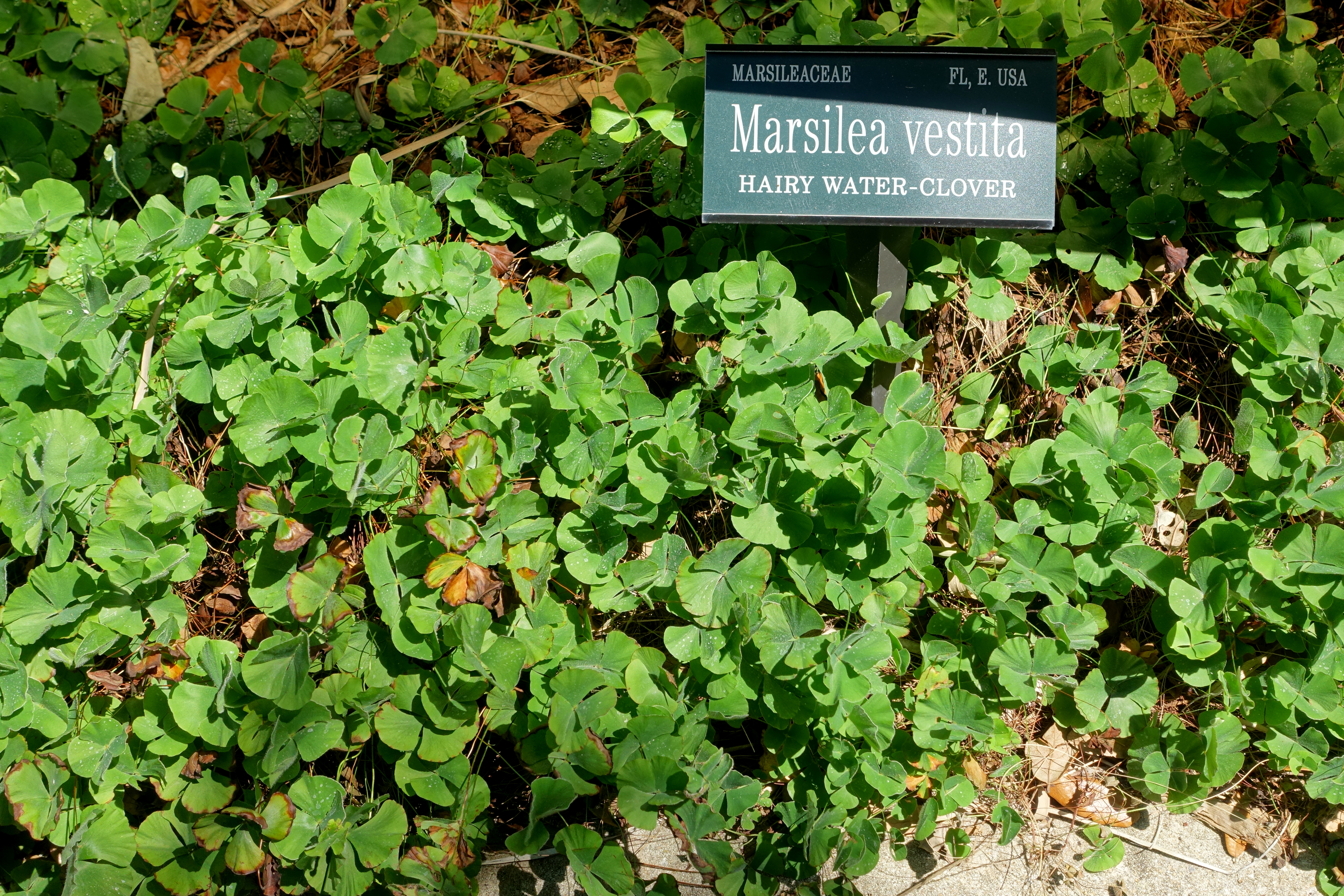
- Land form

Scientific classification
- Kingdom: Plantae
- Clade: Tracheophytes
- Division: Polypodiophyta
- Class: Polypodiopsida
- Order: Salviniales
- Family: Marsileaceae
- Genus: Marsilea
- Species: M. vestita

Binomial name
- Marsilea vestita Hook. & Grev.

Synonyms
- List: Marsilea brevipes Nutt.; Marsilea fournieri C.Chr.; Marsilea longipes Austin; Marsilea minuta Fourn.; Marsilea mucronata A.Braun; Marsilea picta Fée; Marsilea tenuifolia Engelm. ex A.Braun; Marsilea uncinata A.Braun; Marsilea vestita var. tenuifolia (Engelm. ex A.Braun) Underw.; Marsilea vestita subsp. tenuifolia (Engelm. ex A.Braun) D.M.Johnson; Zaluzianskia tenuifolia (Engelm. ex A.Braun) Kuntze; Zaluzianskia vestita (Hook. & Grev.) Kuntze

= Marsilea vestita =

Species of plant

Marsilea vestita, the hairy water-clover, is a species of largely aquatic fern in the family Marsileaceae. It is native to western and central North America, the Bahamas, Barbuda, and Peru. It can grow into a water form or a land form, depending on local conditions.
