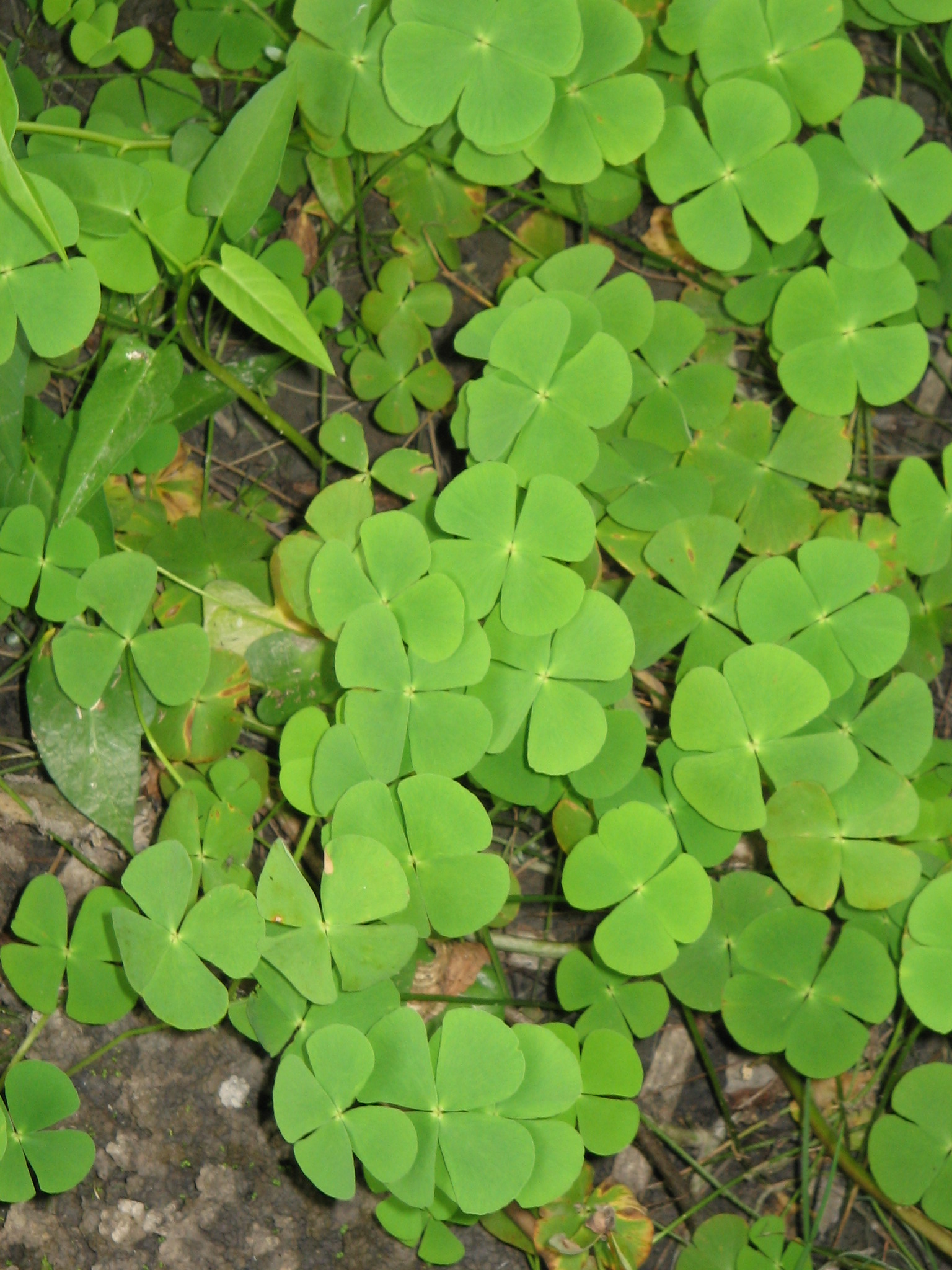

Conservation status
- Least Concern (IUCN 3.1)

Scientific classification
- Kingdom: Plantae
- Clade: Embryophytes
- Clade: Tracheophytes
- Division: Polypodiophyta
- Class: Polypodiopsida
- Order: Salviniales
- Family: Marsileaceae
- Genus: Marsilea
- Species: M. crenata

Binomial name
- Marsilea crenata C.Presl

= Marsilea crenata =

Species of fern found in Southeast Asia

Marsilea crenata is a species of fern found in Southeast Asia. It is an aquatic plant looking like a four leaf clover. Leaves float in deep water or erect in shallow water or on land. Leaflets glaucous, sporocarp ellipsoid, on stalks attached to base of petioles.

== Habitat ==
Marsilea crenata is an aquatic fern that usually grows in muddy or wet environments such as rice fields, shallow puddles, or ditches.

== Uses ==
The leaves of Marsilea crenata are part of the East Javanese cuisine of Indonesia, especially in the city of Surabaya where they are served with sweet potato and Pecel spicy peanut sauce.

These leaves are also part of the Isan cuisine of Thailand, where they are known as Phak waen and eaten raw with Nam phrik chilli dip.

== See also ==
- Javanese cuisine
- List of Thai ingredients
