= Sporocarp (ferns) =

Spore-releasing structure found in aquatic ferns

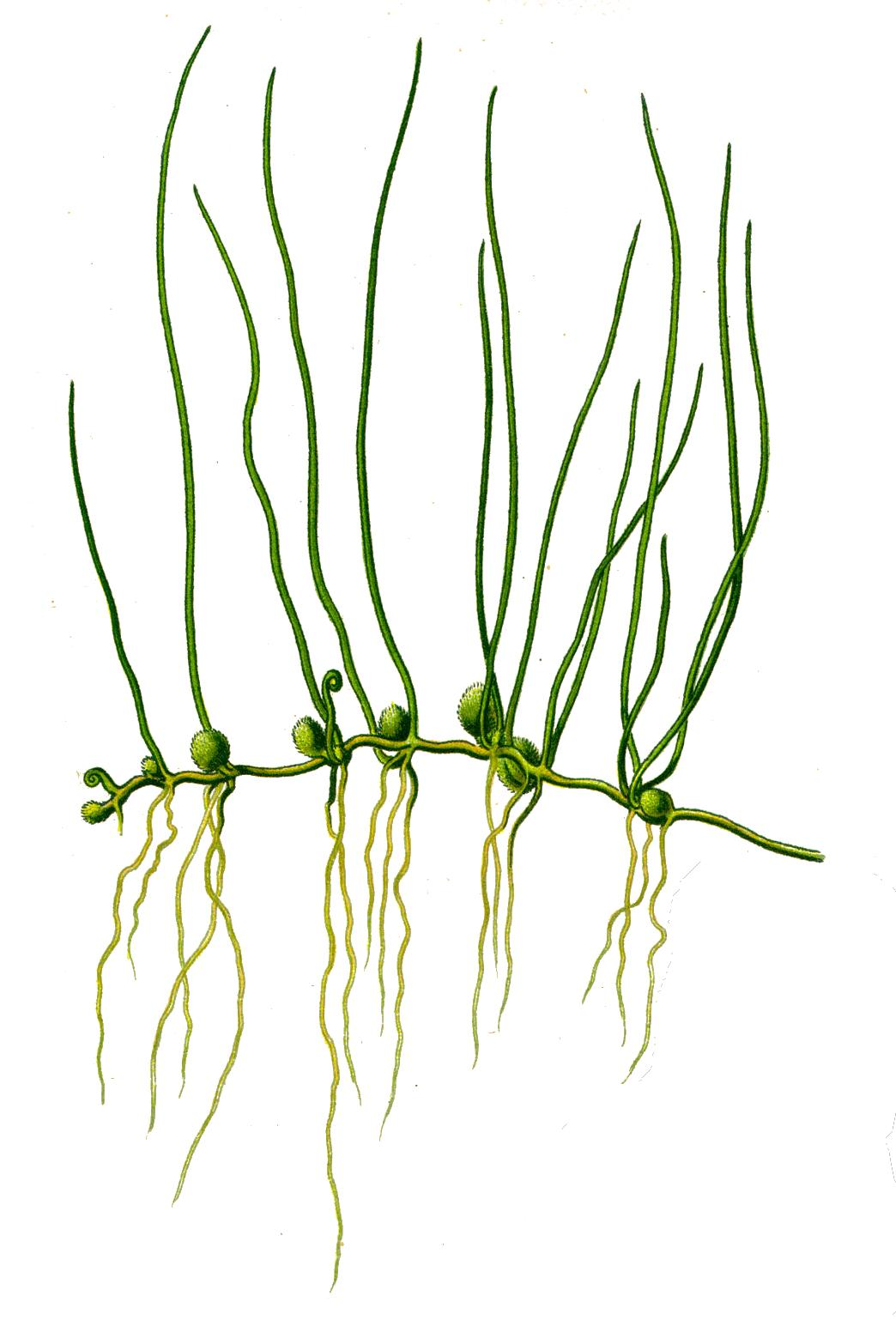
The European species Pilularia globulifera bearing sporocarps

A sporocarp is a specialised type of structure in the aquatic ferns of the order Salviniales whose primary function is the production and release of spores.

Sporocarps are found only in the Salviniales, a group that is aquatic and heterosporous, but the structures are very different in the two families of the order. In the Salviniaceae family, the sporocarp is nothing more than a modified sorus, a single cluster of spore-producing tissues enclosed by a thin sphere of tissue and attached to the leaves. In the Marsileaceae (water-clover) family, the sporocarp is a more elaborate structure formed from an entire leaf whose development and form is greatly modified. These are hairy, short-stalked, bean-shaped structures (usually 3 to 8 mm in diameter) with a hardened outer covering. This outer covering is tough and resistant to drying out, allowing the spores inside to survive unfavorable conditions such as winter frost or summer desiccation. Despite this toughness, the sporocarps will open readily in water if conditions are favorable, and specimens have been successfully germinated after being stored for more than forty years. Each growing season, only one sporocarp develops per node along the rhizome near the base of the other leaf-stalks.

The sporocarps are functionally and developmentally modified leaves, although they have much shorter stalks than the vegetative leaves. Inside the sporocarp, the modified leaflets bear several sori, each of which consists of several sporangia covered by a thin hood of tissue (the indusium). Each sorus includes a mix of two types of sporangium, each type producing only one of two kinds of spores. Toward the center of each sorus and developing first are the megasporangia, each of which will produce a single large female megaspore. Surrounding them at the edge of the sorus and developing later are the microsporangia, each of which will produce many small male microspores.
