= Salvinia effect =

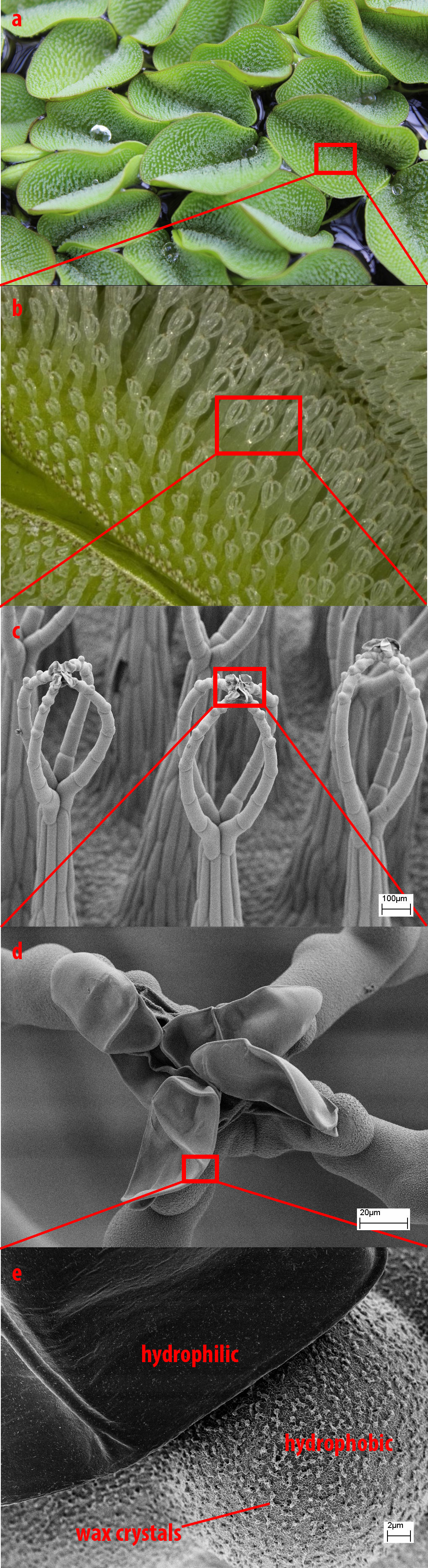
Giant Salvinia (S. molesta) at different magnifications; in the SEM picture d) the water repelling wax crystals and the four hydrophilic wax free anchor cells at the hair tips are visible.

The Salvinia effect describes the permanent stabilization of an air layer upon a hierarchically structured surface submerged in water. Based on biological models (e.g. the floating ferns Salvinia, backswimmer Notonecta), biomimetic Salvinia-surfaces are used as drag reducing coatings (up to 30% reduction were previously measured on the first prototypes. When applied to a ship hull, the coating would allow the boat to float on an air-layer, reducing energy consumption and emissions. Such surfaces require an extremely water repellent super-hydrophobic surface and an elastic hairy structure in the millimeter range to entrap air while submerged. The Salvinia effect was discovered by the biologist and botanist Wilhelm Barthlott (University of Bonn) and his colleagues and has been investigated on several plants and animals since 2002. Publications and patents were published between 2006 and 2016. The best biological models are the floating ferns (Salvinia) with highly sophisticated hierarchically structured hairy surfaces, and the back swimmers (e.g.Notonecta) with a complex double structure of hairs (setae) and microvilli (microtrichia). Three of the ten known Salvinia species show a paradoxical chemical heterogeneity: hydrophilic hair tips, in addition to the super-hydrophobic plant surface, further stabilizing the air layer.

== Salvinia, Notonecta and other organisms with air retaining surfaces ==
Immersed in water, extremely water repellent (super-hydrophobic), structured surfaces trap air between the structures and this air-layer is maintained for a period of time. A silvery shine, due to the reflection of light at the interface of air and water, is visible on the submerged surfaces.

Long lasting air layers also occur in aquatic arthropods which breathe via a physical gill (plastron) e. g. the water spider (Argyroneta) and the saucer bug (Aphelocheirus) Air layers are presumably also conducive to the reduction of friction in fast moving animals under water, as is the case for the back swimmer Notonecta.

The best known examples for long term air retention under water are the floating ferns of genus Salvinia. About ten species of very diverse sizes are found in lentic water in all warmer regions of the earth, one widely spread species (S. natans) found in temperate climates can be even found in Central Europe. The ability to retain air is presumably a survival technique for these plants. The upper side of the floating leaves is highly water repellent and possesses highly complex and species-specific very distinctive hairs. Some species present multicellular free-standing hairs of 0.3–3 mm length (e. g. S. cucullata) while on others, two hairs are connected at the tips (e.g. S. oblongifolia). S. minima and S. natans have four free standing hairs connected at a single base. The Giant Salvinia (S. molesta), as well as S. auriculata, and other closely related species, display the most complex hairs: four hairs grow on a shared shaft; they are connected at their tips. These structures resemble microscopic eggbeaters and are therefore referred to as “eggbeater trichomes”. The entire leaf surface, including the hairs, is covered with nanoscale wax crystals which are the reason for the water repellent properties of the surfaces. These leaf surfaces are therefore a classical example of a “hierarchical structuring“.

The egg-beater hairs of Salvinia molesta and closely related species (e.g. S. auriculata) show an additional remarkable property. The four cells at the tip of each hair (the anchor cells), as opposed to the rest of the hair, are free of wax and therefore hydrophilic; in effect, wettable islands surrounded by a super-hydrophobic surface. This chemical heterogeneity, the Salvinia paradox, enables a pinning of the air water interface to the plant and increases the pressure and longtime stability of the air layer.

The air retaining surface of the floating fern does not lead to a reduction in friction. The ecological extremely adaptable Giant Salvinia (S. molesta) is one of the most important invasive plants in all tropical and subtropical regions of the earth and is the cause of economic as well as ecological problems. Its growth rate might be the highest of all vascular plants. In the tropics and under optimal conditions, S. molesta can double its biomass within four days. The Salvinia effect, described here, most likely plays an essential role in its ecological success; the multilayered floating plant mats presumably maintain their function of gas exchange within the air-layer.

== The working principle ==
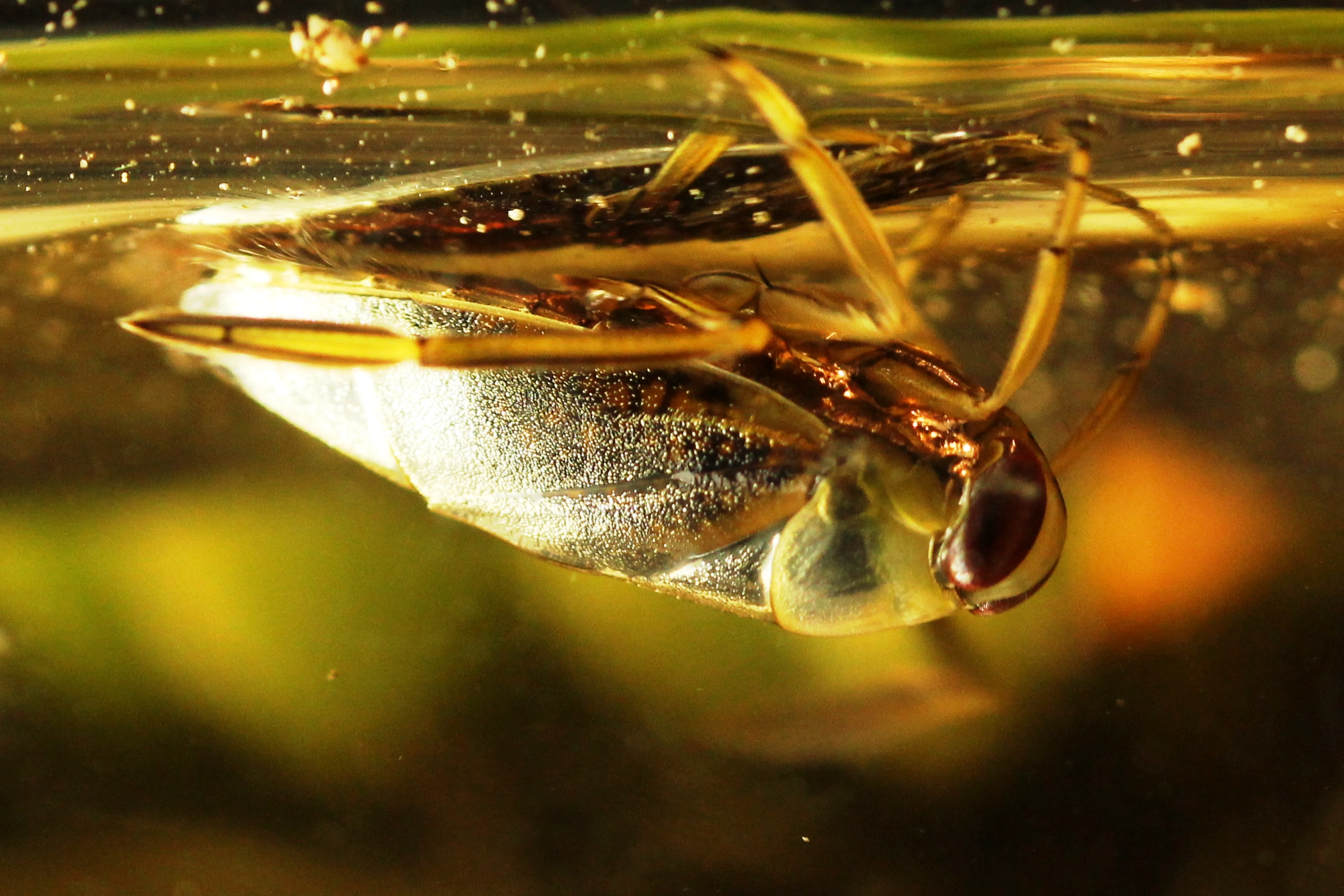
Backswimmer (Notonecta glauca) under water: the silvery gleam is from the light reflecting off the interface between the air-layer on the wing and the surrounding water.

The Salvinia effect defines surfaces which are able to permanently keep relatively thick air layers as a result of their hydrophobic chemistry, in combination with a complex architecture in nano- and microscopic dimensions.

This phenomenon was discovered during a systematic research on aquatic plants and animals by Wilhelm Barthlott and his colleagues at the University of Bonn between 2002 and 2007. Five criteria have been defined, they enable the existence of stable air layers under water and as of 2009 define the Salvinia effect: (1) hydrophobic surfaces chemistry in combination with (2) nanoscalic structures generate superhydrophobicity, (3) microscopic hierarchical structures ranging from a few micro- to several millimeters with (4) undercuts and (5) elastic properties. Elasticity appears to be important for the compression of the air-layer in dynamic hydrostatic conditions. An additional optimizing criterion is the chemical heterogeneity of the hydrophilic tips (Salvinia Paradox). This is a prime example of a hierarchical structuring on several levels.

In plants and animals, air retaining salvinia effect surfaces are always fragmented in small compartments with a length of 0.5 to 8 cm and the borders are sealed against loss of air by particular microstructures. Compartments with sealed edges are also important for technical applications.

The working principle is illustrated in for the Giant Salvinia. The leaves of S. molesta are capable of keeping an air layer on its surfaces for a long time when submerged in water. If a leaf is pulled under water, the leaf surface shows a silvery shine. The distinctive feature of S. molesta lies in the long term stability. While the air layer on most hydrophobic surfaces vanishes shortly after submerging, S. molesta is able to stabilize the air for several days to several weeks. The time span is thereby just limited by the lifetime of the leaf.

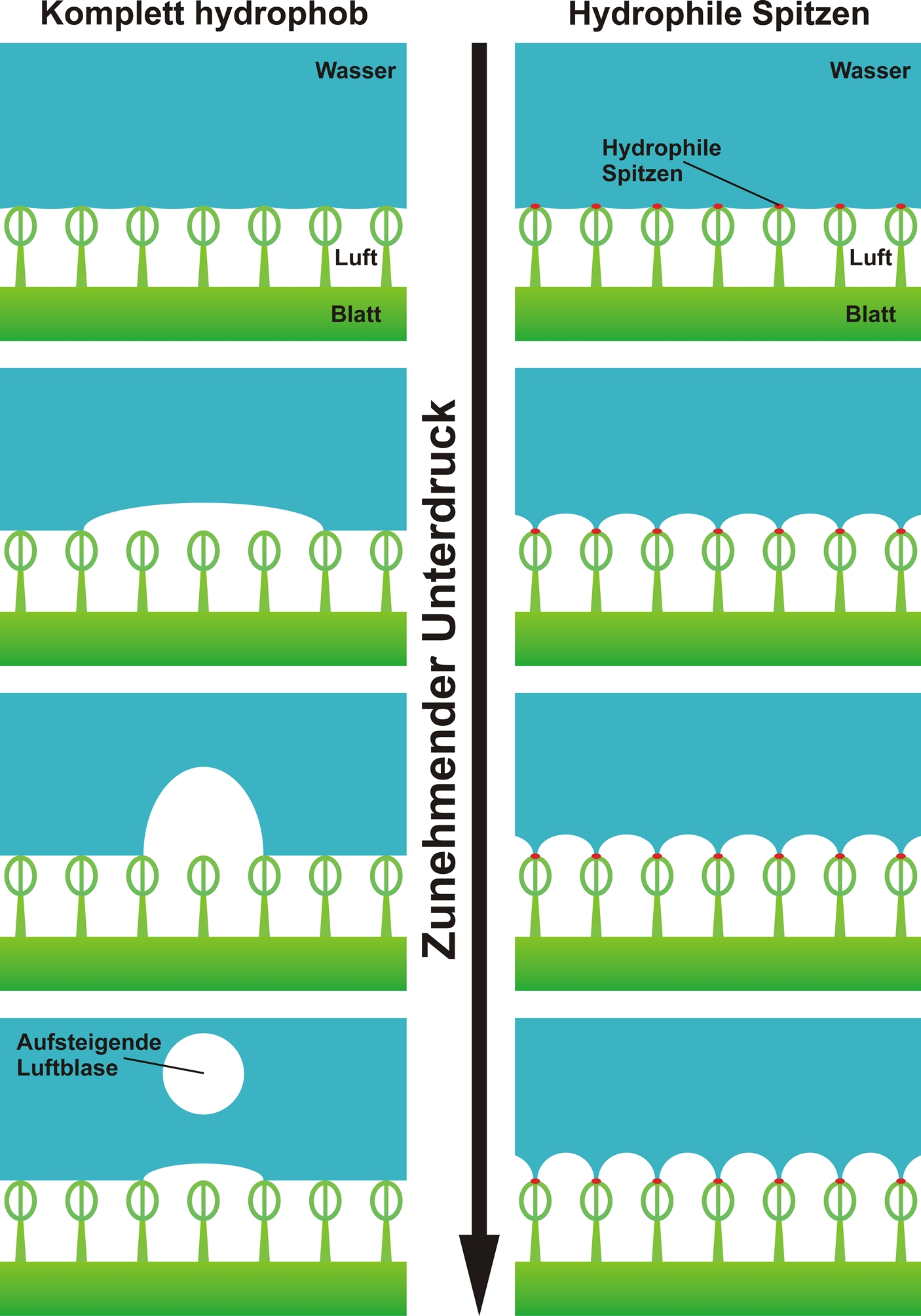
Schematic illustration of the stabilization of underwater air layers retained by the hydrophilic Anchor cells (“Salvinia paradox”)

The high stability is a consequence of a seemingly paradoxical combination of a superhydrophobic (extremely water repellent) surface with hydrophilic (water attractive) patches on the tips of the structures.

When submerged under water, no water can penetrate the room between the hairs due to the hydrophobic character of the surfaces. However, the water is pinned to the tip of each hair by the four wax free (hydrophilic) end cells. This fixation results in a stabilization of the air layer under water. The principle is shown in the figure.

Two submerged, air retaining surfaces are schematically shown: on the left hand side: a hydrophobic surface. On the right hand side: a hydrophobic surface with hydrophilic tips.

If negative pressure is applied, a bubble is quickly formed on the purely hydrophobic surfaces (left) stretching over several structures. With increasing negative pressure the bubble grows and can detach from the surface. The air bubble rises to the surface and the air layer decreases until it vanishes completely.

In case of the surface with hydrophilic anchor cells (right) the water is pinned to the tips of every structure by the hydrophilic patch on top. These linkages allow the formation of a bubble stretching over several structures; bubble release is suppressed because several links have to be broken first. This results in a higher energy input for the bubble formation. Therefore, an increased negative pressure is needed to form a bubble able to detach from the surface and rise upwards.

== Biomimetic technical application ==
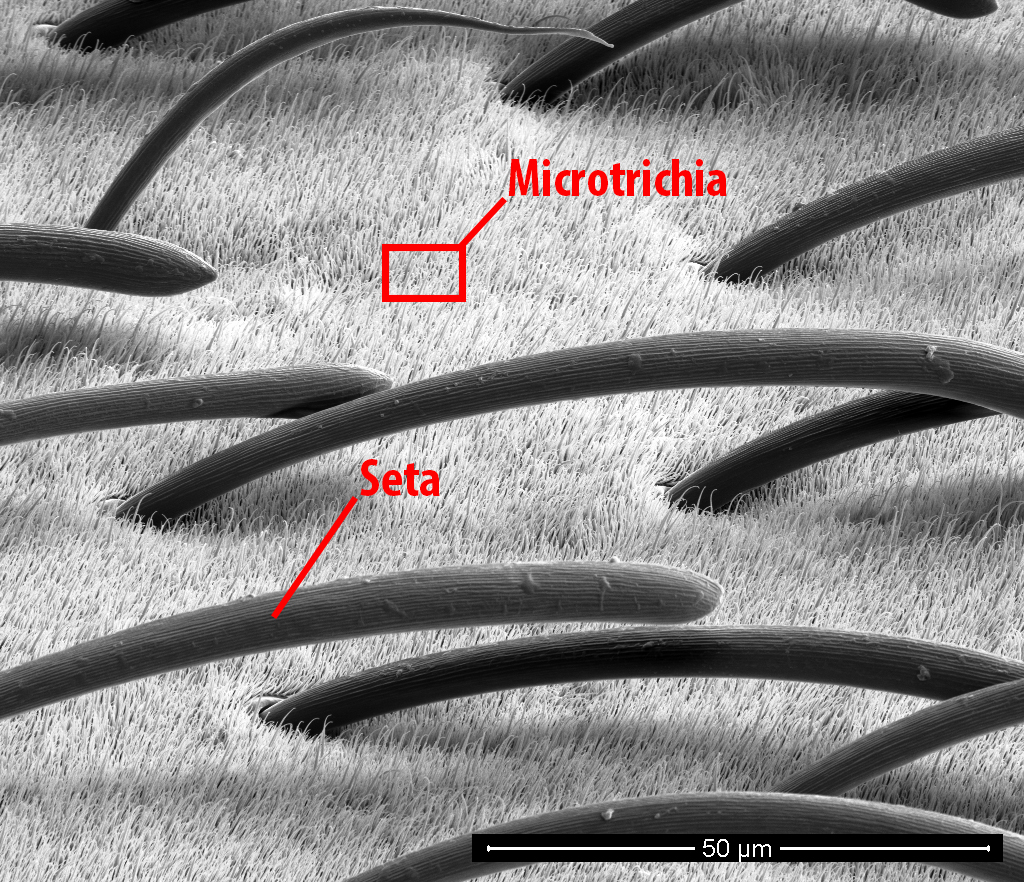
Backswimmers (Notonecta glauca): the interfaces of the wings facing the water have a hierarchical structure composed of long hairs (Satae) and a carpet of microvilli.

Underwater air retaining surfaces are of great interest for technical applications. If a transfer of the effect to a technical surface is successful, ship hulls could be coated with this surface to reduce friction between ship and water resulting in less fuel consumption, fuel costs and reduction of its negative environmental impact (antifouling effect by the air layer). In 2007 first test boats already achieved a ten percent friction reduction and the principle was subsequently patented. By now scientists assume a friction reduction of over 30%.

The underlying principle is schematically shown in a figure. Two flow profiles of laminar flow in water over a solid surface and water flowing over an air retaining surface are compared here.

If water flows over a smooth solid surface, the velocity at the surface is zero due to the friction between water and surface molecules. If an air layer is situated between the solid surface and the water the velocity is higher than zero. The lower viscosity of air (55 times lower than the viscosity of water) reduces the transmission of friction forces by the same factor.

Schematic illustration comparing the fluid dynamics of water along a solid surface and an air retaining surface: Directly at the solid surface the velocity of the water is zero due to the friction of water molecules and surface (left). In the case of the air retaining surface (right) the air layer serves as a slip agent. Due to the low viscosity of the air, the water is able to move on the air-water-interface which means a drag reduction and a velocity higher than zero.

Researchers are currently working on the development of a biomimetic, permanently air retaining surface modeled on S. molesta to reduce friction on ships. Salvinia-Effect surfaces have been proven to quickly and efficiently adsorb oil and can be used for oil-water separation applications

== Animations ==
The biomimetic device BOA (Bionic Oil Adsorber) separates automatically on a purely physical basis oil films from water surfaces. It was developed from the research on Salvina Effect and Lotus Effect in 2018 at the University of Bonn. The oil film (red) is adsorbed onto a biomimetic textile (green) and collected into a floating bowl (grey) for subsequent removal. More information in Barthlott et al. in Phil Trans. Roy. Soc. A. https://royalsocietypublishing.org/doi/10.1098/rsta.2019.0447 - © W. Barthlott, M. Moosmann & M. Mail 2020

The Salvinia Effect for oil water separation: fast and superficial adsorption and transport of a crude oil droplet on an air trapping superhydrophobic leaf of Salvinia molesta. More information in Barthlott et al. in Phil Trans. Roy. Soc. A. https://royalsocietypublishing.org/doi/10.1098/rsta.2019.0447 - © W. Barthlott & M. Mail 2020

== See also ==
- Lotus effect
- Petal effect
