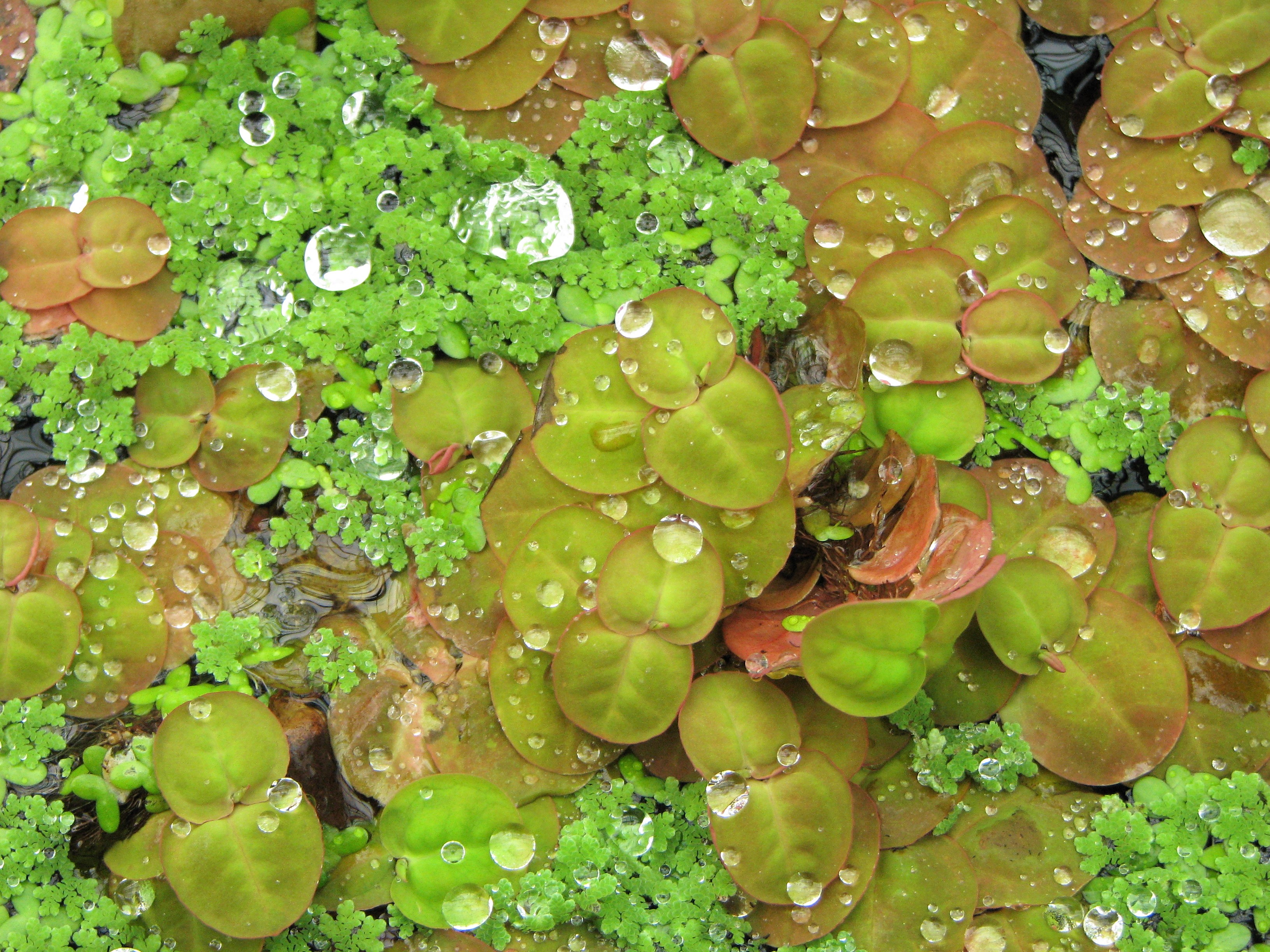
- Phyllanthus fluitans with Azolla and Lemna

Scientific classification
- Kingdom: Plantae
- Clade: Embryophytes
- Clade: Tracheophytes
- Clade: Angiosperms
- Clade: Eudicots
- Clade: Rosids
- Order: Malpighiales
- Family: Phyllanthaceae
- Genus: Phyllanthus
- Species: P. fluitans

Binomial name
- Phyllanthus fluitans Benth. ex Müll.Arg.

Synonyms
- Diasperus fluitans (Benth. ex Müll.Arg.) Kuntze; Phyllanthus fluitans Benth.

= Phyllanthus fluitans =

Species of aquatic plant

Phyllanthus fluitans, also known as the red root floater, floating spurge, or apple duckweed (although it is neither a spurge or a duckweed), is a species of free floating aquatic plant and herbaceous perennial in the family Phyllanthaceae. This species is one of the only three non-terrestrial species in the genus Phyllanthus, with the other species being P. leonardianus and P. felicis. The generic name comes from Ancient Greek meaning leaf or a leaf (φύλλον, phúllon; phyll) flower (ἄνθος, anthos; anthus), and the specific name comes from Latin meaning floating or float (fluito; fluitans). It was described in March 1863 by George Bentham and Johannes Müller Argoviensis.

== Description ==
The stems are 3 to 5 cm long, with many rootlets emerging from the nodes. The leaves are sessile and are cordate-orbicular (heart shaped), the leaf surface forms a pocket on each side of the midrib that traps air and helps plants float on the water. Plants produce 2–4 small white polymerous actinomorphic unisexual flowers on a cyme inflorescence and are nearly 1.5 mm long. Seed capsules are depressed-globular in shape and nearly 3 mm wide with six triangular seeds per capsule, 1.7 mm long by 1.1 mm wide. Below the epidermis there are large cells bulging outwards, with one or two layers of green cells, sometimes slightly elongated perpendicular to the surface constituting something that resembles or is a palisade parenchyma. There are large gaps separated by walls formed from a single thickness of cells that often go from the chlorenchyma to the lower epidermis. Sometimes this epidermis is also covered by a layer of cells elongated tangentially. We can imagine that with a similar morphology and an anatomy which allows the storage of air the plant is able to float and remain horizontal in an aquatic environment. The lower epidermis is devoid of stomata with a few on the upper epidermis. The leaves vary from green to red depending on the light brightness. The leaves are also hydrophobic, probably due to the Salvinia effect.

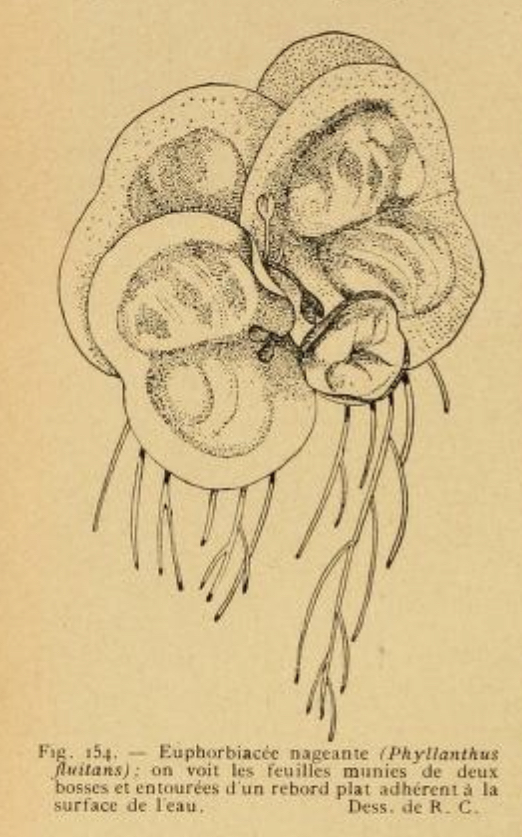
An illustration of Phyllanthus fluitans made by R.C.

== Taxonomy ==
It was formerly placed in the family Euphorbiaceae evident from the common name "floating spurge", along with many other species in the genus Phyllanthus and Phyllanthaceae until 1993, when a maximum parsimony was done and revealed that Euphorbiaceae had several lineages in it, including Phyllanthaceae and its subsequent taxa. It is also apparently most closely related to P. caroliniensis.

== Distribution and habitat ==
It is native to the Amazon basin with its range being in Peru, Ecuador, Colombia, Brazil, Bolivia, Venezuela, Paraguay, and northern Argentina with the type location being in the Rio Negro tributary. It has been seen outside its native range in southern Florida and Mexico (Tabasco) being naturalised where it has invaded. This species’ distribution can also potentially reach Puerto Rico, Hawaii, Louisiana, the southern parts of south east states of the US like Texas, Alabama, Georgia, and Mississippi where it has the potential to be a problematic invasive species like water fern, water lettuce and water hyacinth by covering large swaths of stagnant backwater areas. This noxious species may limit or totally block all ambient light penetration to the bottom of the system, which can stunt and potentially kill submersed plants growing below. It has also been recorded in Panama.

== Discovery ==
This species was discovered for the first time by English botanist Richard Spruce in the Amazon. At the time of discovery, he wrote in his journal:

Although as far removed from Sahinià (swimming aquatic fern) as the poles are from each other, the Phyllanthus fluitans looked so similar in its general appearance that I could hardly believe my eyes when I recognized that it belonged to the flowering plants. This is one of the many cases that I have encountered of plants which, totally different in the structure of their flowers and their fruits, manage to resemble each other in their devices.

== Commercial use ==
Red root floater is grown commercially for use in aquariums. The plant is known for its red roots (hence the common name) and the reddish tint the leaves gain when exposed to bright light.

== Gallery ==
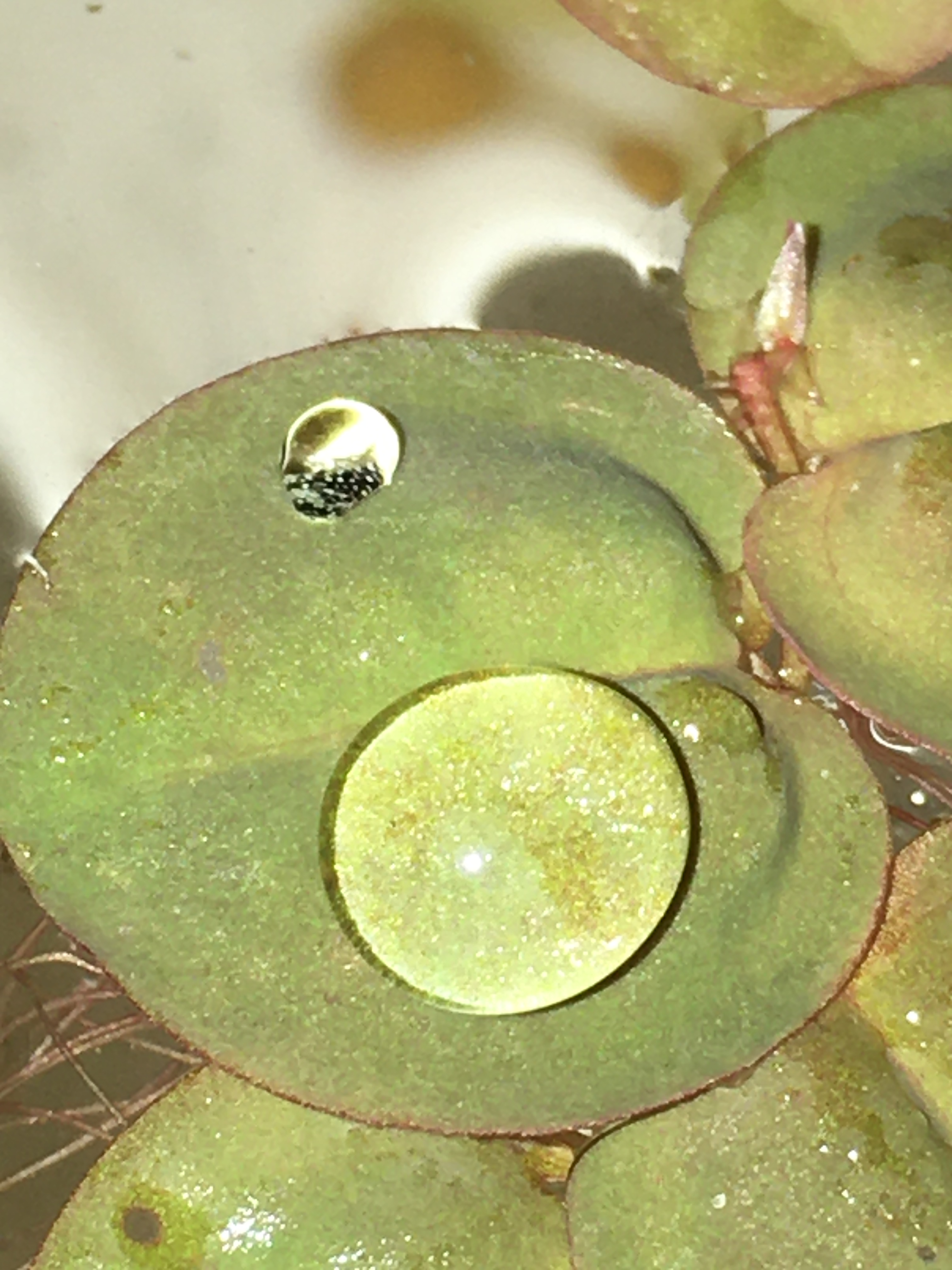
Hydrophobic properties of Phyllanthus fluitans showing

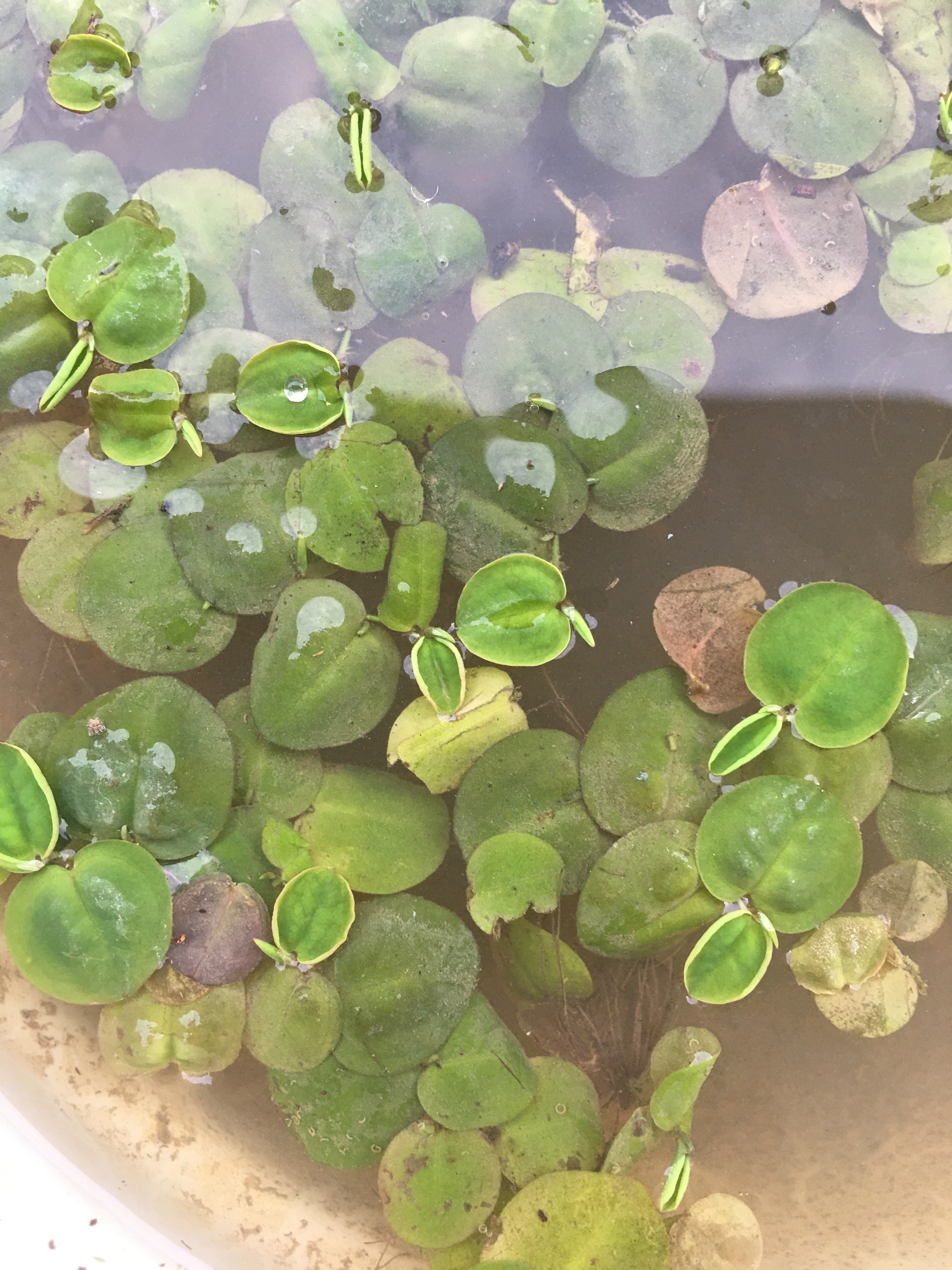
New green leaves

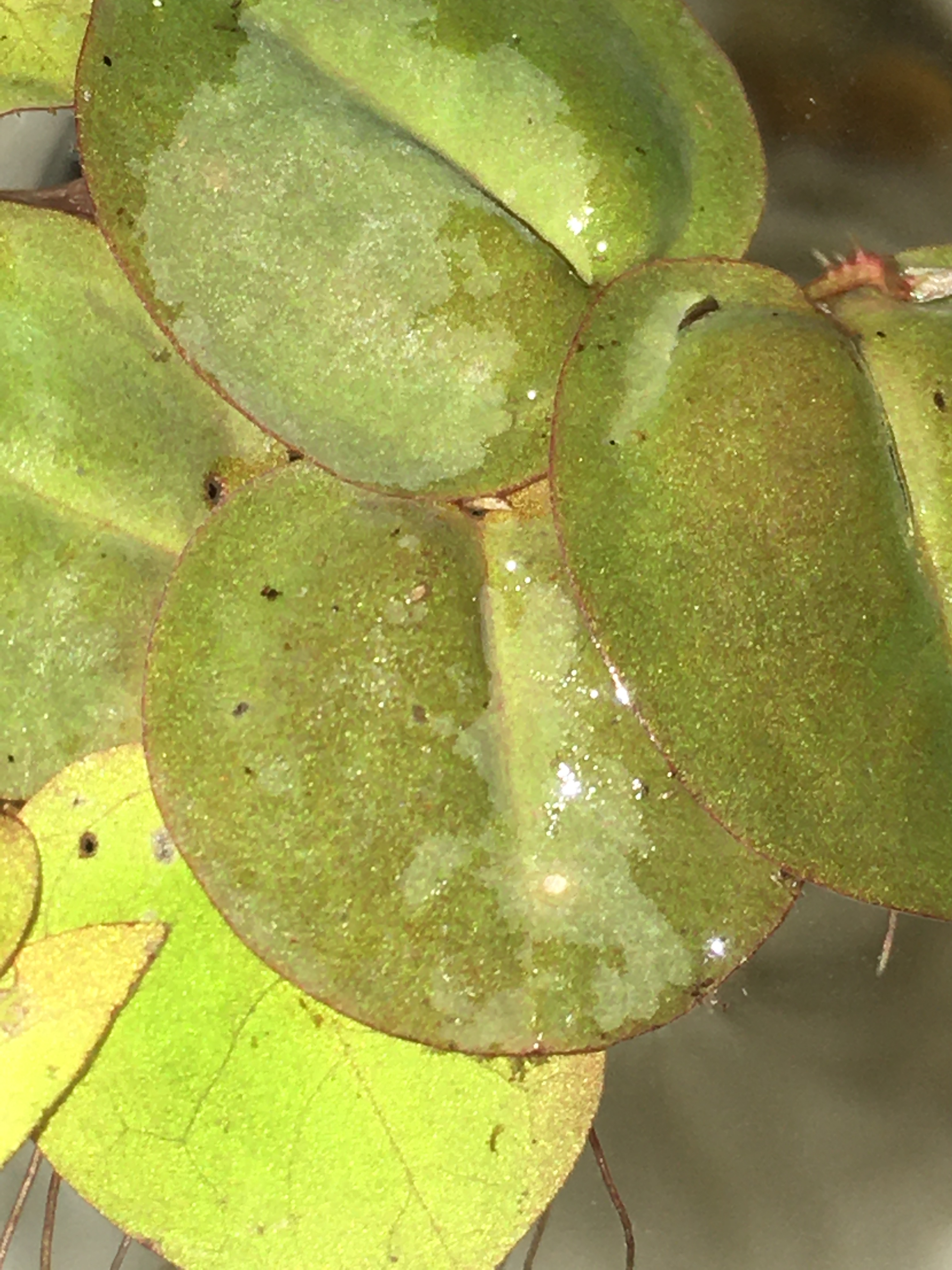
Phyllanthus fluitans leaves on water

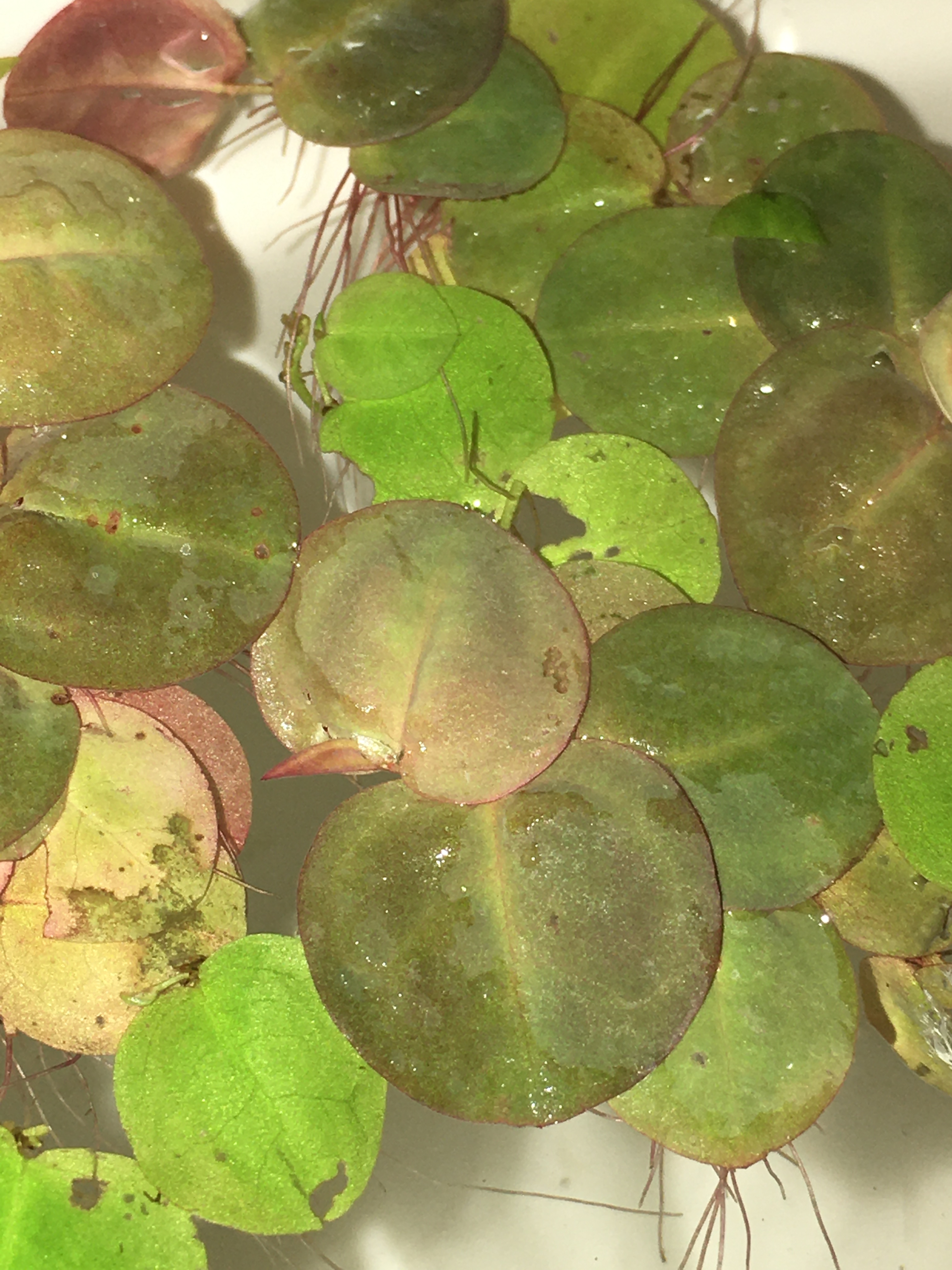
Phyllanthus fluitans clusters

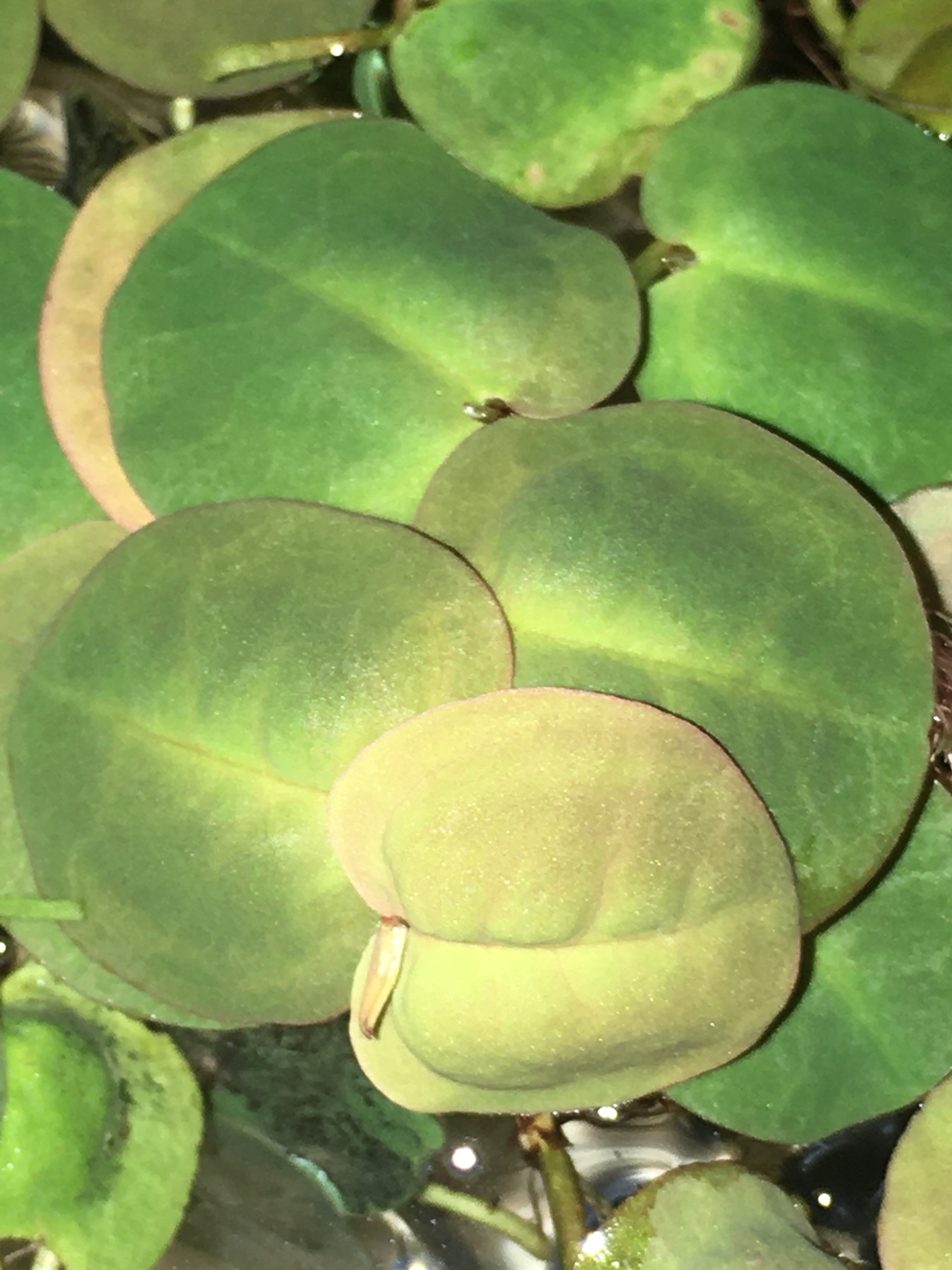
Big leaves due to right conditions

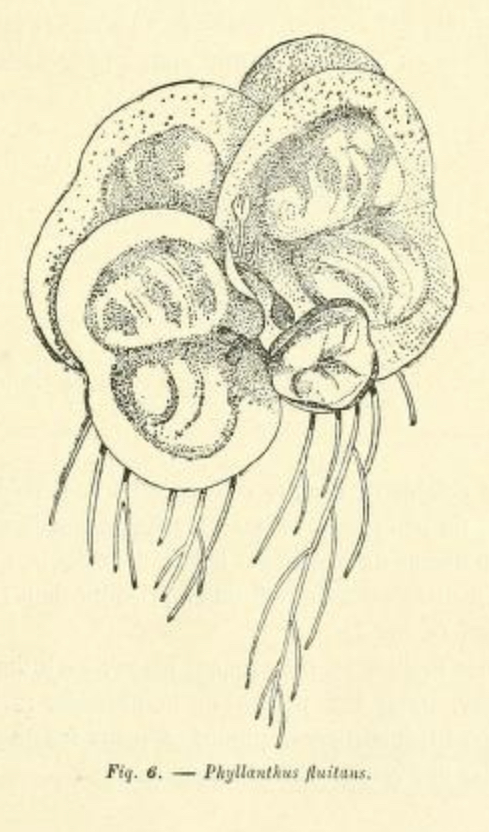
Another image of the illustration of P. fluitans by R. C. used by Herbier Bossier

== See also ==
- List of freshwater aquarium plant species
- Aquatic plants
- List of Phyllanthus species
- Salvinia effect
