= African payal =

African payal is a common name for several aquatic plants which are invasive in India:

- Salvinia auriculata, native to the Americas
- Salvinia molesta
