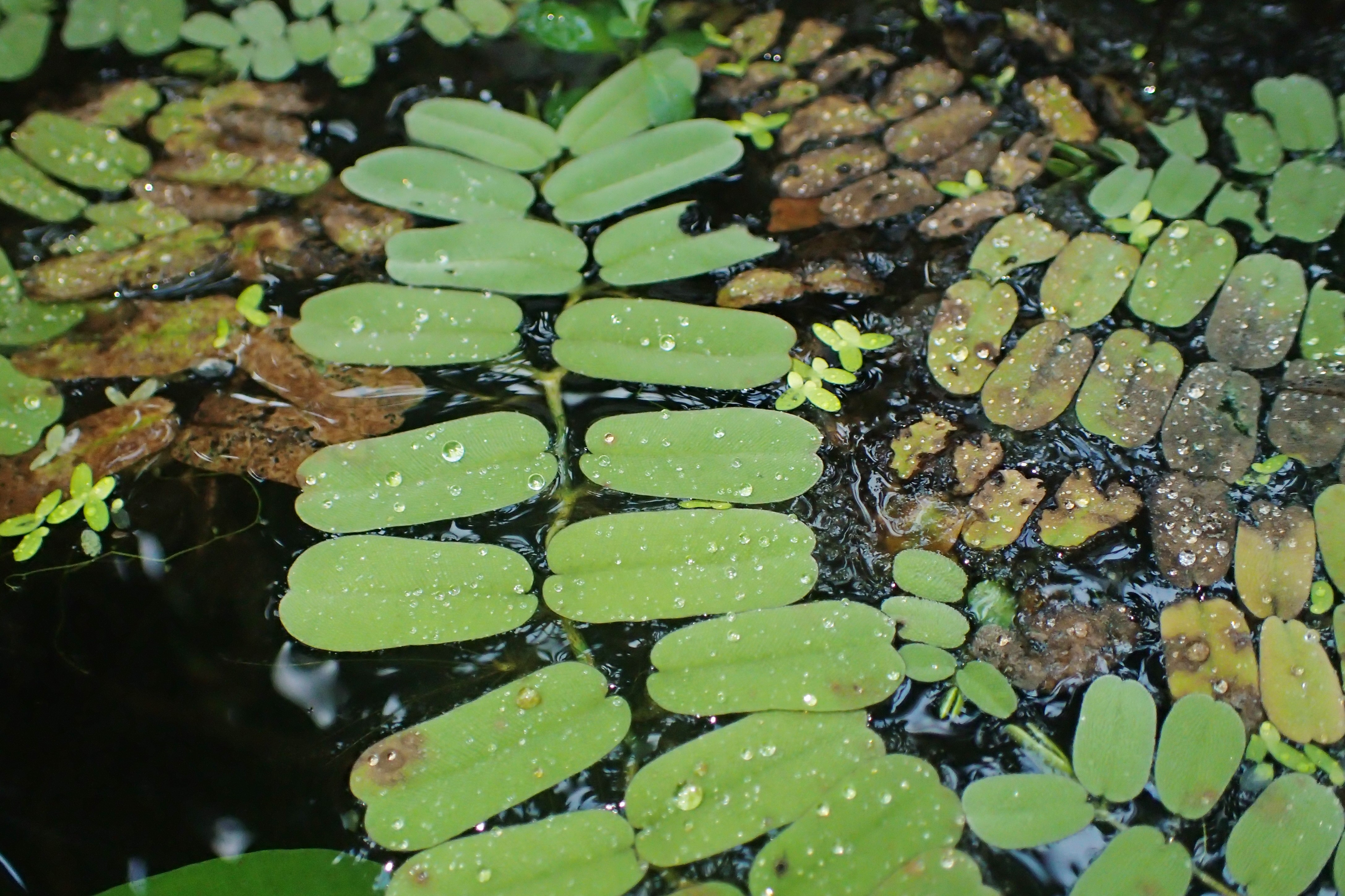
- Salvinia oblongifolia floating on the surface of water.

Scientific classification
- Kingdom: Plantae
- Clade: Embryophytes
- Clade: Tracheophytes
- Division: Polypodiophyta
- Class: Polypodiopsida
- Order: Salviniales
- Family: Salviniaceae
- Genus: Salvinia
- Species: S. oblongifolia

Binomial name
- Salvinia oblongifolia Martius

= Salvinia oblongifolia =

Species of waterfern

Salvinia oblongifolia is a species of plant in the Salviniaceae. Its leaves can grow with up to 6 cm long and 2.5 cm wide, making it the largest species in the genus Salvinia. Leaves are rectangular and approximately three times as long as wide with short blunt papillae that are arranged in double rows on the upper leaf surface, which make for easy identification.

This species is native to Eastern Brazil, where it can be found growing on shallow, stagnant water bodies, where it can form dense, nearly pure colonies in lagoon habitats. Introduced populations have been found in the state of California in the United States.
