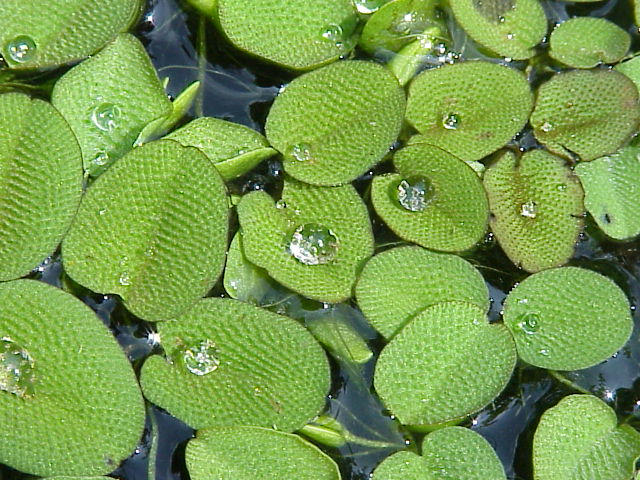
- Salvinia minima

Scientific classification
- Kingdom: Plantae
- Clade: Tracheophytes
- Division: Polypodiophyta
- Class: Polypodiopsida
- Order: Salviniales
- Family: Salviniaceae
- Genus: Salvinia; Ség.

Type species
- Salvinia natans (L.) All.

Species
- See text

= Salvinia =

Salvinia Temporal range: Maastrichtian to Present

Genus of aquatic plants

Salvinia or watermosses is a genus of free-floating aquatic ferns in the family Salviniaceae. The genus is named in honor of 17th-century Italian naturalist Anton Maria Salvini, and the generic name was first published in 1754 by French botanist Jean-François Séguier in Plantae Veronenses, a description of the plants found around Verona. Twelve species are recognized, at least three of which (S. molesta, S. herzogii, and S. minima) are believed to be hybrids in part because their sporangia are found to be empty.

Salvinia is related to the other water ferns, including the mosquito fern Azolla. Recent sources include both Azolla and Salvinia in Salviniaceae, although each genus was formerly given its own family.

Salvinia, like the other ferns in order Salviniales, are heterosporous, producing spores of differing sizes. However, leaf development in Salvinia is unique. The upper side of the floating leaf, which appears to face the stem axis, is morphologically abaxial.

Salvinia cucullata was one of the first fern two species for which a reference genome had been published. The Salvinia genome is characterized by its small size and few chromosomes. Recent work has found that genome variation in the group is primarily driven by transposable element activity and chromosomal rearrangements rather than by whole genome duplication.

== Description ==
Small, floating aquatics with creeping stems, branched, bearing hairs on the leaf surface papillae but no true roots. Leaves are in trimerous whorls, with two leaves green, sessile or short-petioled, flat, entire and floating, and one leaf finely dissected, petiolate, rootlike and pendent. Submerged leaves bearing sori that are surrounded by basifixed membranous indusia (sporocarps).

They bear sporocarps of two types, either megasporangia that are few in number (approximately 10), each with single megaspore, or many microsporangia, each with 64 microspores. Spores are of two kinds and sizes, both globose, trilete. Megagametophytes and microgametophytes protruding through sporangium wall; megagametophytes floating on water surface with archegonia directed downward; microgametophytes remaining fixed to sporangium wall.

The small, hairlike growths, known as trichomes or microgametical follicles, are not known to have any productive function, and are currently a biological mystery.

== Phylogeny ==
Phylogeny of Salvinia

- - African/Eurasian clade
    - Salvinia natans L.
    - - - Salvinia hastata Desv.
        - Salvinia cucullata Roxb. ex Bory & Bél.
      - Salvinia nymphellula Desv.
  - American clade
    - minima clade
      - Salvinia sprucei Kuhn
      - Salvinia minima Baker
    - auriculata clade
      - Salvinia oblongifolia Mart.
      - - Salvinia biloba Raddi
        - Salvinia auriculata Aubl.
        - Salvinia radula Baker
        - Salvinia sp. nov. fide Schwartsburd

Other species include:
- S. ×delasotae Miranda & Schwartsburd 2019 {Salvinia sprucei × Salvinia minima}
- S. martynii Kopp
- S. nuriana de la Sota

Salvinia molesta comes out in the auriculata clade but is a hybrid of two progenitor species that are either extinct or unknown.

== Evolutionary history ==
The geography of Salvinia fossil material suggests members of the genus may have been broadly distributed during the Tertiary. The oldest confirmed Salvinia fossil comes from the late Cretaceous (Maastrichtian) of Mexico.

== Distribution ==
Distribution is mostly tropical, in North America, Mexico, West Indies, Central America, South America, Eurasia and Africa, including Madagascar, South Borneo, Asia.

== Economic impacts ==
Giant salvinia (Salvinia molesta) is a commonly introduced invasive weed in warm climates, but is native to South America. It grows rapidly, up to two times its dry weight in 2 1/2 days, and forms dense mats over still waters. A tiny weevil, Cyrtobagous salviniae, has been used successfully to biologically control giant salvinia.

One proposed use takes advantage of the hydrophobic trichomes, which do not repel oil. This makes them candidates for mopping up oil spills, as they become saturated with oil in thirty seconds. S. molesta trichomes served as a model for a similarly hydrophobic synthetic polycarbonate.

== Salvinia effect ==
The salvinia effect describes the stabilization of an air layer upon a submerged hydrophobic (water-repellent) surface by hydrophilic (water loving) pins. This physic-chemical phenomenon was discovered on the floating fern Salvinia molesta by the botanist Wilhelm Barthlott (University of Bonn) while working on the lotus effect and was described in cooperation with the physicist Thomas Schimmel (Karlsruhe Institute of Technology), fluid mechanist Alfred Leder (University of Rostock) and their colleagues in 2010.

== Sources ==
- USDA
- Salvinia minima in Flora of North America
- S. molesta as pest
