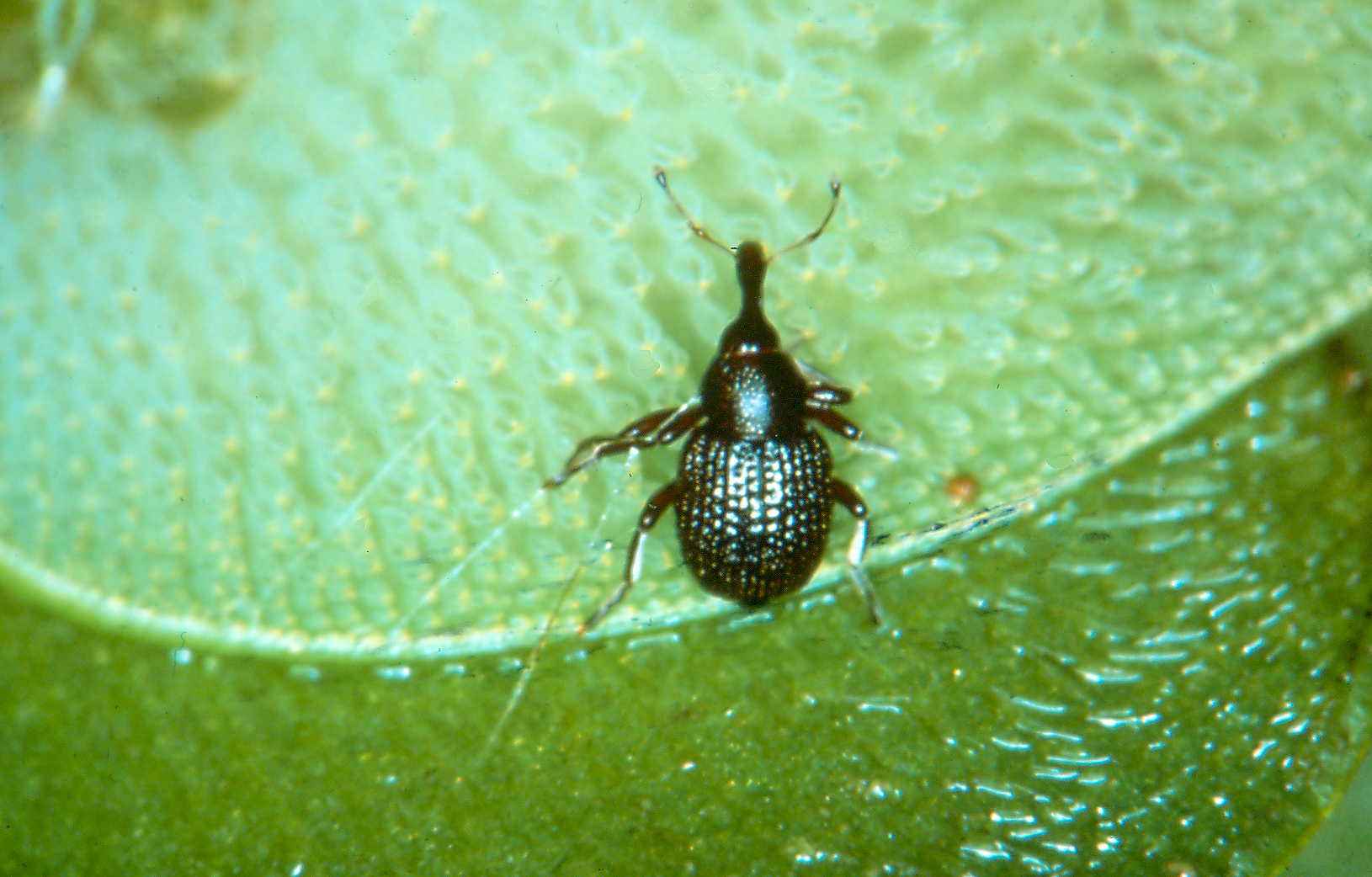

Scientific classification
- Kingdom: Animalia
- Phylum: Arthropoda
- Class: Insecta
- Order: Coleoptera
- Suborder: Polyphaga
- Infraorder: Cucujiformia
- Family: Brachyceridae
- Genus: Cyrtobagous
- Species: C. salviniae

Binomial name
- Cyrtobagous salviniae Calder & Sands, 1985

= Cyrtobagous salviniae =

Species of beetle

Cyrtobagous salviniae is a species of weevil known as the salvinia weevil. It is used as an agent of biological pest control against the noxious aquatic plant giant salvinia (Salvinia molesta).

The adult weevil is about 2 millimeters long. It is brown in color during its first few days of adult life and soon turns shiny black. The female lays over 300 eggs one by one in the lower leaves and rhizomes of the salvinia plant. The larva is white in color and about 4 millimeters long. It burrows through rhizomes and feeds voraciously on new buds, warping and stunting the plant until it eventually sinks. The larva pupates underwater amongst the rhizomes of the plants in a cocoon it weaves from root hairs. Adults also feed on the buds and leaves of the plant, but do less damage than the larvae.

This weevil is native to South America. It has been introduced to areas where giant salvinia is a problem. Early experimental successes occurred in parts of Africa and southeast Asia, and the weevil is now established in the southeastern United States and parts of Australia, along with the moth S. multiplicalis, as biological control for invasive water weeds. In many cases the weevil has cleared salvina infestations by 90% or more in under one year. Entire waterways have been unclogged by the weevil's feeding. It also feeds upon Salvinia minima, a related aquatic weed.

It is similar to the closely related Cyrtobagous singularis, but the two weevil species have slightly different ecologies and C. singularis is generally an ineffective substitute for C. salviniae.
