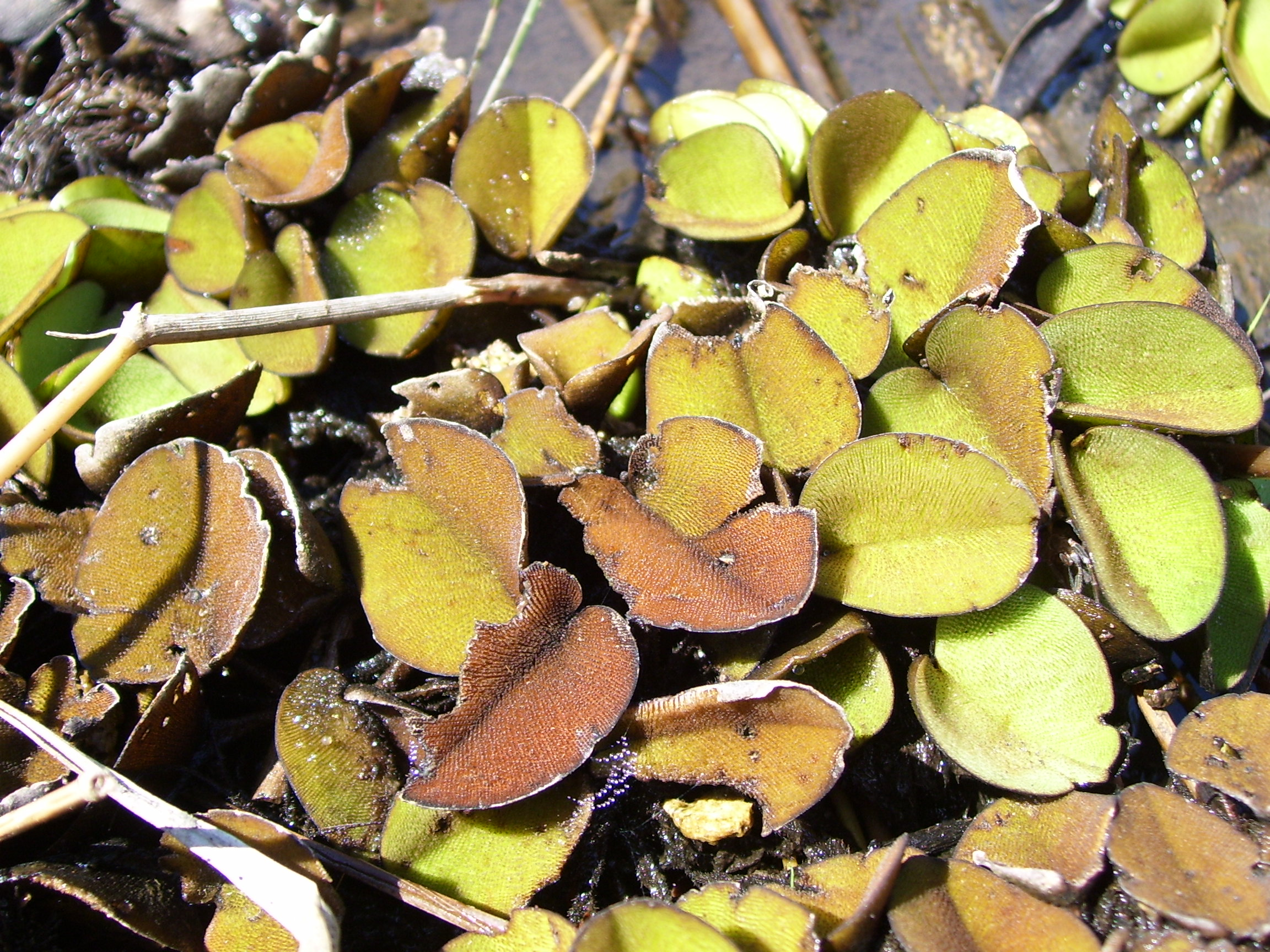

Conservation status
- Least Concern (IUCN 3.1)

Scientific classification
- Kingdom: Plantae
- Clade: Tracheophytes
- Division: Polypodiophyta
- Class: Polypodiopsida
- Order: Salviniales
- Family: Salviniaceae
- Genus: Salvinia
- Species: S. auriculata

Binomial name
- Salvinia auriculata Aubl.

= Salvinia auriculata =

Species of fern

Salvinia auriculata is a species of plant in the Salviniaceae known by the common names eared watermoss, African payal (Malayalam: ആഫ്രിക്കൻ പായൽ), and butterfly fern. It is native to the Americas from Mexico south to Argentina and Chile. It is cultivated as an ornamental plant and it has become naturalized in the wild in some places.

This species is hard to distinguish from other Salvinia. The plant varies in size depending on how crowded it is among other plants.

This plant has long been known as an invasive species. It had infested the Zambezi River by 1949. It is also considered invasive in New Caledonia.

== Gallery ==
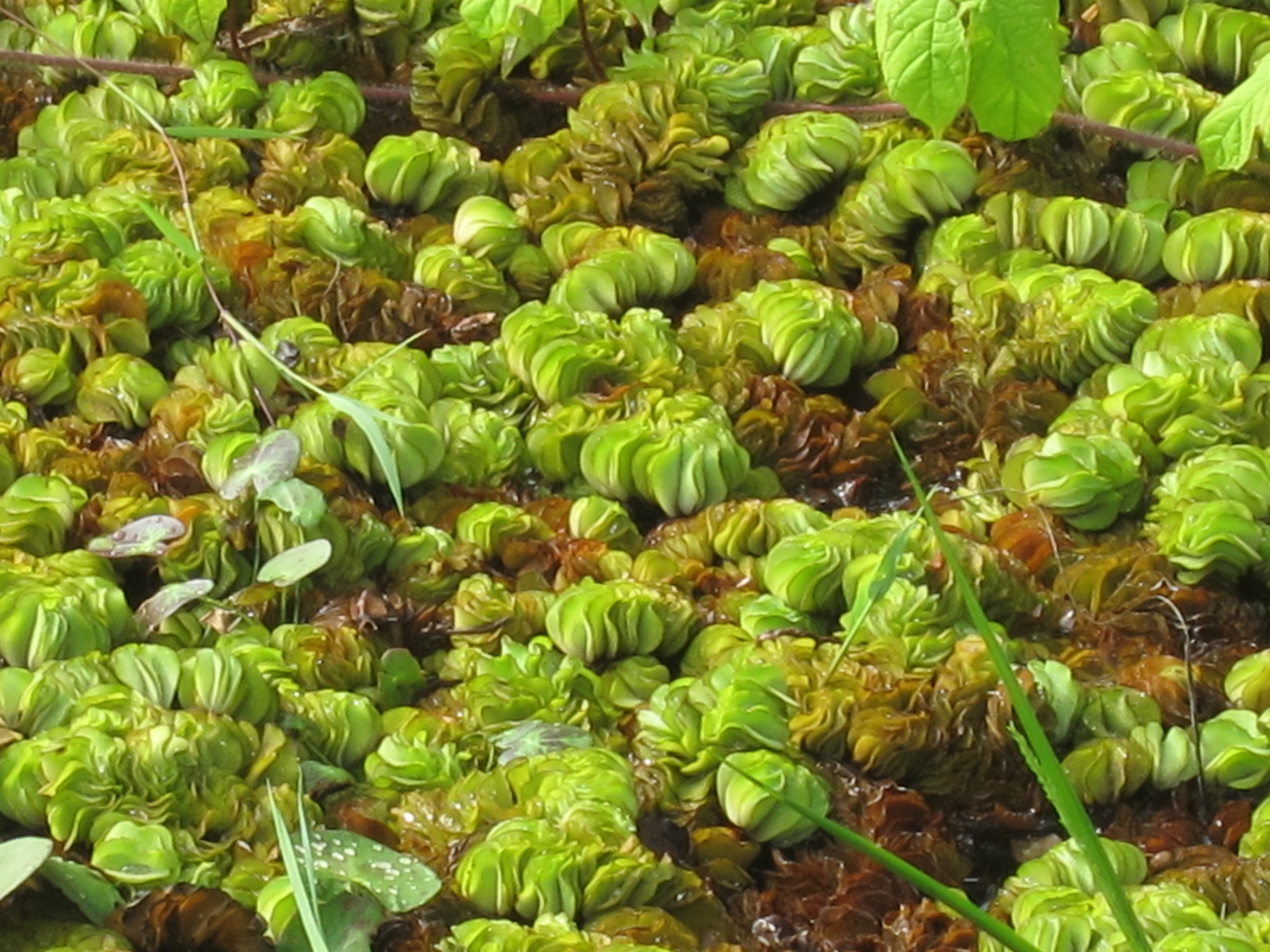

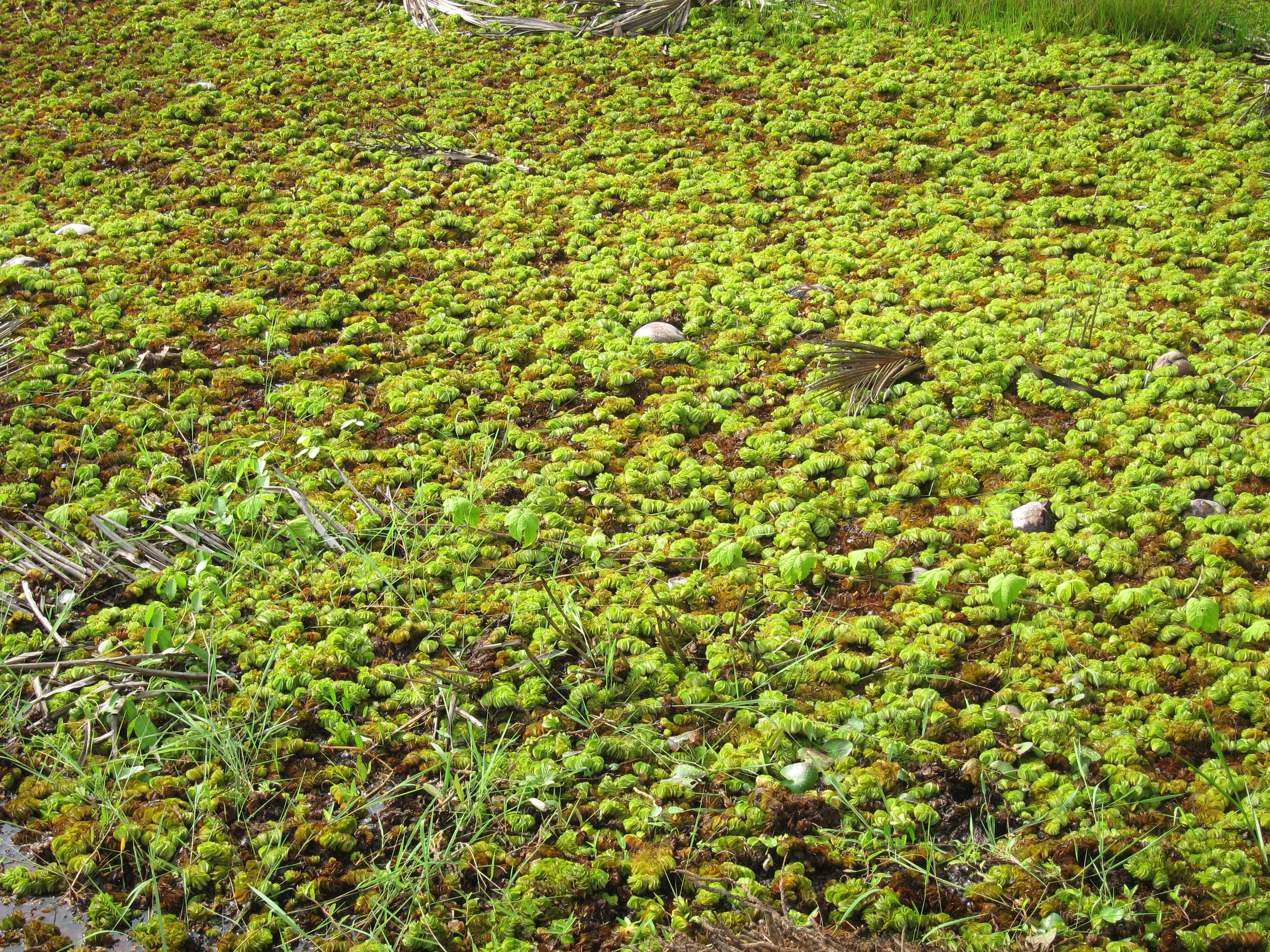

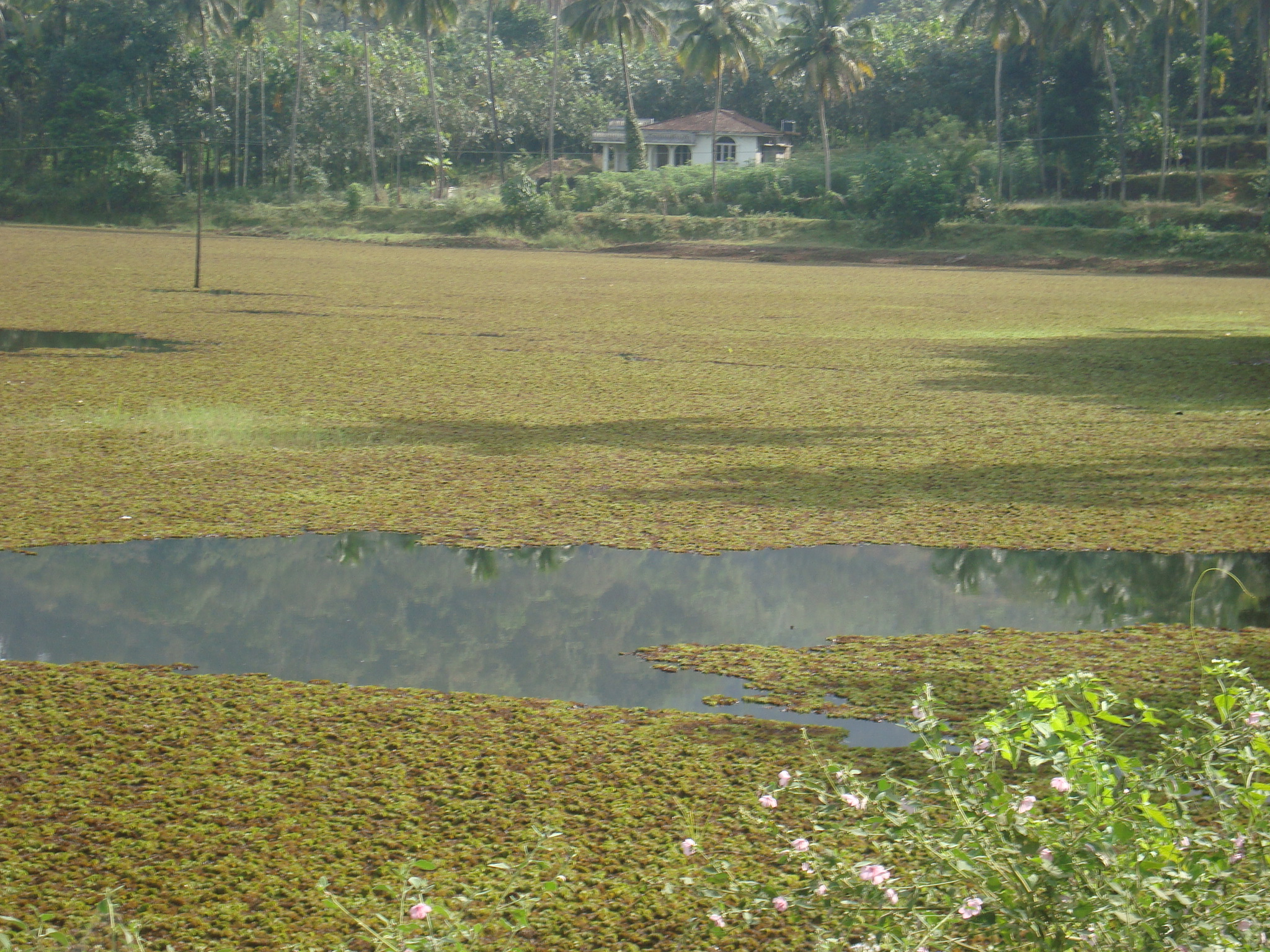

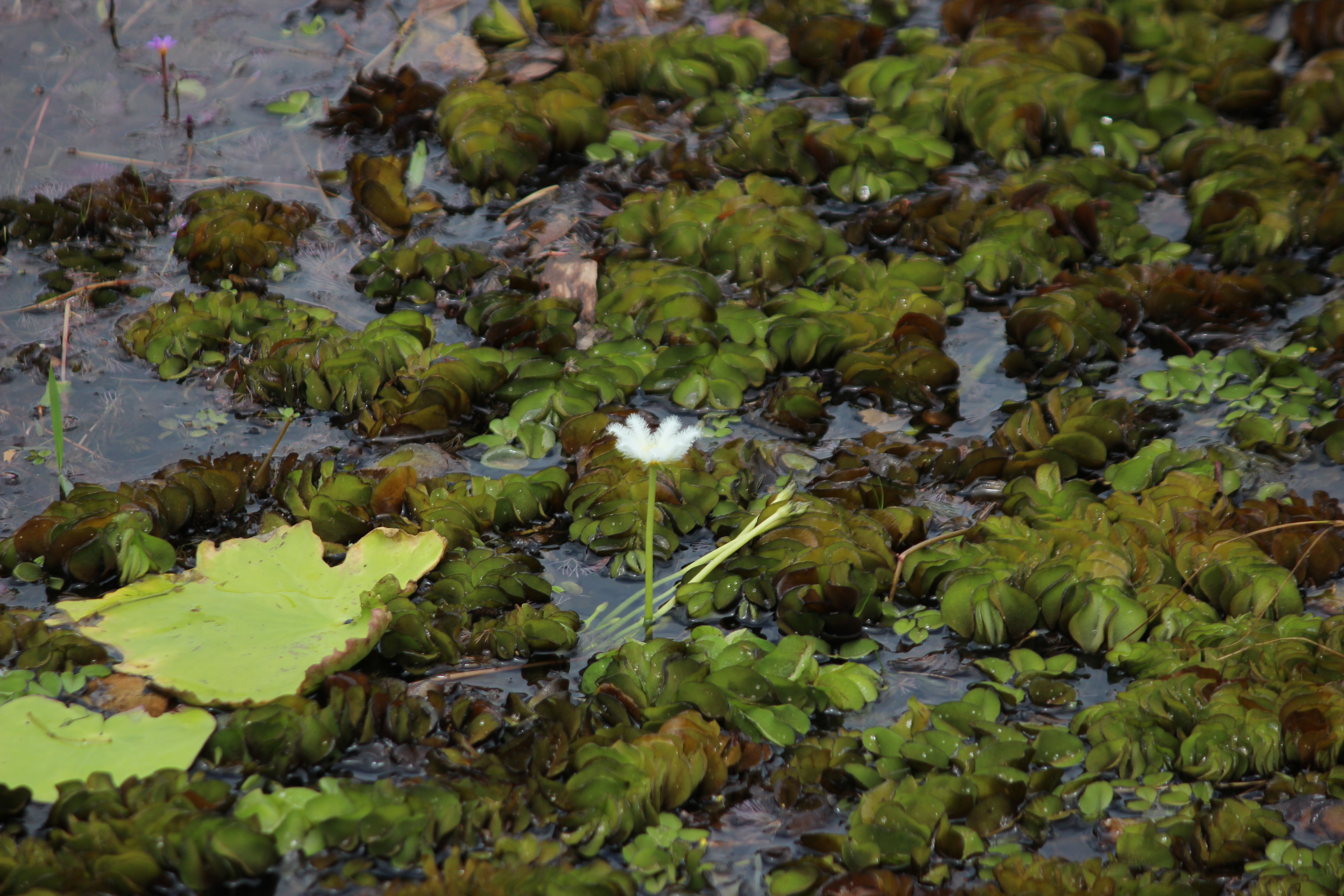

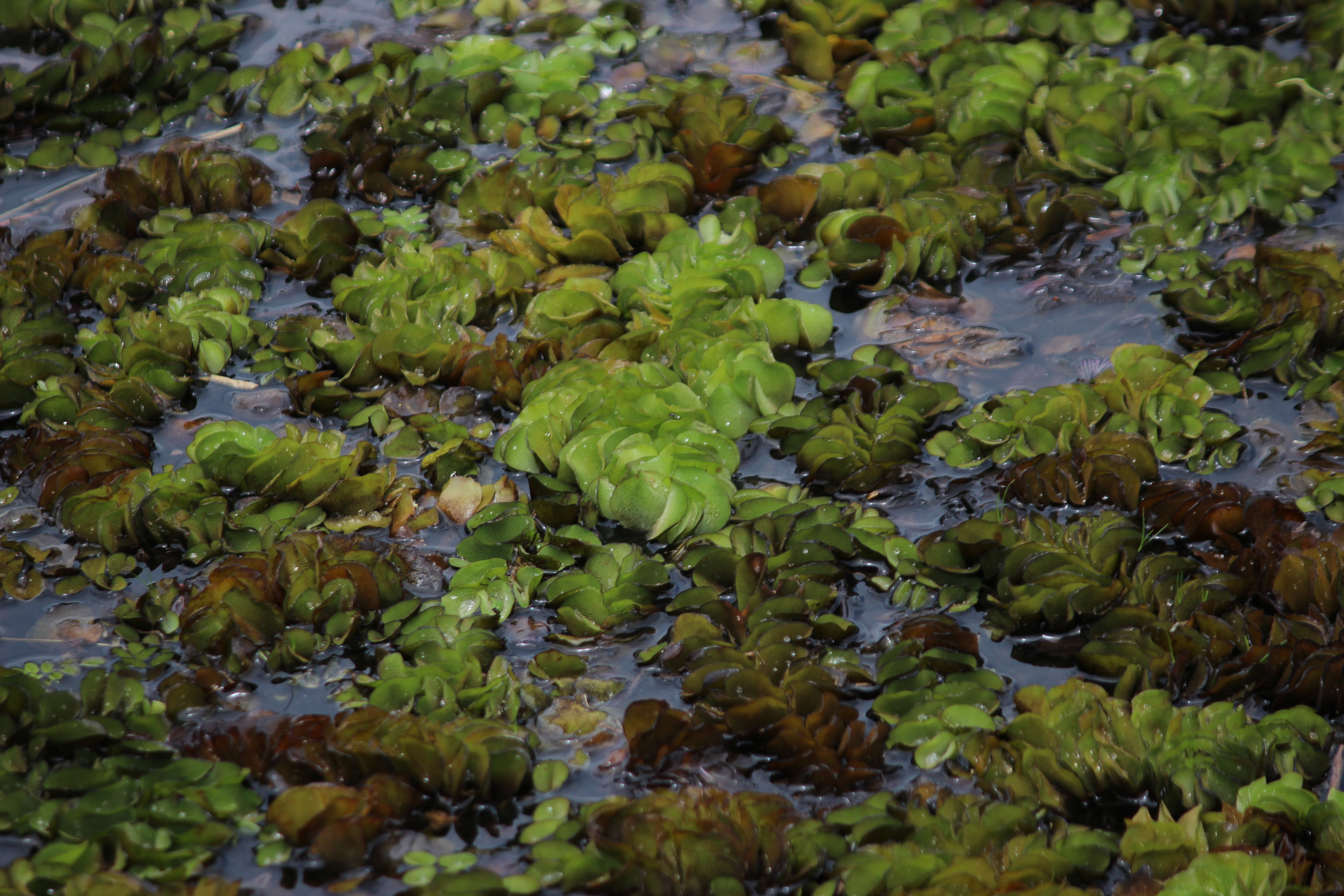

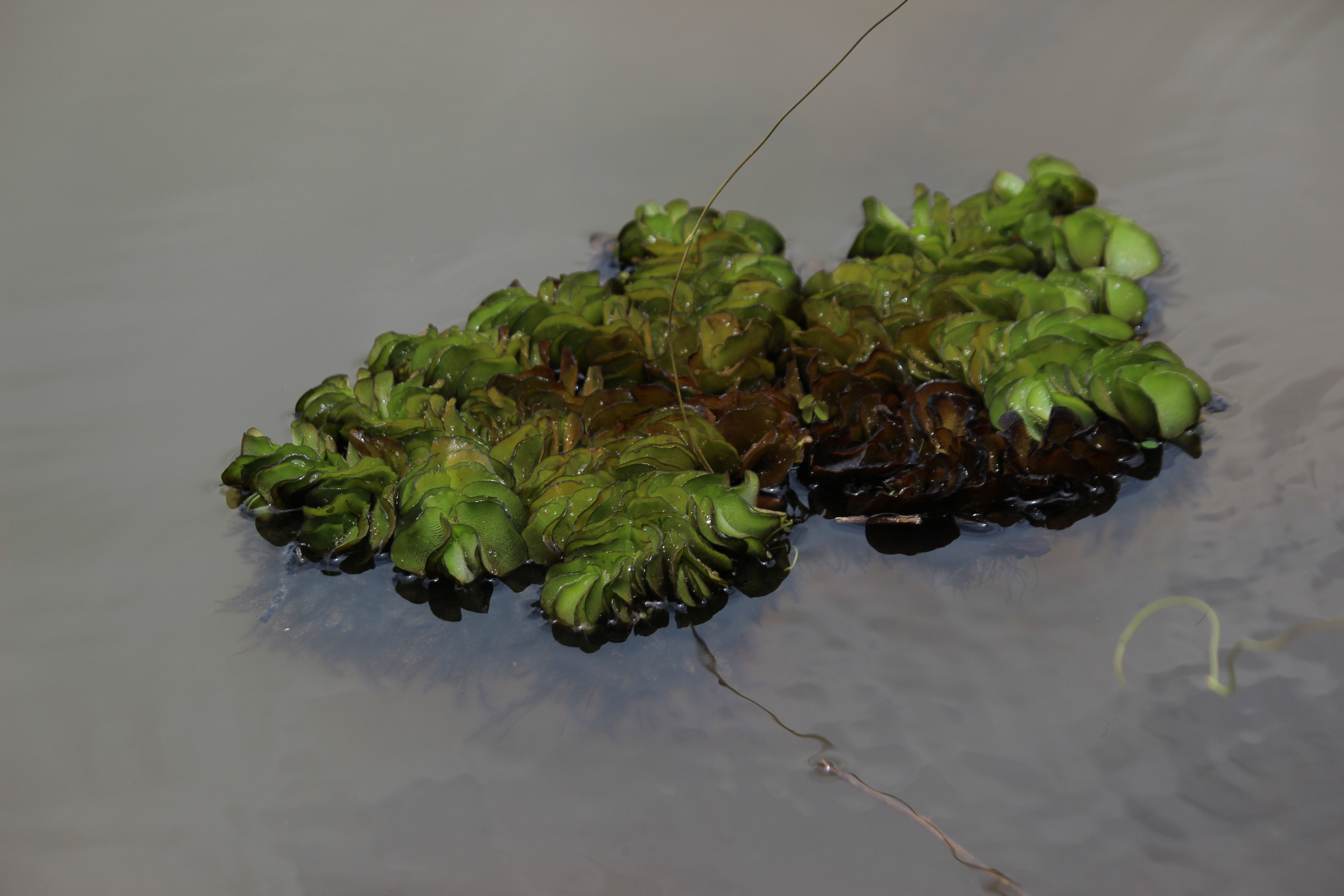

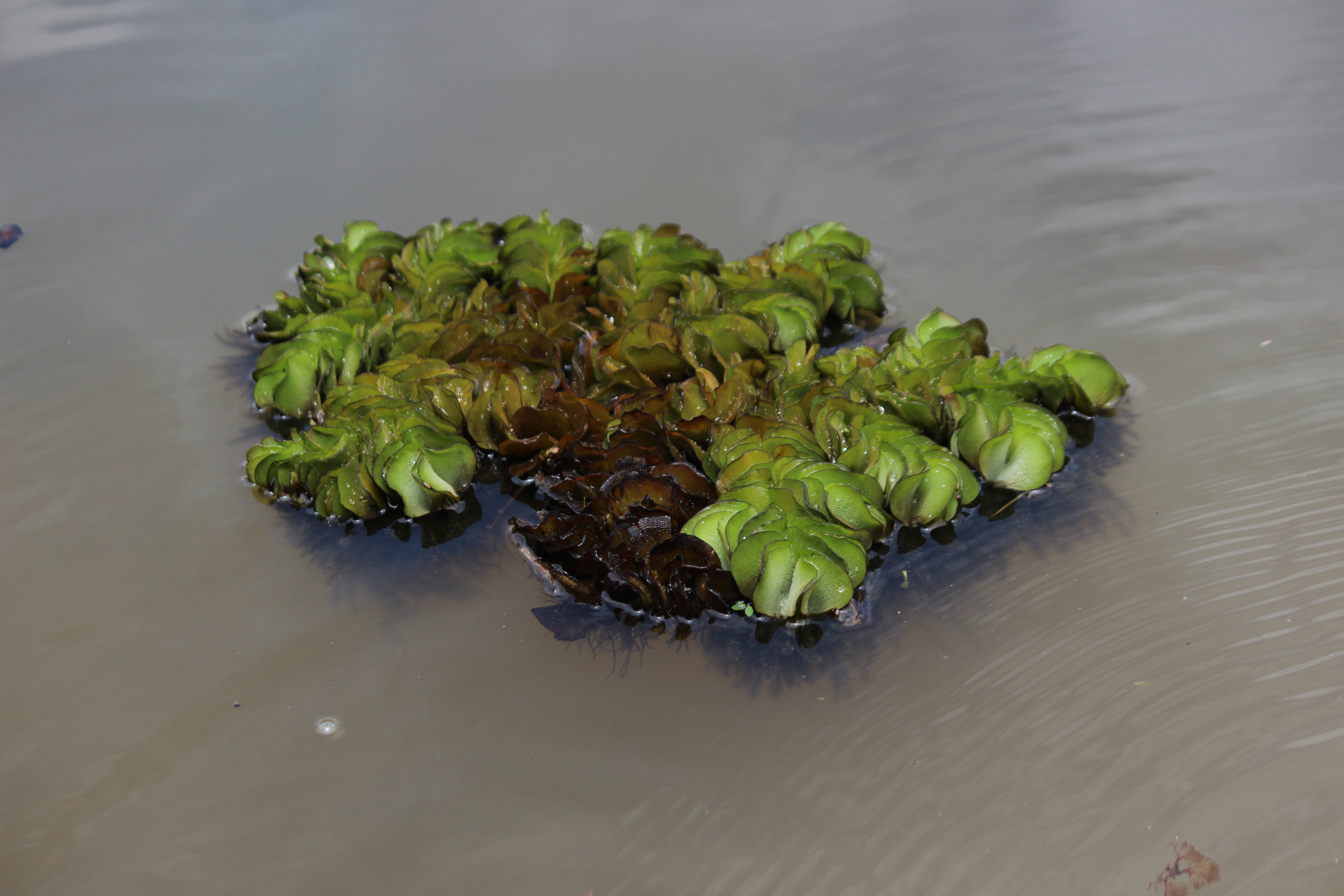
