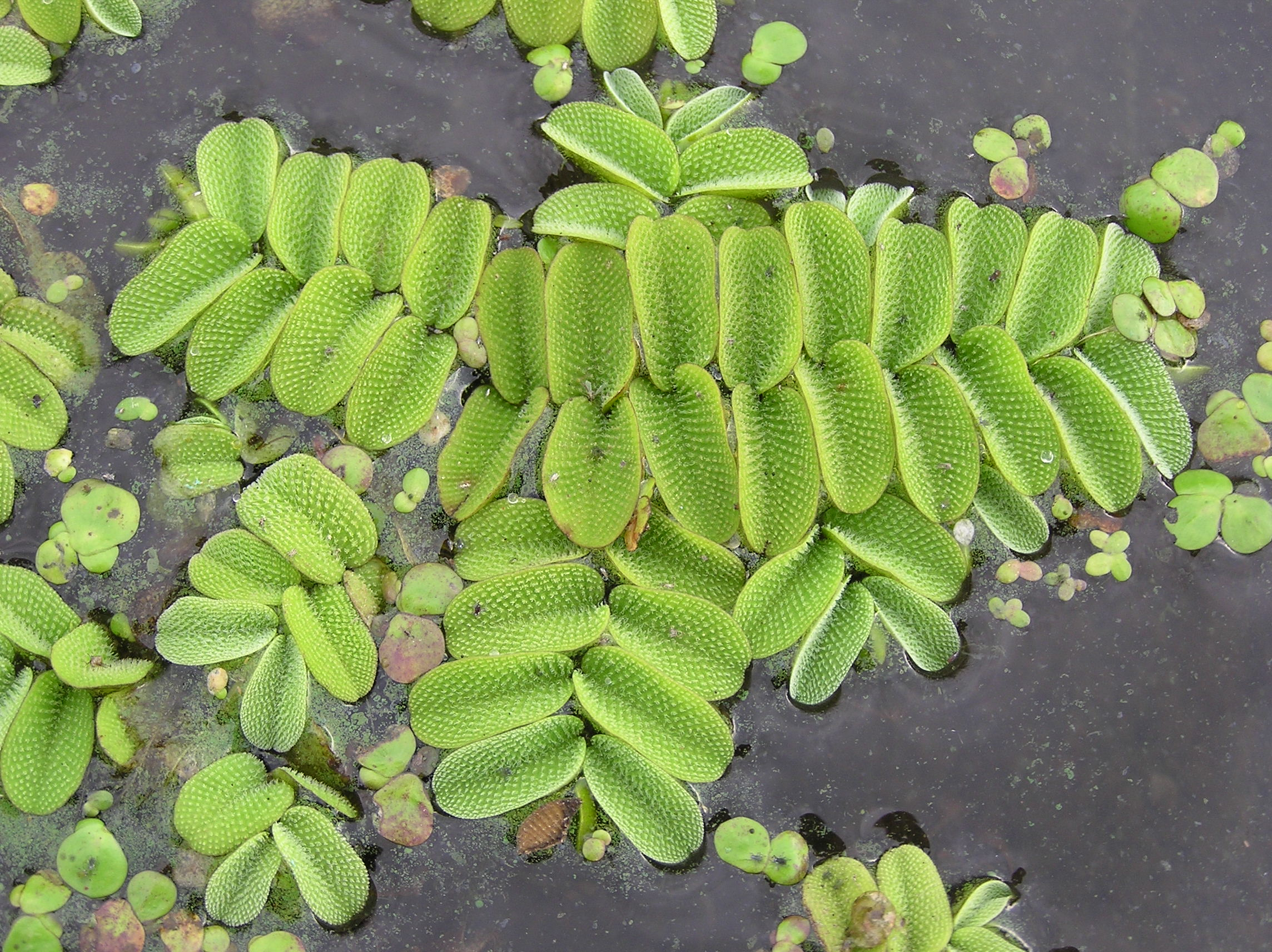

Conservation status
- Least Concern (IUCN 3.1)

Scientific classification
- Kingdom: Plantae
- Clade: Tracheophytes
- Division: Polypodiophyta
- Class: Polypodiopsida
- Order: Salviniales
- Family: Salviniaceae
- Genus: Salvinia
- Species: S. natans

Binomial name
- Salvinia natans (L.) All.

Synonyms
- Marsilea natans L. (basionym)

= Salvinia natans =

Floating fern

Species of aquatic plant

Salvinia natans (commonly known as floating fern, floating watermoss, floating moss, or commercially, water butterfly wings) is an annual floating aquatic fern, which can appear superficially similar to moss. It is found throughout the world where there is plentiful standing fresh water, sunlight, and humid air, but is especially common in Africa, Asia and central Europe. In New York State and Massachusetts, it is an introduced species.

== Characteristics ==
Salvinia natans has two nickel-sized leaves lying flat against the surface of the water, and a third submerged leaf which functions as a root. Flotation is made possible by pouches of air within the leaves. Cuticular papillae on the leaves' surface keep water from interfering with the leaves' functioning, and serve to protect them from decay. Spore cases form at the plant's base for reproduction.

The leaves of S. natans block sunlight from reaching very far underwater. This is helpful to many freshwater fish, providing safe hiding places to breed in, but can interrupt the photosynthesis of many underwater plants. S. natans can eventually cover entire ponds or lakes without ecological competition, starving other plant species.

== Native distribution ==
Salvinia natans is widely distributed, being native to several continents. In Africa, S. natans is native to Algeria, Egypt, Libya, Morocco, and Tunisia. In Asia, the plant is native to Afghanistan, Azerbaijan, China, Cyprus, India, Indonesia, Iran, Iraq, Israel, Jordan, Kazakhstan, Lebanon, northwest Pakistan, the Russian Federation, Japan, Korea, Saudi Arabia, Syria, Taiwan, Thailand, Turkey, and Uzbekistan. In Europe, it is native to Belarus, Belgium, Bulgaria, Czech Republic, France, Germany, Hungary, Italy, Moldova, the Netherlands, Poland, Romania, the southern European portion of the Russian Federation, Slovakia, Spain, Ukraine, and the states within the former Yugoslavia. Data from archaeological sites and pollen cores has shown that the species commonly occurred in the Rhine/Meuse delta in the Netherlands during the Middle Holocene.

== Gallery ==
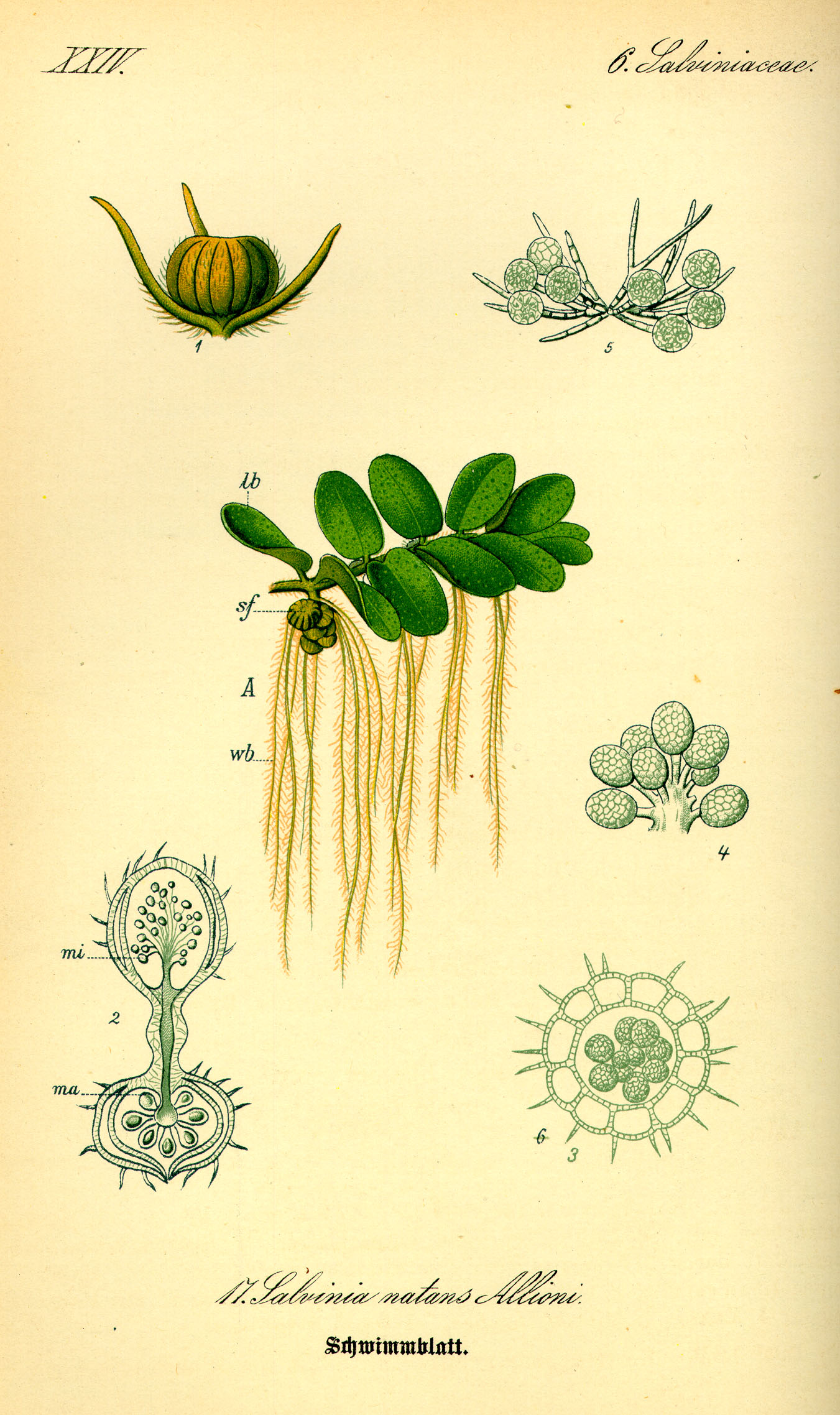

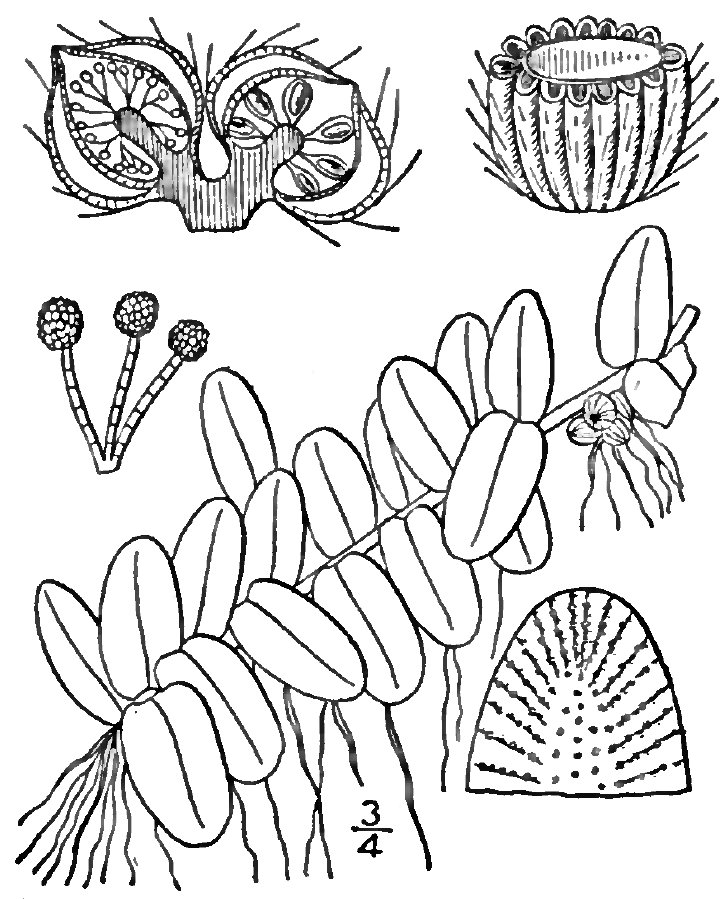

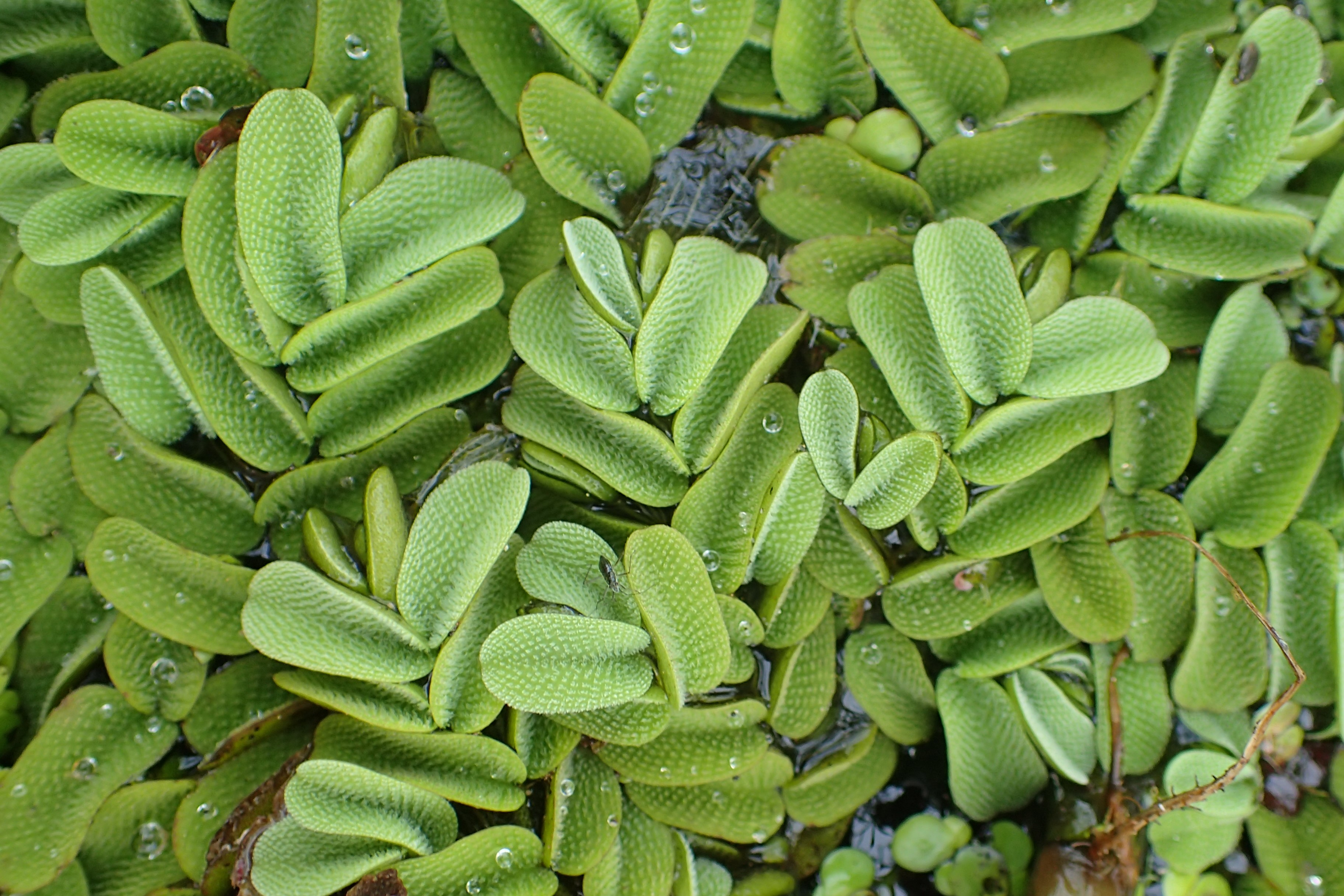

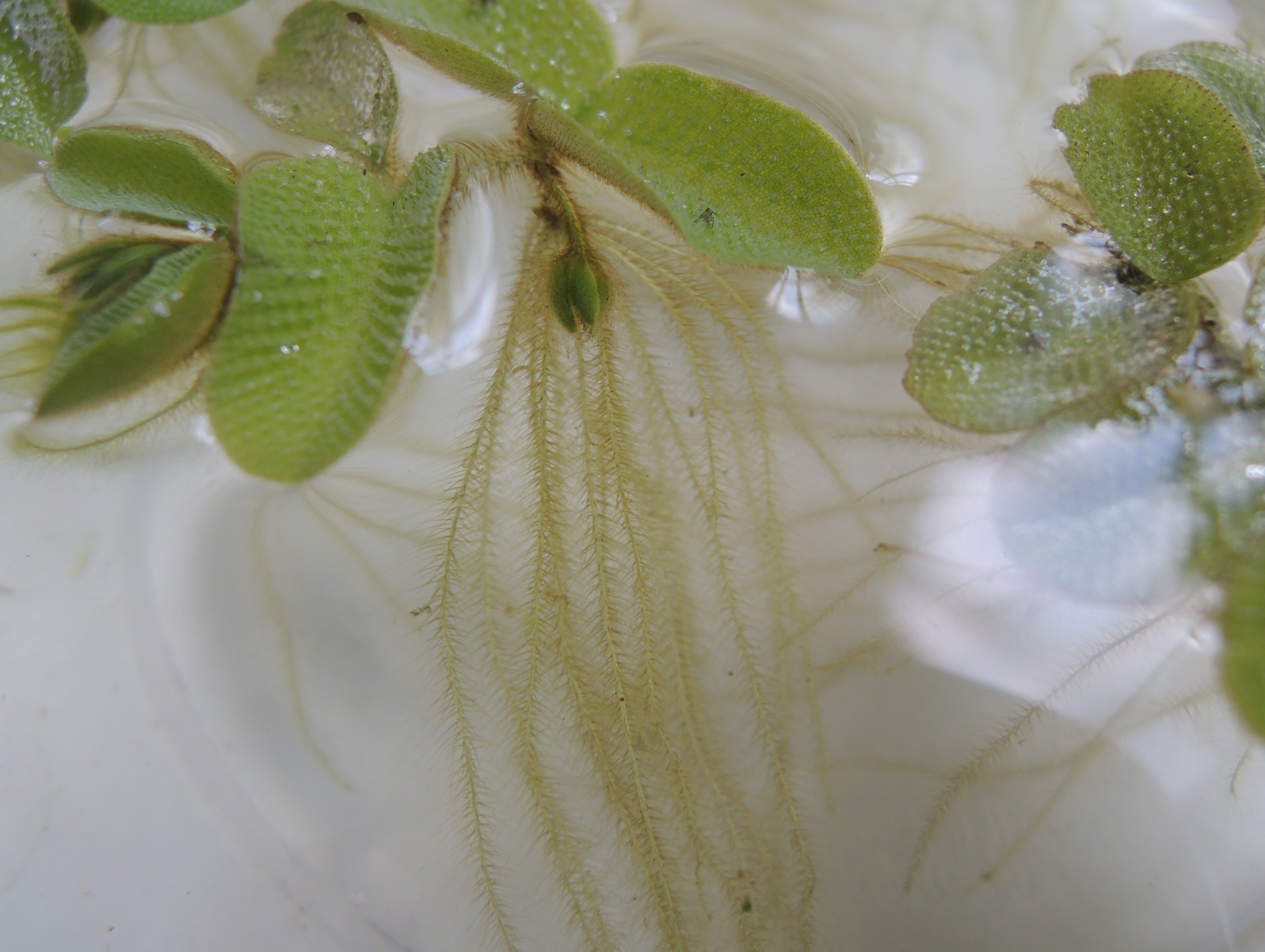

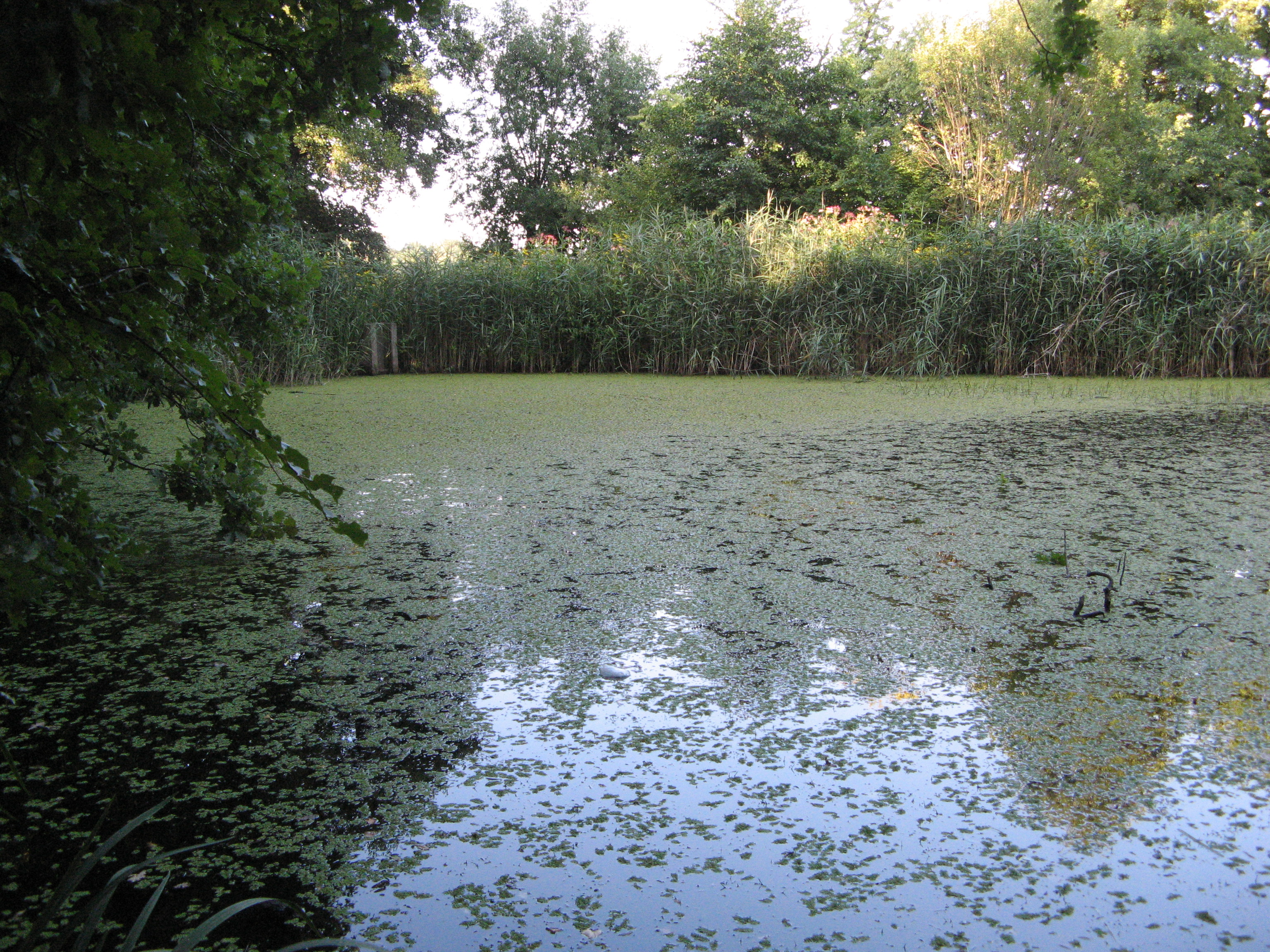

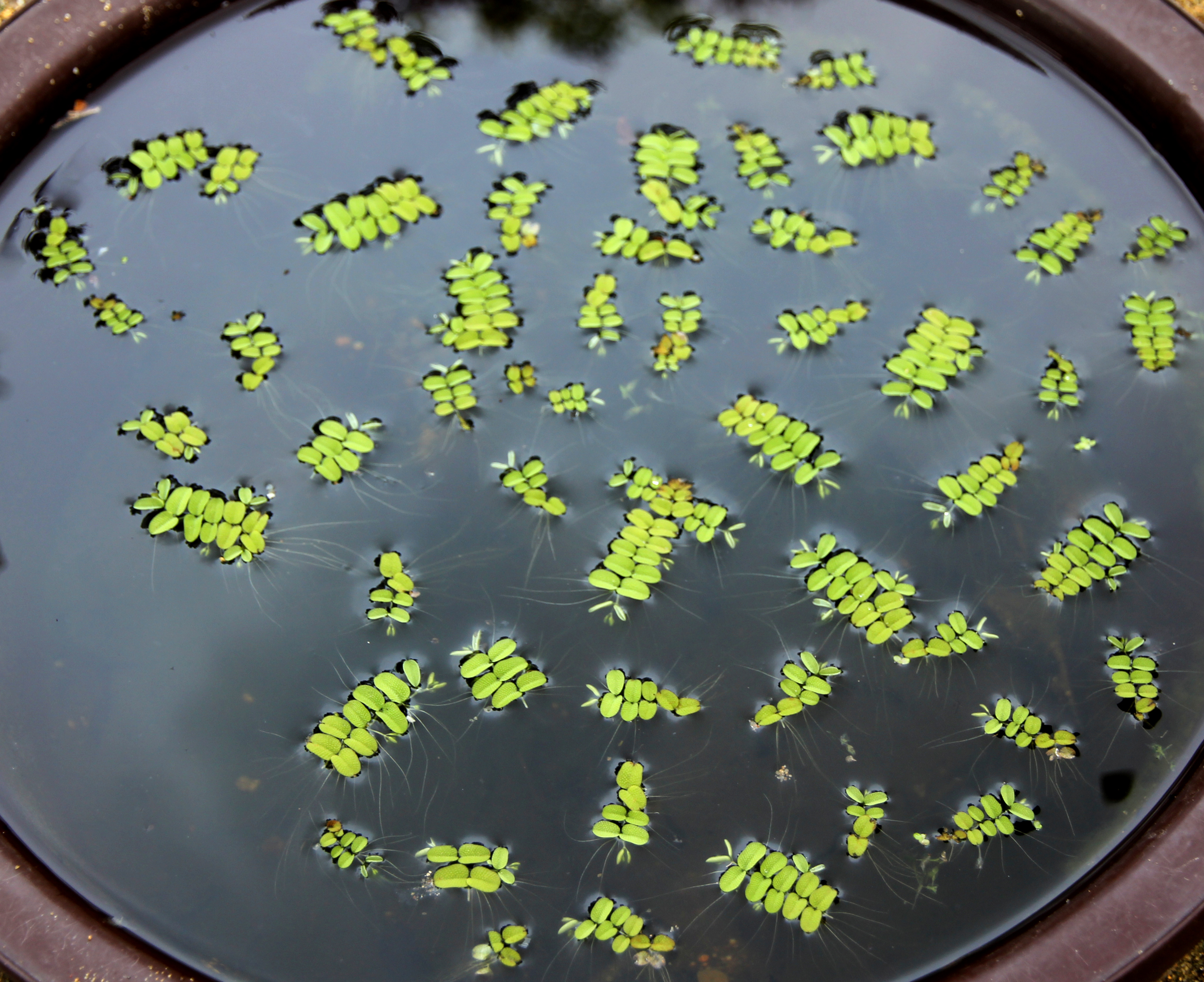

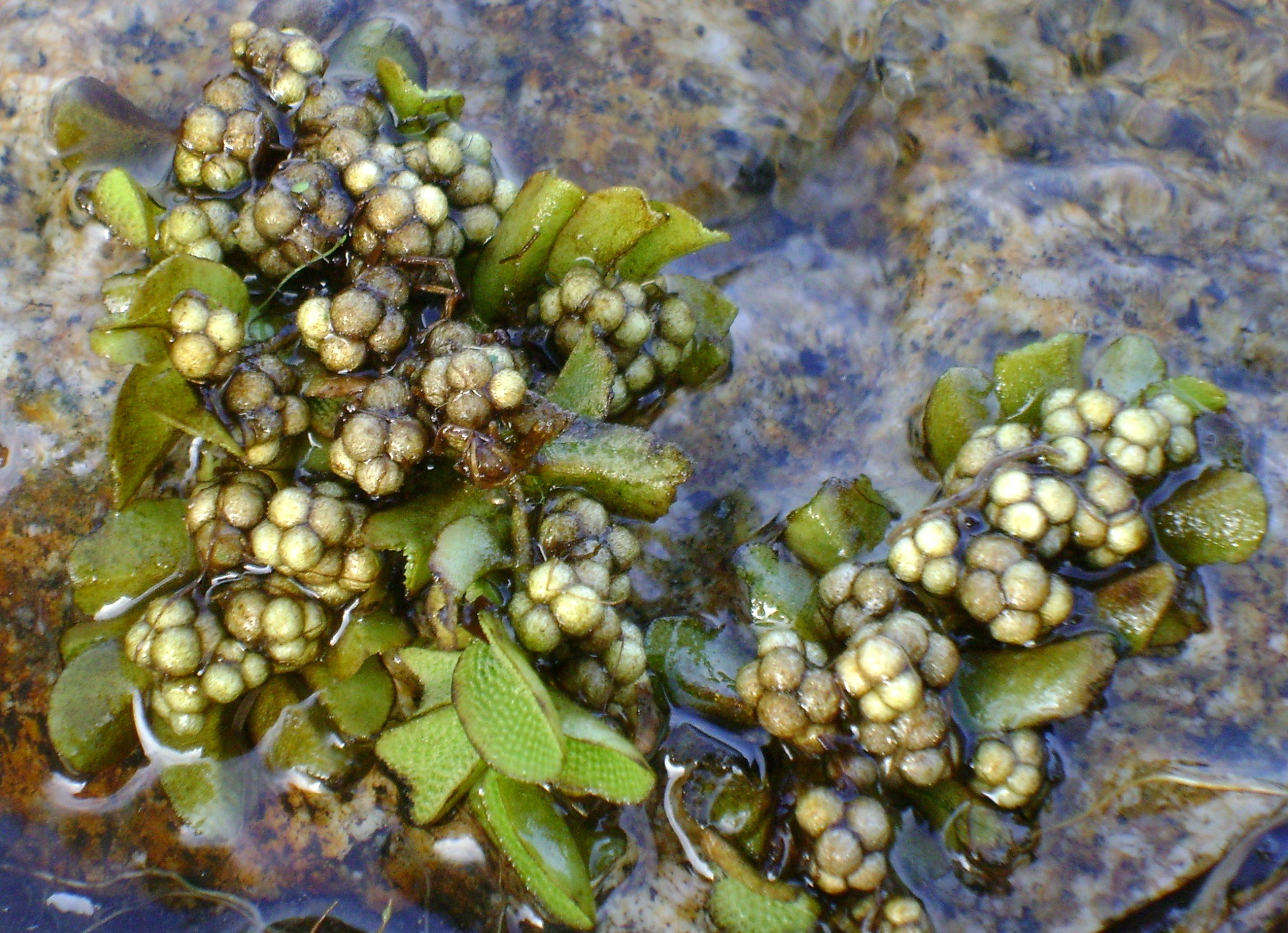

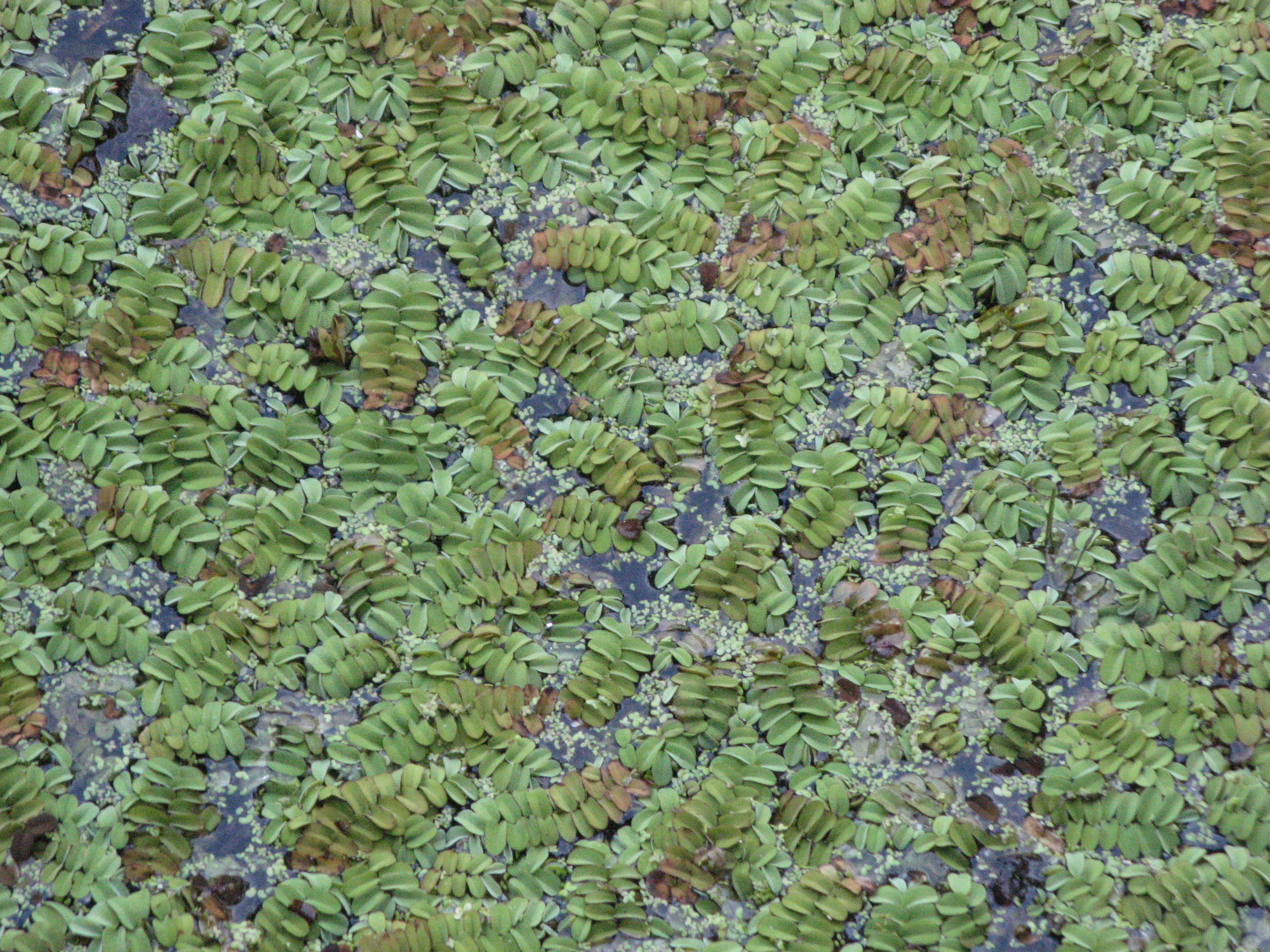
