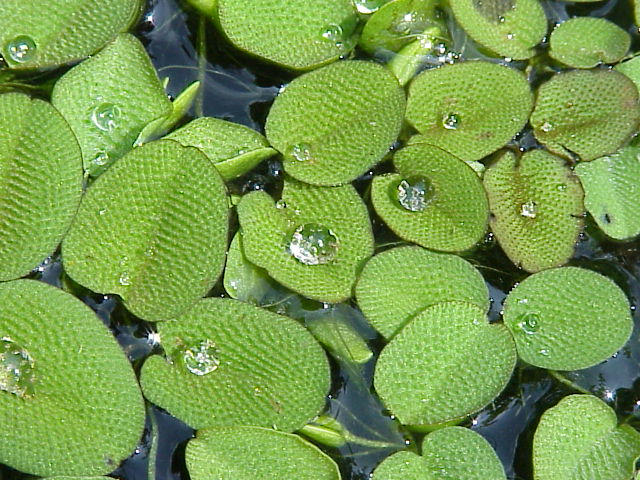
- Salvinia natans

Scientific classification
- Kingdom: Plantae
- Clade: Tracheophytes
- Division: Polypodiophyta
- Class: Polypodiopsida
- Order: Salviniales
- Family: Salviniaceae; Martinov

Genera
- Azolla; Salvinia

= Salviniaceae =

Salviniaceae Temporal range: Late Cretaceous–Recent

Family of ferns

Salviniaceae (/sælˌvɪniˈeɪsiˌiː/), is a family of heterosporous ferns in the order Salviniales. The Salviniaceae contain the two genera Azolla and Salvinia, with about 20 known species in total. The oldest records of the family date to the Late Cretaceous. Azolla was previously placed in its own family, Azollaceae, but research has shown Azolla and Salvinia to be sister genera with the likely phylogenic relationship shown in the following diagram.

- Salviniales
  - Marsileaceae
    - - Marsilea
    - - Pilularia
      - Regnellidium
  - Salviniaceae
    - - Azolla
      - Salvinia

The family has an extensive fossil record with many extinct genera dating back to the Cenomanian. Salviniaceous microfossils are characterized by megaspore floats, an acrolamella, and massulae. Fossil genera include Azollopsis, Parazolla, Paleoazolla, Glomerisporites, Ariadnaesporites, and Flagellisporites.
