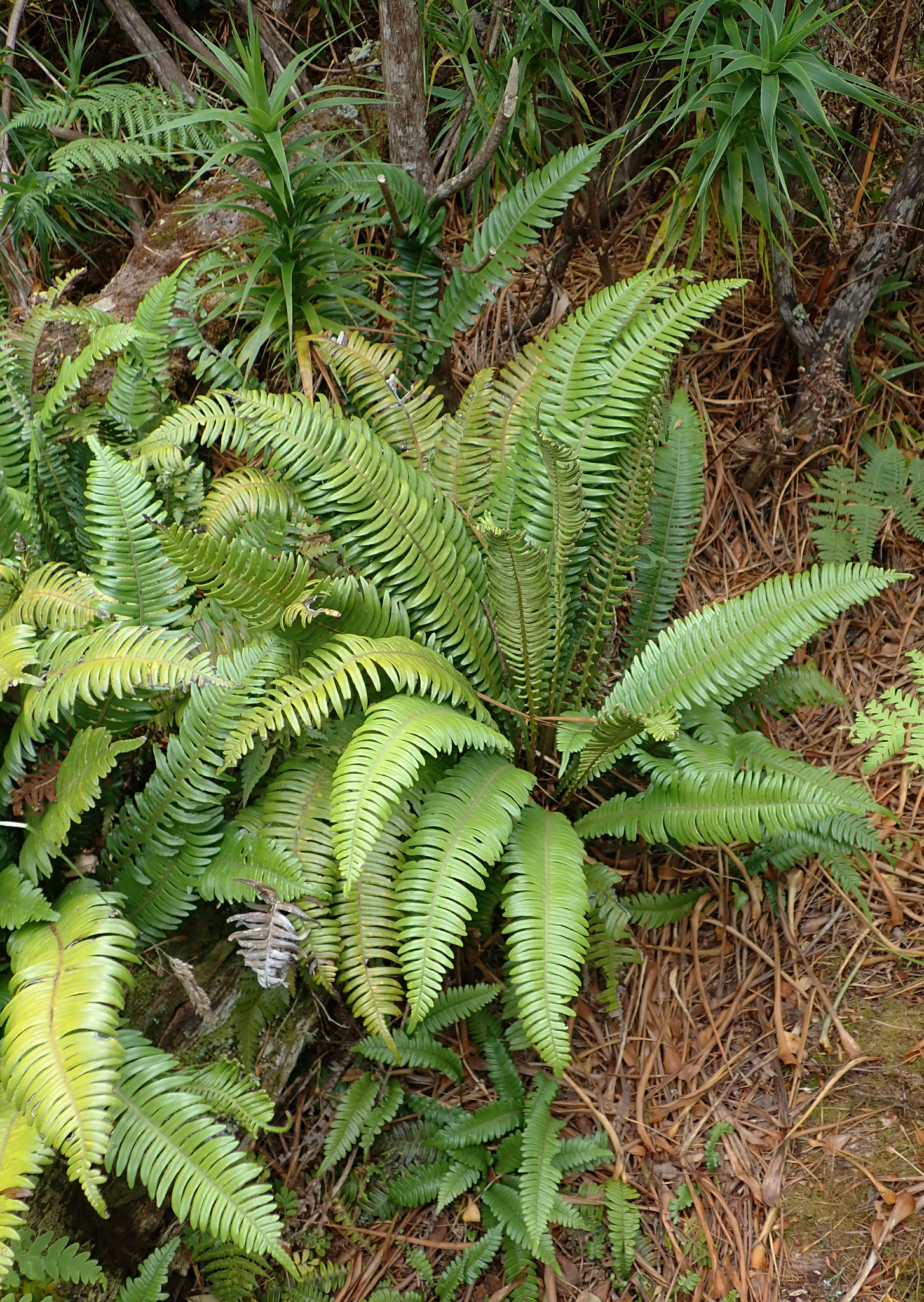

Scientific classification
- Kingdom: Plantae
- Clade: Tracheophytes
- Division: Polypodiophyta
- Class: Polypodiopsida
- Order: Polypodiales
- Suborder: Aspleniineae
- Family: Blechnaceae
- Genus: Austroblechnum
- Species: A. durum

Binomial name
- Austroblechnum durum (T.Moore) Gasper & V.A.O.Dittrich

Synonyms
- Blechnum durum (T.Moore) C.Chr.; Lomaria dura Moore; Lomaria rigida J.Sm.; Spicanta dura (T.Moore) Kuntze; Struthiopteris dura (T.Moore) Ching

= Austroblechnum durum =

Species of fern

Austroblechnum durum, synonym Blechnum durum, is a species of fern in the family Blechnaceae. The fern is endemic to New Zealand.

== Description ==
Thomas Moore described this species as follows:

Fronds pinnate below, lanceolate, fleshy coriaceous, 1 foot or more in length; pinnae or segments close with a narrow sinus, not confluent, obtuse, entire, somewhat marginate, the middle ones oblong, subfalcate, the upper diminished into an acuminate apex, the lower dwarfed into rounded lobes; veins forked, slightly club-shaped at the ends, lanceolate, abruptly caudate, with broadish crowded very blunt pinnae curving upwards, slightly decurrant on the anterior side, and there furnished with a minute free auricle; sori marginal; indisium narrow transversely wrinkled lacerato-fimbrate at the margin; caudex erect subarborecent; stipes and inch long, with ovate-lanceolate scales at the base, the rachis prominent and bluntly-keeled behind, furrowed at front.

== Taxonomy ==
This fern was first described by Moore in The Gardeners' Chronicle in 1866 as Lomaria dura. His description was based on a cultivated specimen collected by Henry H. Travers on the Chatham Islands in 1871.

== Distribution and habitat ==
A. durum has a somewhat restricted range in coastal forests from south of Okuru and the Haast River eastward to the Catlins area of the South Island. A. durum also is found on Stewart Island in the mixed hardwood/podocarp forest floor in association with Austroblechnum leyboldtianum, A. lanceolatum and A. colensoi.
