= Saale glaciation =

Glacial period in Europe

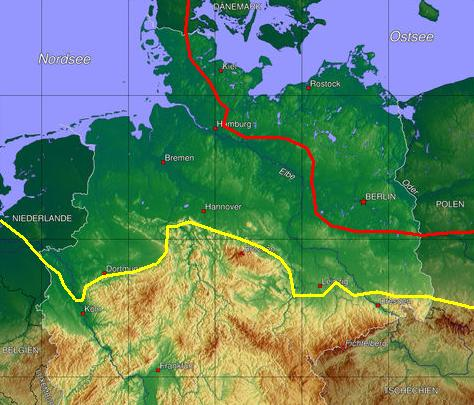
Maximum extent (Drenthe stadium) of the Saale complex (yellow line). The red line shows the greatest extent of the younger Weichselian glaciation.

The Saale glaciation or Saale Glaciation, sometimes referred to as the Saalian glaciation, Saale cold period (German: Saale-Kaltzeit), Saale complex (Saale-Komplex) or Saale glacial stage (called the Wolstonian Stage in Britain), covers the middle of the three large glaciations in Northern Europe and the northern parts of Eastern Europe, Central Europe and Western Europe by the Scandinavian Inland Ice Sheet. It follows the Holstein interglacial (Hoxnian Stage in Britain) and precedes the Eemian interglacial (globally known as the Last Interglacial and the Ipswichian in Britain), spanning from around 400,000 years ago to 130,000 years ago. The Saalian covers multiple glacial cycles punctuated by interglacial periods. In its latter part it is coeval with the global Penultimate Glacial Period.

== Age and definitions ==
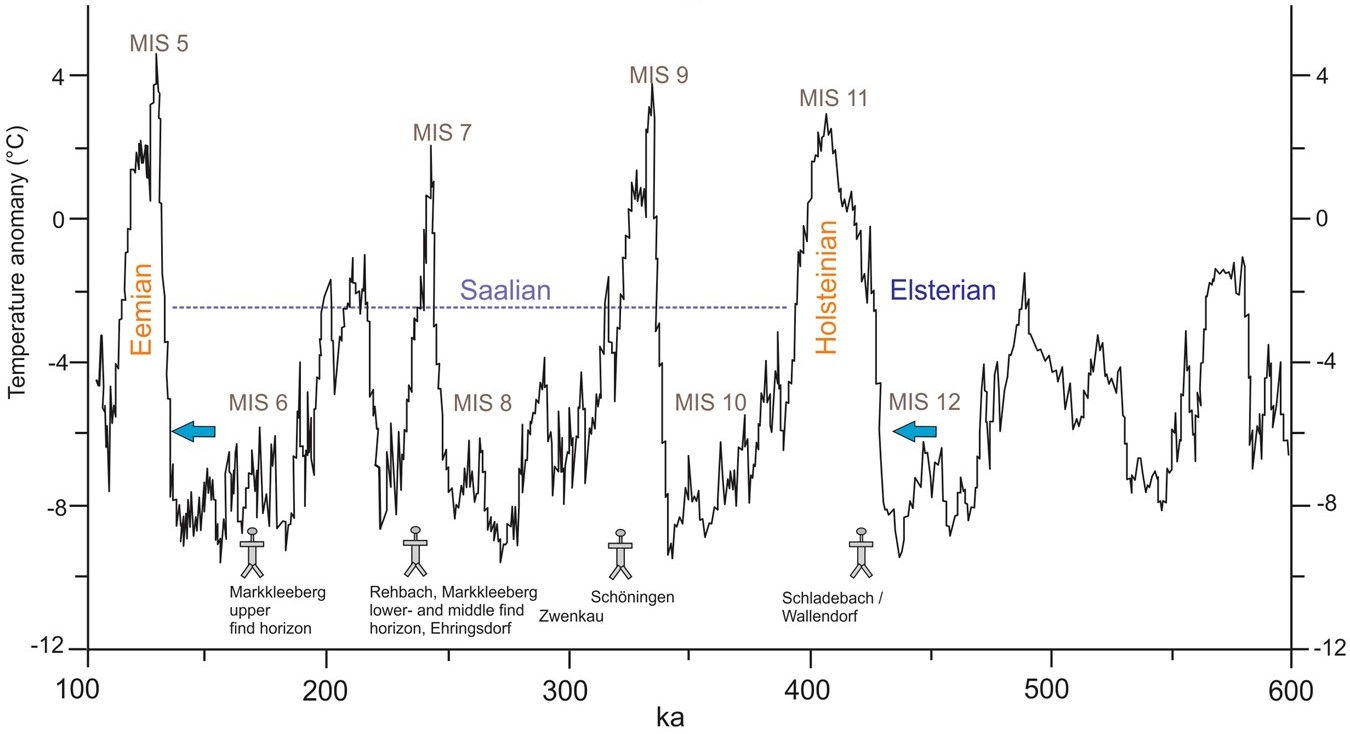
Graph showing glacial cycles in Europe from 600-100,000 years ago, with the Saalian period labelled

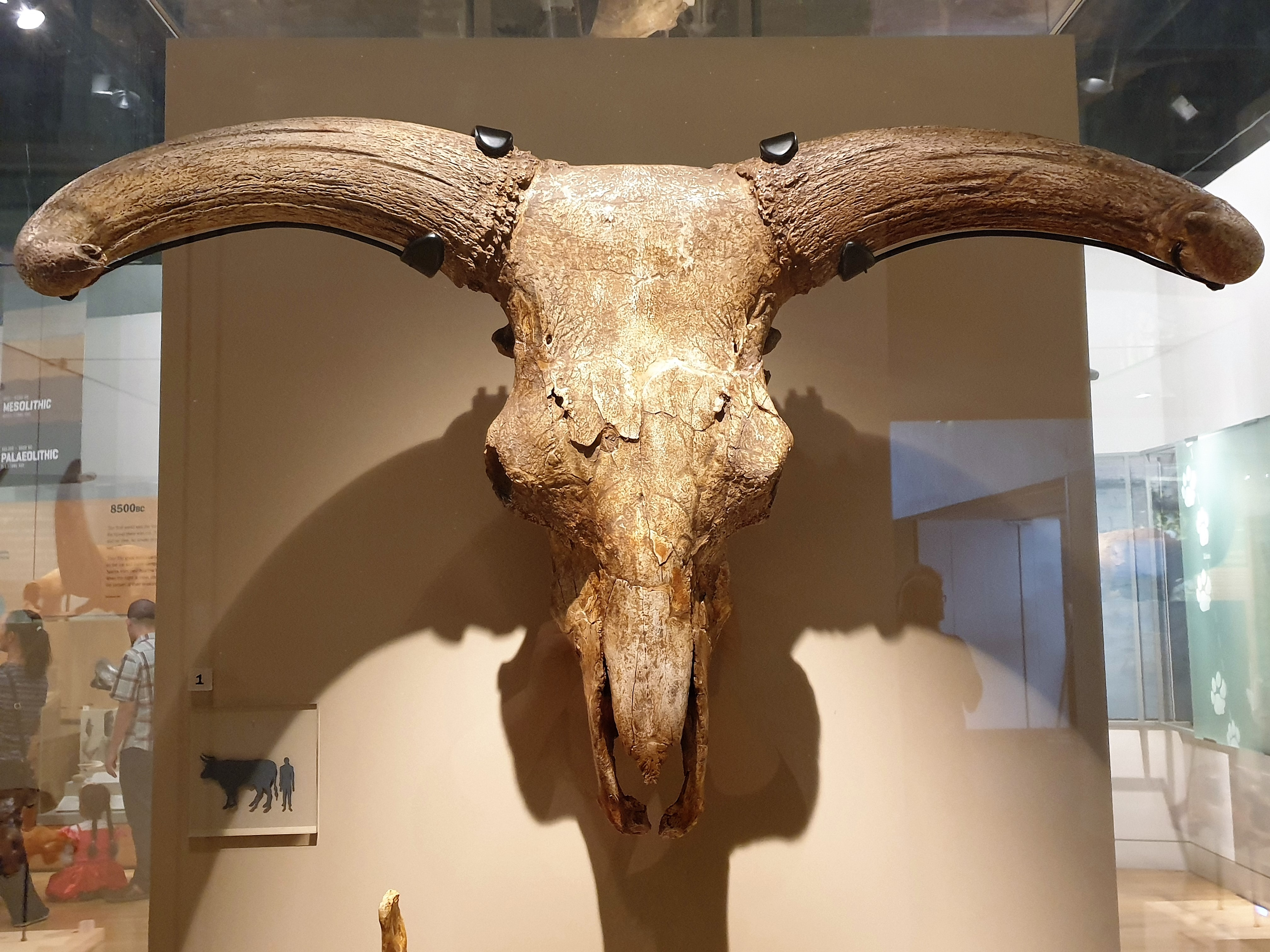
Aurochs skull from the Saale complex of Ilford, UK

The Saalian succeeded the Holstein interglacial and was followed by the Eemian interglacial (which began around 130,000 years ago) Though the start date of the Saalian was historically controversial, recent scholarship has suggested that the start date of the Saalian (and thus the end of the Holstein) is around 400,000 years ago. The Saalian encompasses multiple glacial cycles separated by interglacial periods. The first cold phase (Fuhne glacial) at the start of the Saale complexes is separated by a warmer period (Dömnitz interglacial) from the actual Saale "ice age". The term "Saale Ice Age" or "Saale Glacial" thus has 2 meanings in the literature – it sometimes refers to the phase in which the glacier advanced into North Germany, but can also refer to the whole Saale complex. The terms are frequently interchanged in the literature. (Note: A good example of the interchangeability of the terms is the now rather older standard work, Das Quartär Deutschlands, by Leopold Benda (ed.) Verlag Bornsträger Stuttgart dating to 1995. Here the Saale complex in the individual articles of this volume is variously described as the Saale cold period (Saale-Kaltzeit), Saale Glacial [Stage] (Saale-Glazial), Saale Complex (Saale-Komplex) and Saale Ice Age (Saaleeiszeit). The term Saale Ice Age (Saaleeiszeit) is used by one of the authors, Lothar Eissmann, in the sense of Saale complex (i.e. including the Fuhne cold period and Dömnitz warm period), not particularly restricted to the actual glacial period.)

The Saale Glaciation occurred at around the same time as the Wolstonian Stage in the British Isles and the Illinoian Stage in North America.

In 1910, the name for "Saale glaciation" was given by German geologists Jacob Stoller and Konrad Keilhack.

== Extent ==
The maximum advance of the ice sheet in North Germany during the Drenthe Stage is described by a line from Düsseldorf via Paderborn, Hamelin, Goslar, Eisleben, Zeitz and Meissen to Görlitz. From the eastern edge of the Harz eastwards (Poland, Brandenburg, Saxony and Saxony-Anhalt) the ice advanced to about 10 to 50 km behind the maximum extent of the Elster glaciation. On the northern edge of the Harz the two ice sheets reached the same line; and west of the Harz the ice of the Saale complex extended over 100 km further south than the ice sheet of the Elster. In front of this line, i.e. in front of the former glaciers, fluviatile and periglacial sediments are widespread. In the Drenthe Stage the present day North Sea basin, Great Britain and Ireland were also affected.

Several species were hurt by the glaciation, including the woolly mammoths, which suffered a reduction comparable to the one towards the end of the ice age.

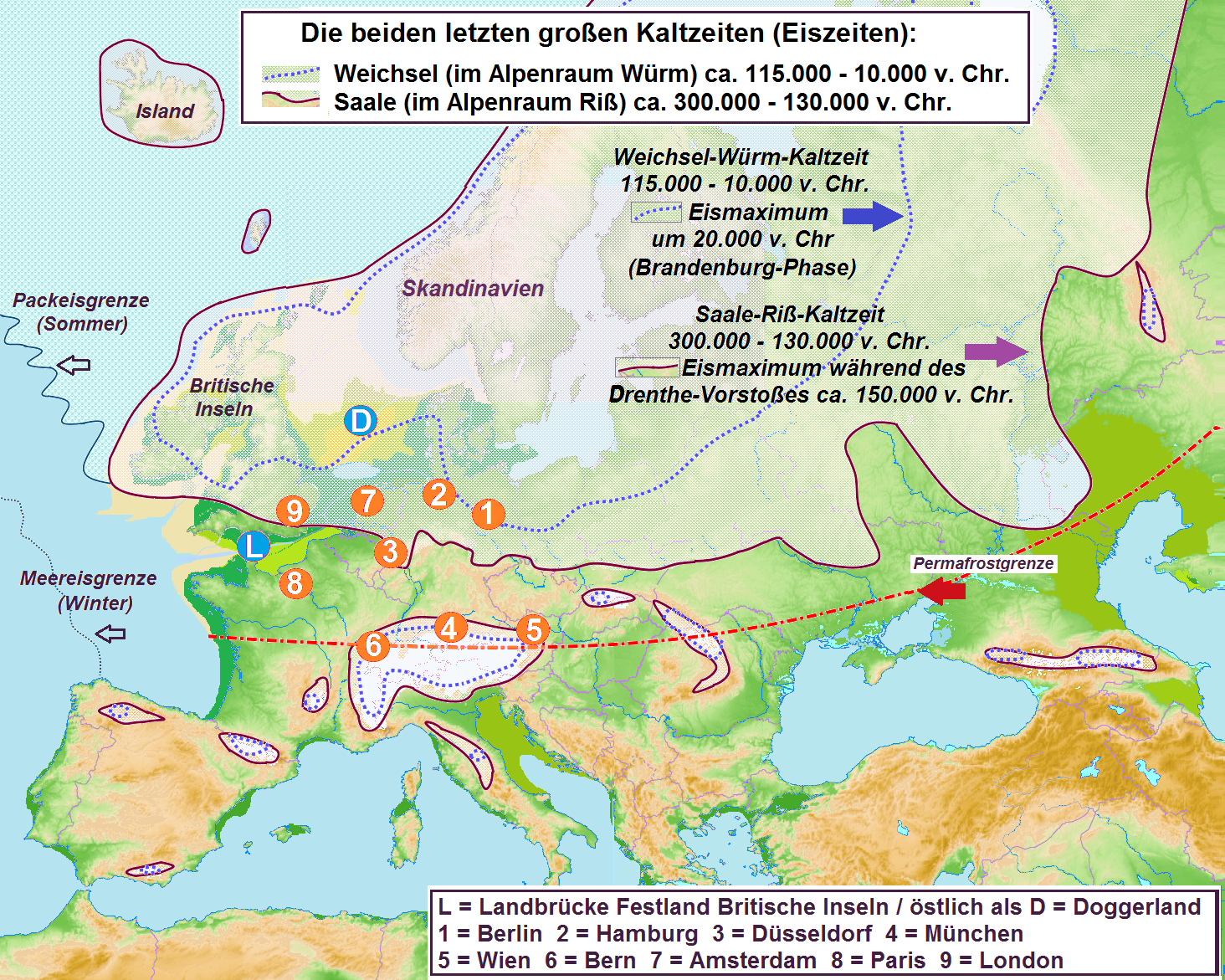
The Würm glaciation (known in north Germany as the Weichselian) in comparison with the Riss (in north Germany as the Saale). Glacial advances were interrupted by warmer interstadials. In these some ancient European co-ancestors (the Neanderthals, as successors of homo heidelbergensis) spread out from mountain zones over the intermittent permafrost to the north and northeast. Then from about 40,000 BC European early modern humans more greatly settled these regions.

== Sequence and subdivisions ==
The Saale complex may be divided into a lower (also Saale Early Glacial) and an upper section (also Middle and Upper Saale Glacial, or Younger Saale glaciation), with glacial advances into Northern Germany.

The Saale Early Glacial includes the:

- Dömnitz interglacial, which was characterised by oak mixed forest, hazel and hornbeam. Worth mentioning is the discovery of Water Fern (Azolla filiculoides).
- Fuhne glacial. After the end of the Holstein interglacial, the forests of North Germany died and a sub-arctic vegetation formed.

The upper part of the Saale complex (obere Teil des Saale-Komplexes) is characterised in North Germany by three great glacial advances (possibly even four in Schleswig-Holstein). They are usually called the:

- Warthe Stage or Stadium (Warthe-Stadium)
- Drenthe Stage or Stadium (Drenthe-Stadium)
  - Drenthe II Phase (Jüngere Drenthe)
  - Drenthe I Phase (Haupt-Drenthe)

There are no indisputable traces in northern Germany of clear thermomers (interstadials, intervals) between these advances. In the work by Litt et al. (2007) focussed on the southern perimeter of the North German glaciations, the upper part of the Saale complex is subdivided as follows:

- Warthe Stage (Warthe-Stadium)
- Seyda Interval (Seyda-Intervall)
- Drenthe Stage (Drenthe-Stadium)
  - Leipzig Phase (Leipzig-Phase)
  - Pomßen Interval (Pomßen-Intervall)
  - Zeitz Phase (Zeitz-Phase)
- (Delitzsch Phase (Delitzsch-Phase) (Note: The Delitzsch Phase is not counted as part of the Drenthe Stage, but precedes it, s. Litt et al. 2007, p. 38))

The Drenthe Stage corresponds to the maximum extent of glaciation during the Saale complex. During the last stage, the Warthe Stage, glaciers only covered northeast Lower Saxony (parts of the Lüneburg Heath), the Altmark, the Elbe valley downstream of Magdeburg and the region east of it (cf. Südlicher Landrücken), so that these areas are geomorphologically younger than the Northwest German Plain, but older and exhibiting more surface weathering than the much later Young Drift areas of the Weichselian glaciation in northeast Germany. The areas last covered by the Saale cold period, roughly the Westphalian Bight, a large part of Lower Saxony and Saxony-Anhalt, south Brandenburg, or the Leipzig Bay and Lusatia in Saxony, are called the Old Drift Landscapes (Altmoränenlandschaften). They were further shaped and changed during the later Weichselian cold period by periglacial processes such as wind-borne sand and loess. The major urstromtal associated with the Saale glacial stage is the Breslau-Magdeburg-Bremen Urstromtal, which was not subsequently covered by ice.

== See also ==
- Pleistocene, which covers:

Historical names of the "four major" glacials in four regions.
Region	Glacial 1	Glacial 2	Glacial 3	Glacial 4
Alps	Günz	Mindel	Riss	Würm
North Europe	Eburonian	Elsterian	Saalian	Weichselian
British Isles	Beestonian	Anglian	Wolstonian	Devensian
Midwest U.S.	Nebraskan	Kansan	Illinoian	Wisconsinan

Historical names of interglacials.
Region	Interglacial 1	Interglacial 2	Interglacial 3
Alps	Günz-Mindel	Mindel-Riss	Riss-Würm
North Europe	Waalian	Holsteinian	Eemian
British Isles	Cromerian	Hoxnian	Ipswichian
Midwest U.S.	Aftonian	Yarmouthian	Sangamonian

== Literature ==
- Thomas Litt, Karl-Ernst Behre, Klaus-Dieter Meyer, Hans-Jürgen Stephan und Stefan Wansa: Stratigraphische Begriffe für das Quartär des norddeutschen Vereisungsgebietes. Eiszeitalter und Gegenwart (Quaternary Science Journal), 56(1/2): 7–65, Hanover, 2007. ISSN 0424-7116 doi:10.3285/eg.56.1-2.02
- Leopold Benda (ed.): Das Quartär Deutschlands. 408 pp., Borntraeger, Berlin, Stuttgart, 1995 ISBN 3-443-01031-8
