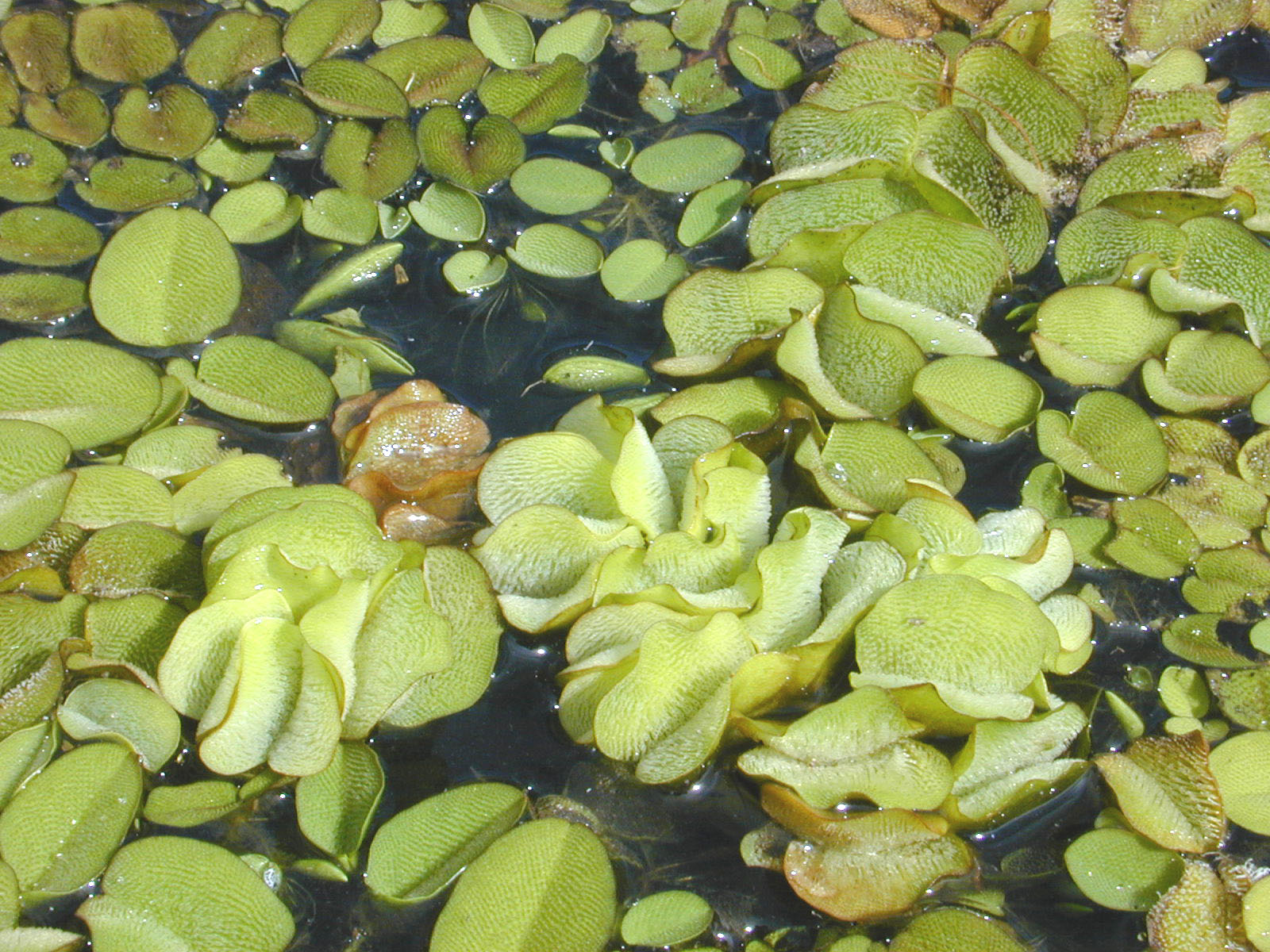
- The fern Salvinia molesta floating on a pond surface

Scientific classification
- Kingdom: Plantae
- Clade: Tracheophytes
- Division: Polypodiophyta
- Class: Polypodiopsida
- Order: Salviniales
- Family: Salviniaceae
- Genus: Salvinia
- Species: S. molesta

Binomial name
- Salvinia molesta D.Mitch.

= Salvinia molesta =

Giant salvinia

Species of aquatic plant

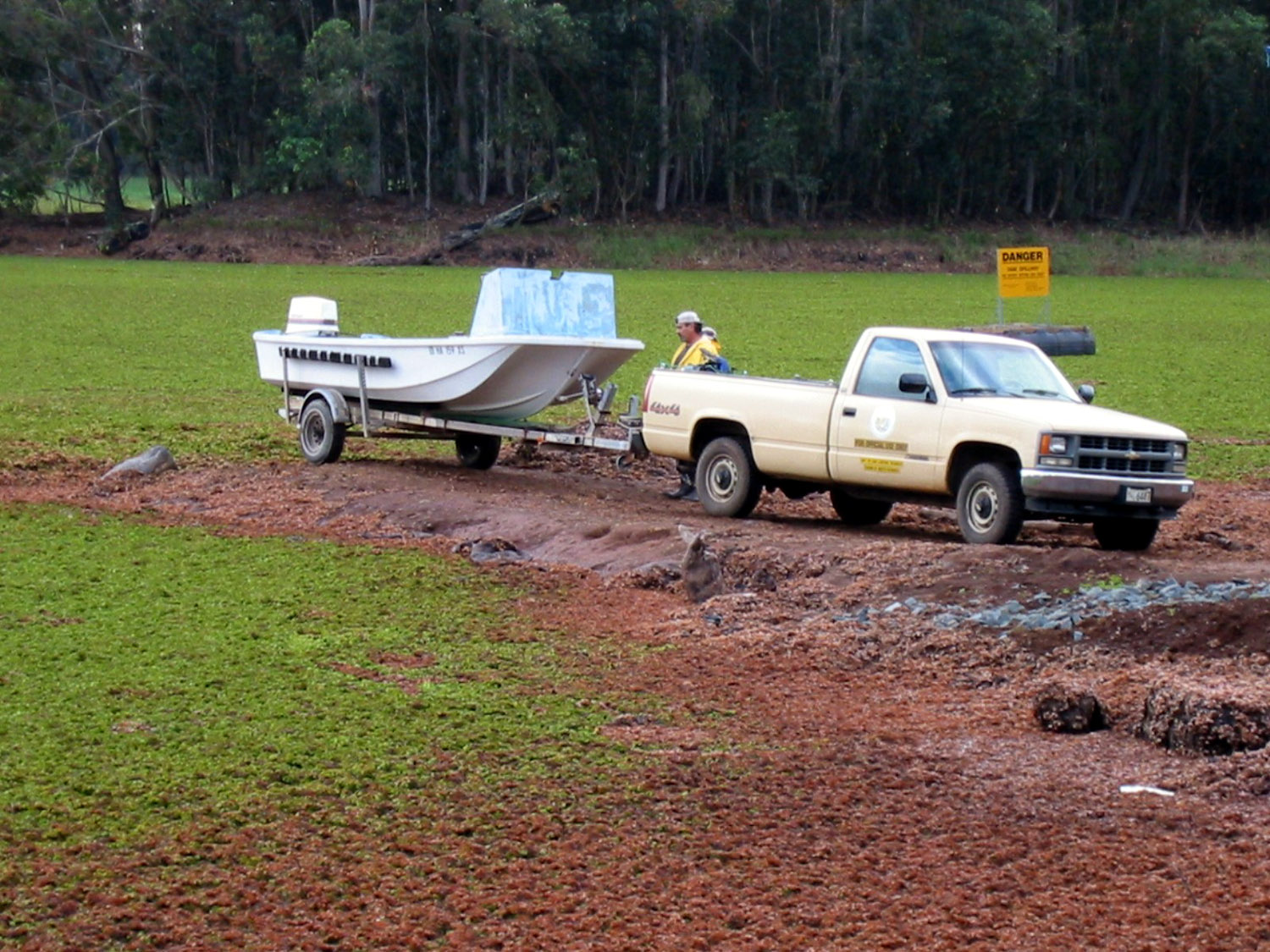
Giant salvinia completely cover Lake Wilson in Hawaii.

Salvinia molesta, commonly known as giant salvinia, is a free-floating aquatic fern native to southeastern Brazil. It is invasive in many parts of the world, especially southern Africa, where it is commonly known as Kariba weed due to its infestation of Lake Kariba, a large artificial lake situated between Zambia and Zimbabwe. The fern is notable for its long and broad fronds and bristly, waterproof surfaces. The fronds are produced in pairs, with a third modified root-like frond that hangs in the water.

S. molesta has been accidentally introduced to several lakes throughout the world. Since 2019, it has been included in the European Union's list of invasive alien species of Union concern. The species cannot be legally imported, cultivated, transported, commercialized, planted, or intentionally released into the environment in the European Union. In the United States, it has been introduced into Caddo Lake in Texas, where it has caused significant eutrophication.

Salvinia molesta is a polyploid of hybrid origin and recent phylogenetic work has pointed towards a South American origin of the species from two unknown or extinct "ghost" progenitor taxa.

== Description ==
S. molesta belongs to a complex of closely-related water fern species that are only visually distinguishable by their unique sporocarps. The fern was originally grown as an ornamental plant, but has since escaped its native habitat and become a pest in many regions worldwide. S. molesta exhibits multiple growth forms; its primary invasive form has small, flat leaves, while its tertiary form has larger leaves that are crowded and folded. Under favorable conditions, the plants can form a dense mat up to two feet in thickness; such mats are often large enough to interfere with recreational activities on lakes and waterways. S. molesta extracts nutrients and pollutants from the water. When it is dried out, it can be used as mulch.

Several organic and chemical compounds have been isolated from S. molesta, including 6'-O-(3,4-dihydroxy benzoyl)-beta-D-glucopyranosyl ester, 4-O-beta-d-glucopyranoside-3-hydroxy methyl benzoate, methyl benzoate, hypogallic acid, caffeic acid, paeoniflorin, and pikuroside.

== Growing conditions ==
S. molesta reproduces by asexual reproduction. It is capable of growing extremely quickly, starting from small fragments and doubling in dry weight every 2.2–2.5 days. The fern can grow from fragments or dormant buds that have been detached from the main plant. Each node can produce up to five buds, allowing the plant to spread rapidly under favorable conditions. The plant also generates genetically defective spores that do not produce viable offspring.

S. molesta prefers to grow in areas of slow-moving water, such as those found in lakes, ponds, oxbow lakes, streams, ditches, marshes, and rivers. It prefers nutrient-rich waters, and thrives in bodies of water that are eutrophic or polluted by wastewater. The fern usually does not grow in brackish or salty water, but its presence has been reported in streams with a tidal flow in southeast Texas. It can tolerate dewatering, as well as exposure to low or very high temperatures, although it prefers to grow in moderate temperatures. The United States Geological Service has highlighted zones 7a, 8, 9, and 10 of the USDA Plant Hardiness Map as possible regions of growth for the fern.

The survivability of individual S. molesta specimens is heavily dependent on environmental conditions. It can survive on a mud bank for a short period of time, but will eventually wither and die due to the dry conditions. The fern grows best at a pH of 6–7.7, and at a water temperature of 20–30 degrees Celsius (68–86 °F). S. molesta has been observed to grow quickly when exposed to high-intensity light sources. However, the plant cannot grow in water with high salt concentrations, as the increased salt levels cause a decrease in chlorophyll production.

== Distribution ==
S. molesta is native to Brazil, but is now widely distributed in global tropical and subtropical climate zones. It is known for taking over large bodies of slow-moving fresh water. S. molesta has been naturalized in Texas and Louisiana, and has also been observed and reported in Alabama, Mississippi, Florida, and Georgia. It can also be found where the lower Colorado River borders Arizona and California. The regions of Texas where S. molesta is naturalized contain a total of 14 drainage basins with infested water bodies; these basins are used as impoundments on tributaries that flow near federally protected wetlands. In October 2020, the Texas Parks and Wildlife Department detected specimens of S. molesta in the Lone Star Lake within the city of Marshall while surveying fish populations.

=== Invasion ===
S. molesta originated in southeast Brazil, and was exported from its native habitat to be used as an ornamental plant in aquariums and garden ponds. From these environments, it escaped or was deliberately released into the wild. Specimens of the fern may also have been exported along with fresh and iced fish. Once in a waterway, it can be transported to adjacent bodies of water by boats, which not only spread it to new areas, but also break up the plant, allowing it to propagate quickly. S. molesta has been spread by contaminated aquatic plant stocks, boats, and other watercraft. S. molesta is also spread by the movement of water in rivers and by the sale and exchange of individual specimens, which increases the chances of accidental environmental release.

The rapid growth rate of S. molesta has resulted in its classification as an invasive weed in Australia, the United Kingdom, New Zealand, and parts of the United States. Surfaces of infested ponds, reservoirs, and lakes are covered by a floating mat 10–20 centimetres (3.9–7.9 in) thick; in some rare cases, these mats can reach up to 60 centimetres (24 in) in thickness. The plant's explosive growth clogs waterways and blocks the sunlight needed by other aquatic plants, especially algae, to carry out photosynthesis. This results in rapid deoxygenation of affected water bodies. As it dies and decays, the process of decomposition further uses up the oxygen in the water. It also prevents the natural exchange of gases that occurs between the air and the surface of the water, causing the waterway to stagnate. This can kill any plants, insects, or fish trapped underneath its growth.

S. molesta's ability to quickly cover a vast area makes it a significant threat to biodiversity. Large infestations may pose a problem to migratory birds, as they may not be able to recognize and stop at infested waterways when flying overhead. S. molesta provides ideal conditions for the breeding of mosquitoes that carry disease. The growth habit of the fern is also problematic to human activities including flood mitigation, conservation of endangered species, boating, and irrigation.

== Relation to humans ==
=== Salvinia effect ===
The salvinia effect describes the stabilization of a thin layer of air upon a submerged hydrophobic surface. This physical phenomenon was discovered on the floating fern S. molesta by botanist Wilhelm Barthlott of the Universität Bonn while working on the lotus effect, and was described in cooperation with physicist Thomas Schimmel of the Karlsruhe Institute of Technology, fluid mechanist Alfred Leder of the University of Rostock, and their colleagues in 2010.

=== Bioremediation ===
Research done in the Philippines points to the effectiveness of S. molesta as a treatment treatment of blackwater effluent for an eco-friendly sewage system, using a constructed wetland to treat wastewater. The study demonstrated that S. molesta was able to remove 30.77% of total suspended solids, 74.70% of dissolved oxygen, and 48.95% of fecal coliform from an infested water body.

=== Cancer research ===
In 2011, researchers at Stephen F. Austin State University in Nacogdoches, Texas, demonstrated that extracts of giant salvinia show promising signs of inhibiting growth of human cancer cells, without destroying nearby healthy ones.

=== Control ===
Satellite imagery has been used to identify S. molesta outbreaks in water reservoirs across Texas.

==== Biological control ====
The weevil species Cyrtobagous salviniae, native to South America and found in the distribution of S. molesta, has been studied as a possible biocontrol agent. C. salvinae was first used as a biological control in Australia at Lake Moondarra, a recreational lake in Mount Isa, Queensland in 1980. By mid-1981, the weevil had reduced the fern population within the lake to a few small patches. The weevil consumes the leaves and buds of the weed, while the larvae eats the roots, rhizomes, and the buds. As the plant died, it turned brown, sank to the bottom of the waterway and decomposed. The weevil has been successfully used to curb S. molesta outbreaks in other parts of the world, such as the Sepik River in Papua, Sri Lanka, Lake Ossa in Cameroon, Wappa Dam in Queensland, and lagoons in Kakadu National Park), Australia. In Australia, the moth Samea multiplicalis was also released in hopes that it would reduce the size of the weed population. While this moth did become established in Australia, it was not effective as a biological control. A third species, the grasshopper Paulinia acuminata, was considered, but not released in Australia. However, this grasshopper has been deliberately released in order to control S. molesta in parts of Africa, Sri Lanka and India, and was accidentally released in Puerto Rico. The giant gourami has also been known to consume S. molesta in large quantities, and has been successfully used to control the fern's population in reservoirs across Sri Lanka.

==== Mechanical control ====
In mechanical control methods, outbreaks of S. molesta are removed by machine, with harvesting equipment, or by hand; the latter is suitable only for small infestations. Harvesting equipment can encounter difficulties as it cannot remove all of the infestation, cannot access shallow areas, and can be inhibited by large masses of the plant. Once removed, the plant must be dried, burnt, or disposed of in a manner that ensures it will not re-enter the waterway. Other methods of controlling the spread of the aquatic weed include dredging and chaining.

==== Chemical control ====
Attempts to chemically control S. molesta have had mixed success, as the plant exhibits a significant resistance to herbicides. The aquatic herbicide fluridone has been successfully used to curb the plant's spread, but it requires prolonged contact and is not effective if it is diluted by rainwater or any other influx of water. Other chemicals, such as hexazinone, diquat, and double-chelated copper have been used in various combinations to kill S. molesta.

==== Prevention ====
Bans on the sale and transportation of S. molesta plants may help prevent further spread of the fern into unaffected waterways.

== Gallery ==
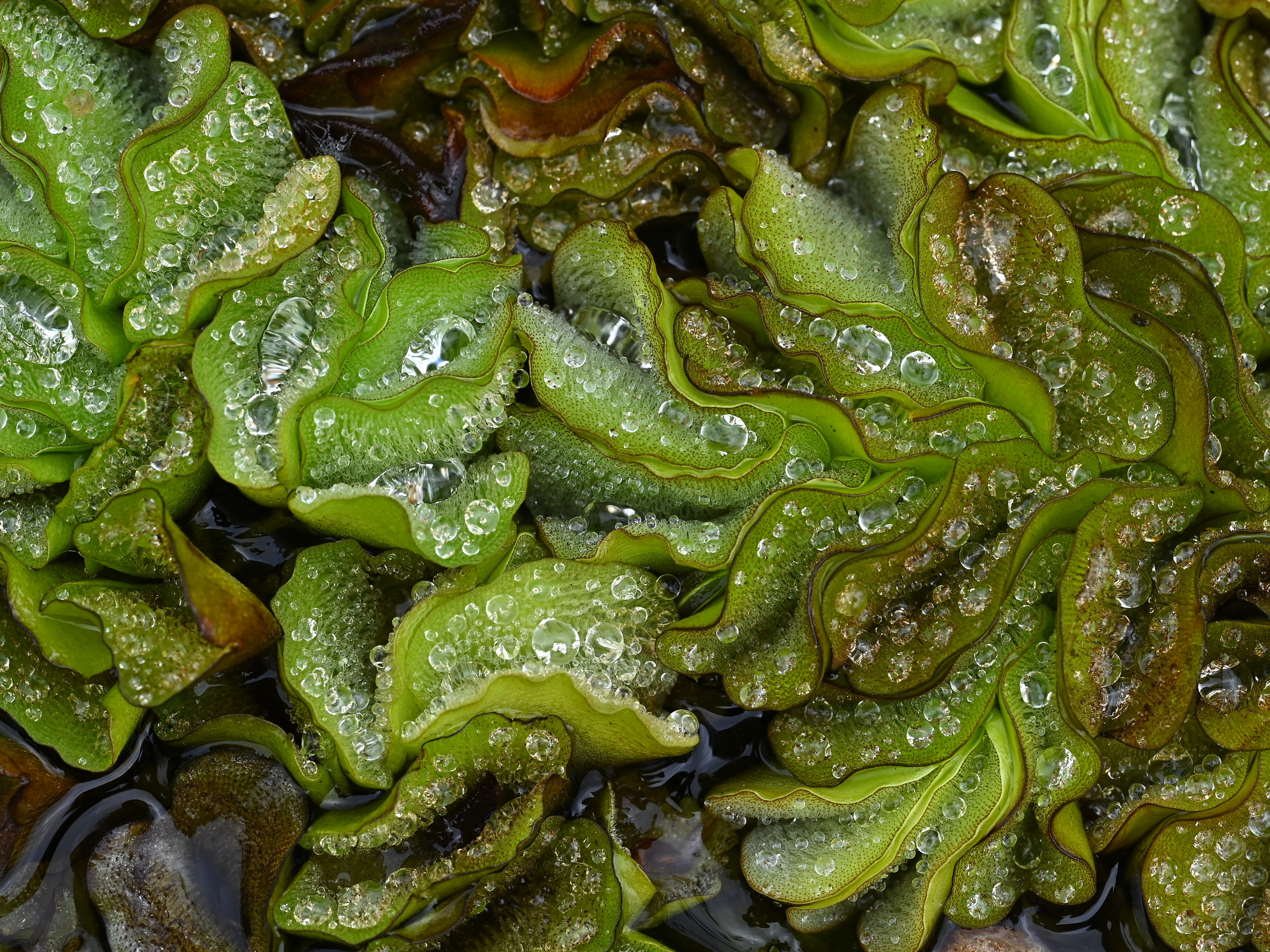
The leaves

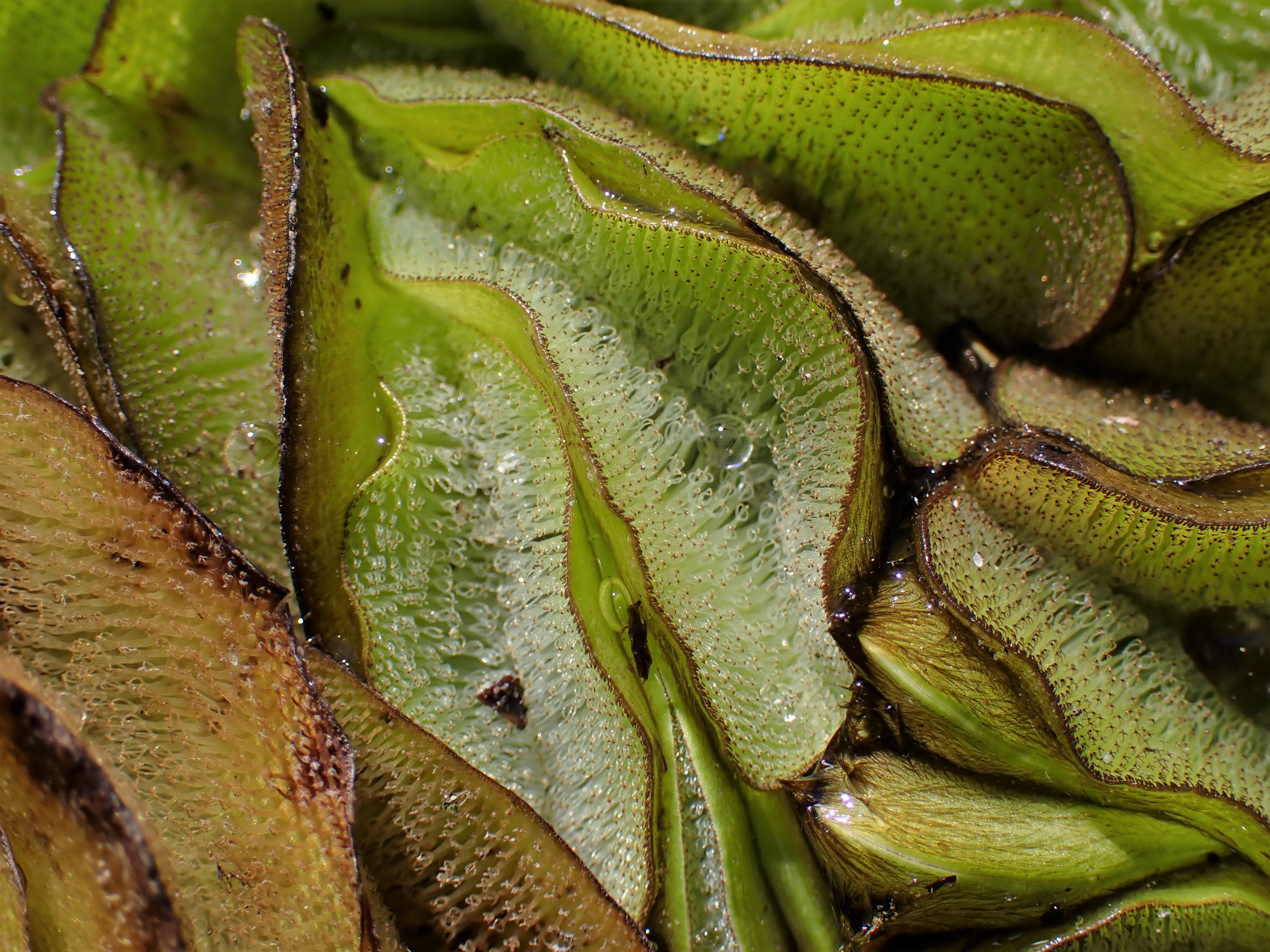
Detail of the hairs on the leaves

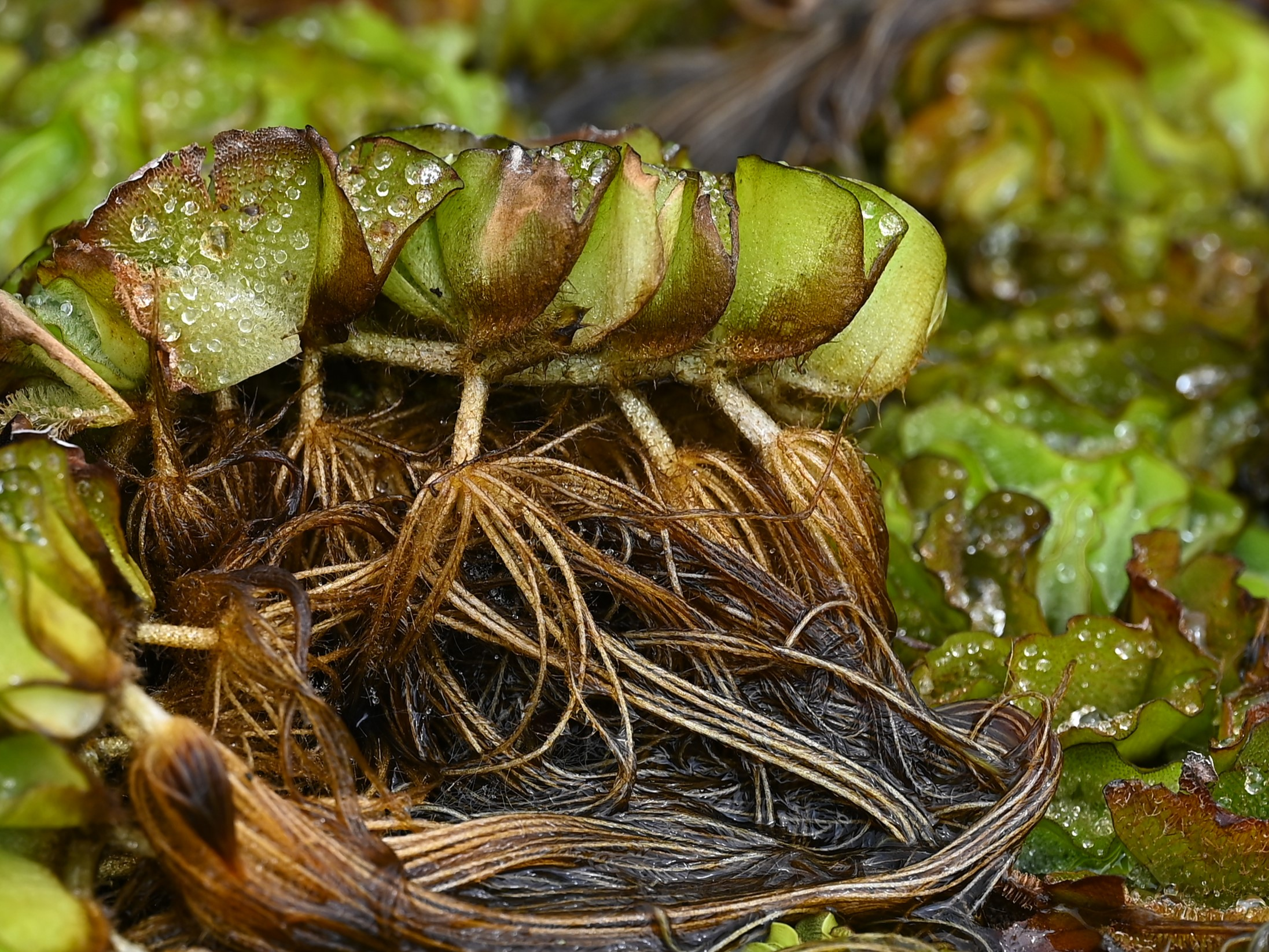
The roots

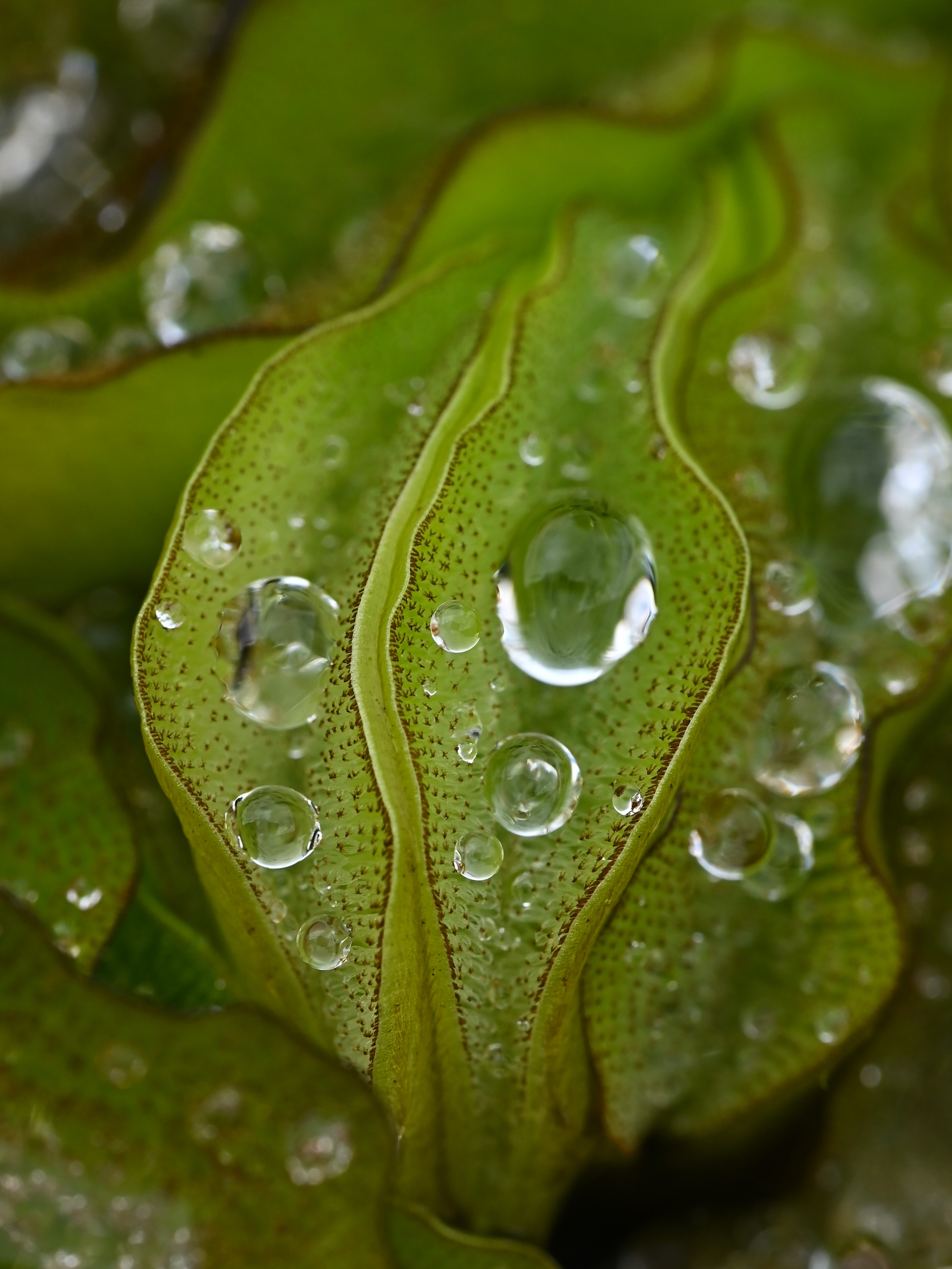
Water beads up on the leaf surface

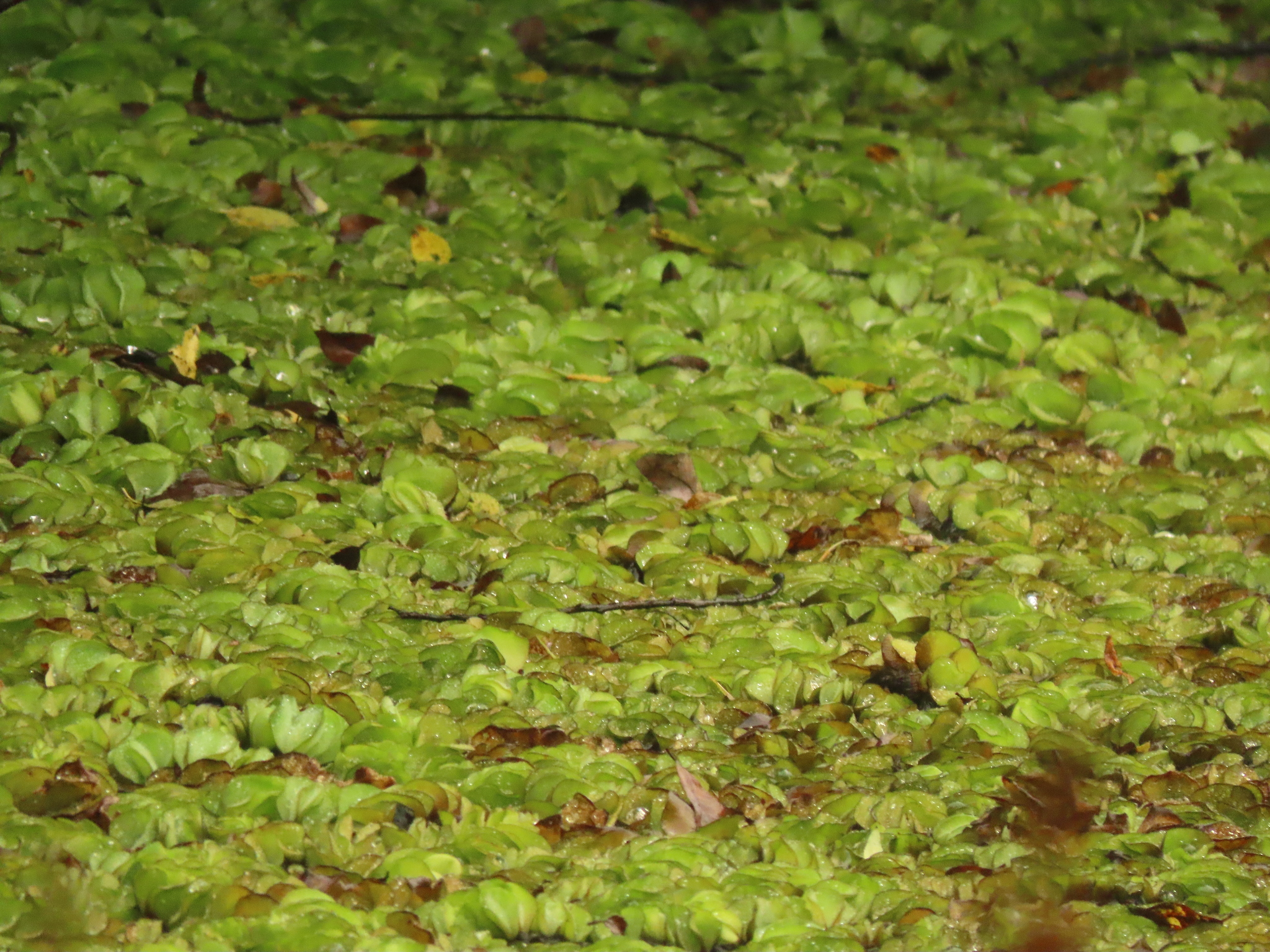
S. molesta often spreads over the full water surface

== Bibliography ==
- Everitt, J.H.; Lonard, R.L.; Little, C.R. (2007). Weeds in South Texas and Northern Mexico. Lubbock: Texas Tech University Press. ISBN 0-89672-614-2
