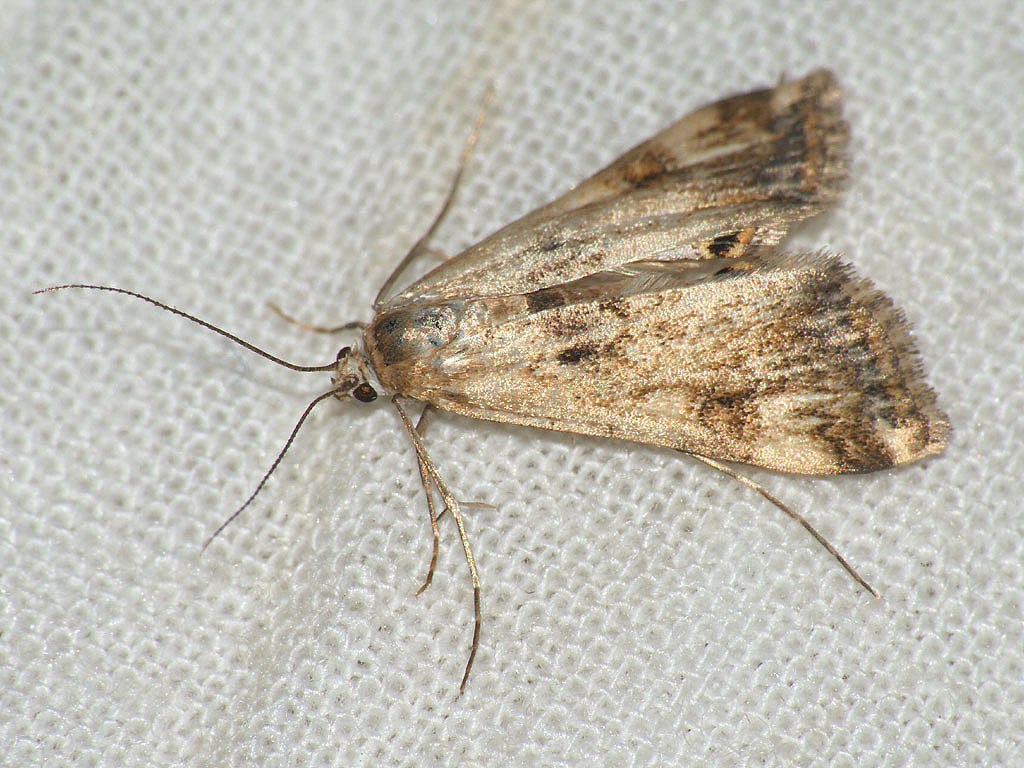

Scientific classification
- Kingdom: Animalia
- Phylum: Arthropoda
- Class: Insecta
- Order: Lepidoptera
- Family: Crambidae
- Genus: Cataclysta
- Species: C. lemnata

Binomial name
- Cataclysta lemnata (Linnaeus, 1758)

Synonyms
- Cataclysta lemnae G. W. Müller, 1892; Cataclysta lemnata ab. ochracea Hauder, 1910; Cataclysta lemnata brunneospersa Osthelder, 1935; Cataclysta lemnata confirmata Krulikovsky, 1909; Cataclysta confirmata Krulikovsky, 1907; Cataclysta limnalis Berce, 1878; Phalaena limnata Fabricius, 1787; Phalaena gemmata Hufnagel, 1767; Phalaena Tinea bordella Goeze, 1783; Phalaena Tortrix albana O. F. Müller, 1764; Phalaena uliginata Fabricius, 1794; Pyralis lemnalis Denis & Schiffermüller, 1775; Tinea marginatella Fourcroy, 1785

= Cataclysta lemnata =

Small china-mark

Species of moth

Cataclysta lemnata, the small china-mark, is a moth species of the family Crambidae. It is found in Europe (including Great Britain and Ireland), Morocco and Iran.

Adults of the species are sexually dimorphic. The wingspan is 18–19 mm for males and 22–24 mm for females. The forewings are white. The costa, discal spot and a series of terminal spots are all fuscous. The hindwings are white with scattered pale fuscous scales. Meyrick describes it- The forewings in male are whitish, with a yellowish-fuscous discal dot, traces of lines, and a pale brownish terminal streak; in female pale brownish, ochreous-mixed, with a darker discal spot, lines very indistinct, whitish, darker-edged, a whitish siibterminal streak. Hindwings are white; a dark fuscous discal dot; lines outlined with fuscous, sometimes nearly obsolete, first preceded by a yellow or fuscous spot in disc; subterminal and terminal ochreous lines enclosing a black fascia marked with four bluish-silvery dots. The larva is dark green or blackish; dorsal line black; head pale brown. See also Parsons et al.

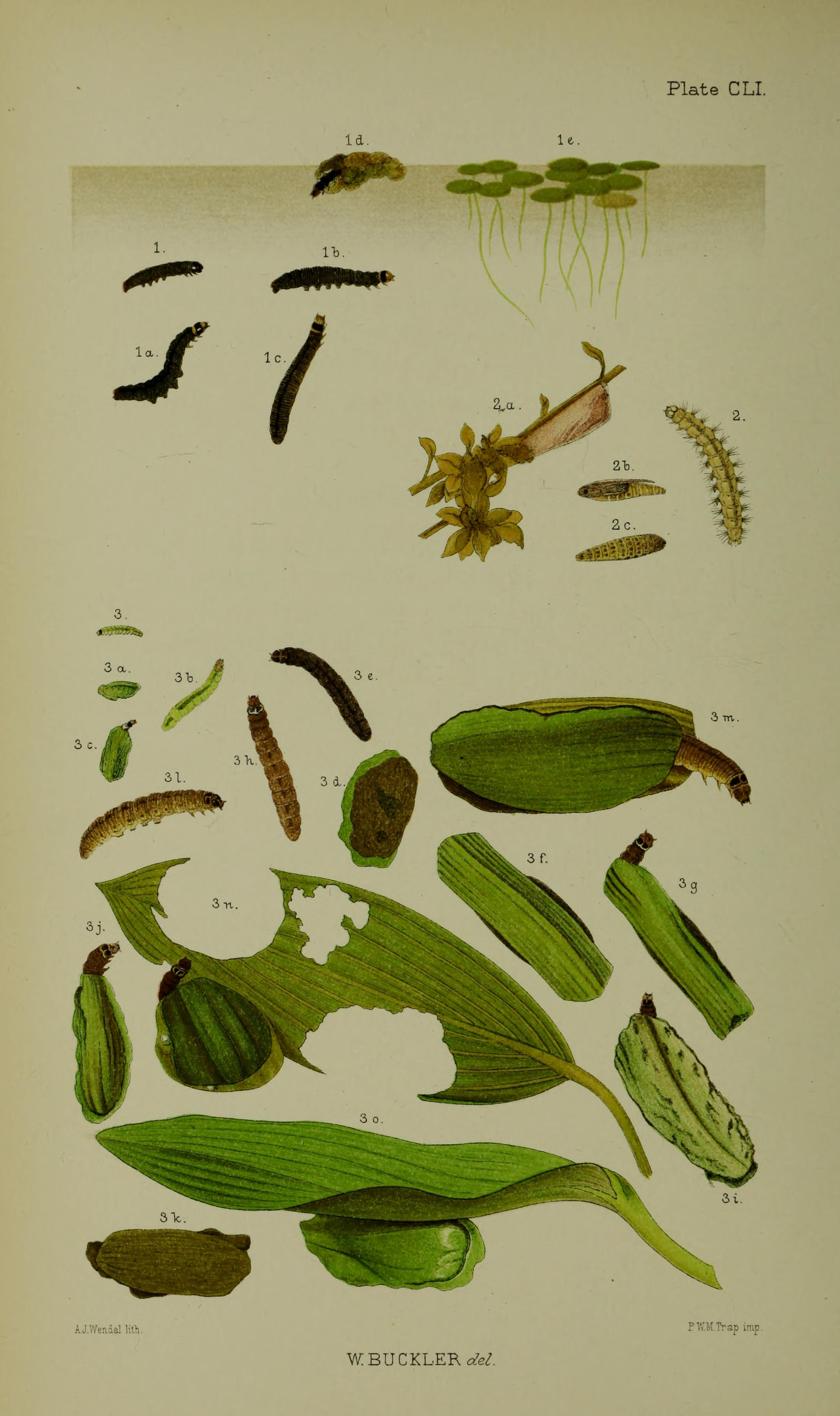
Figs 1, 1a, 1b. 1c larvae in various stages of growth 1d larva in natural state in its case, among duckweed (1e)

The moth flies from May to August depending on the location.

Larvae are semiaquatic. C. lemnata larvae have been recorded feeding on duckweed species (including Lemna species and Spirodela polyrhiza), as well as water ferns of the genus Azolla. The species is known to pupate in cocoons or shelters built from plant material.
