= Batrachedra litterata =

Scientific classification
- Kingdom: Animalia
- Phylum: Arthropoda
- Clade: Pancrustacea
- Class: Insecta
- Order: Lepidoptera
- Family: Batrachedridae
- Genus: Batrachedra
- Species: B. litterata

Binomial name
- Batrachedra litterata Philpott, 1928

Moth species in family Batrachedridae

Batrachedra litterata is a species of moth in the family Batrachedridae. It is endemic to New Zealand and has been collected in the North and South Islands. This species has been reared on the fern species Blechnum chambersii. Adults are on the wing in November and December.

== Taxonomy ==
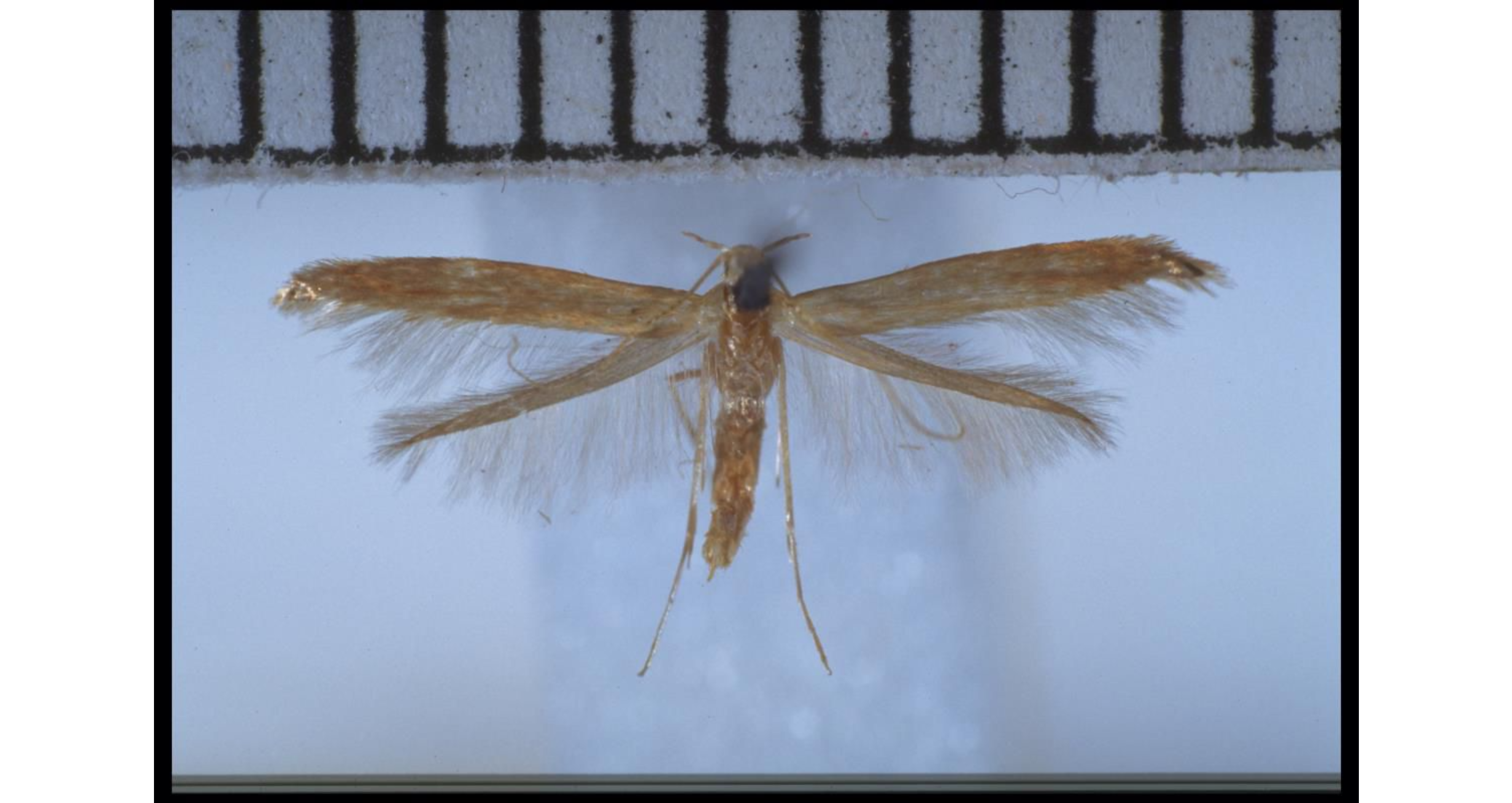
Female holotype specimen of Batrachedra litterata

This species was first described in 1928 by Alfred Philpott from specimens collected by Dr A. J. Turner in Greymouth in February. George Hudson discussed and illustrated this species both in his 1939 book A supplement to the butterflies and moths of New Zealand. The holotype specimen is held at the New Zealand Arthropod Collection.

== Description ==
Philpott described this species as follows:

♀. 10–11 mm. Head and thorax whitish-ochreous. Palpi whitish-ochreous, marked with brown outwardly. Antennae ochreous annulated with brown. Legs whitish-ochreous, anterior pair infuscated, tarsi faintly annulated with paler. Forewings whitish-ochreous, darker apically, round apex black: fringes greyish-fuscous, round apex ochreous. Hindwings greyish-fuscous.

== Distribution ==
This species is endemic to New Zealand. Along with its type locality of Greymouth, this species has also been collected in Claverley, in Canterbury as well as in the Waitākere Ranges.

== Behaviour ==
The adults of this species are on the wing in November and December.

== Host ==
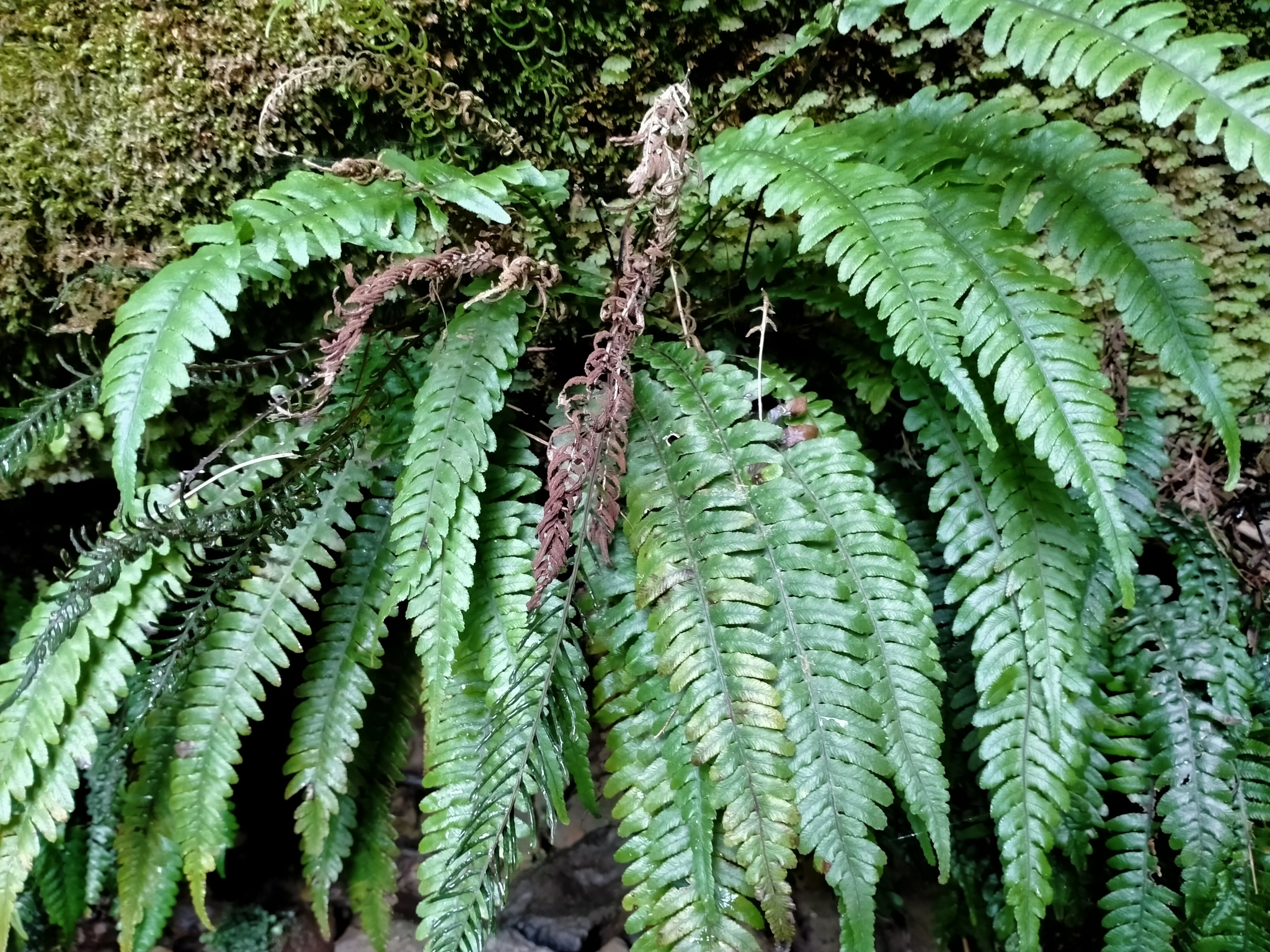
B. chambersii, host species of B. litterata.

B. litterata have been reared on the fern species Blechnum chambersii.
