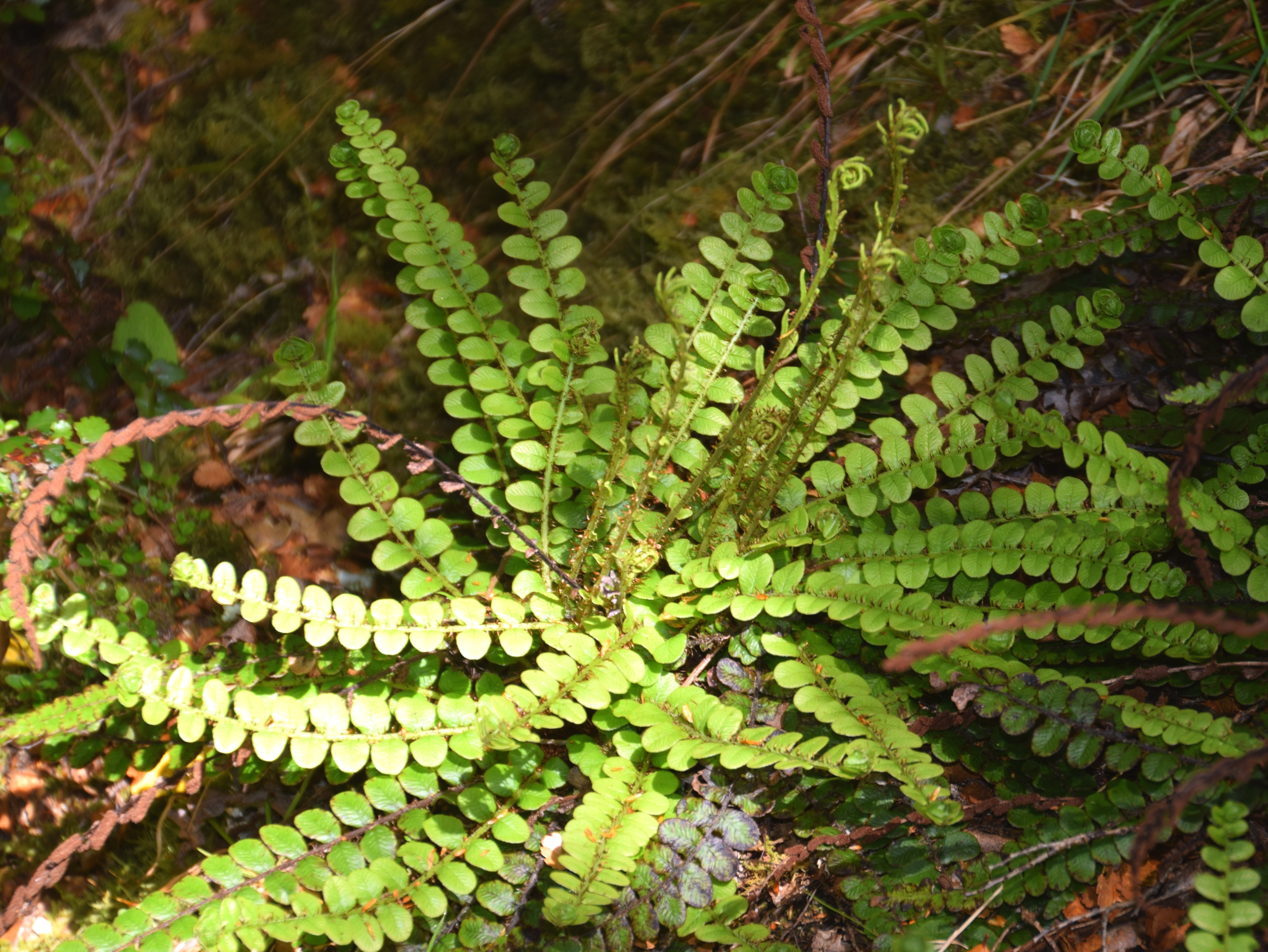
- Austroblechnum penna-marina in New Zealand

Scientific classification
- Kingdom: Plantae
- Clade: Tracheophytes
- Division: Polypodiophyta
- Class: Polypodiopsida
- Order: Polypodiales
- Suborder: Aspleniineae
- Family: Blechnaceae
- Subfamily: Blechnoideae
- Genus: Austroblechnum; Gasper & V.A.O.Dittrich

Species
- See text.

= Austroblechnum =

Genus of ferns

Austroblechnum is a genus of ferns in the family Blechnaceae, subfamily Blechnoideae, according to the Pteridophyte Phylogeny Group classification of 2016 (PPG I). The genus is accepted in a 2016 classification of the family Blechnaceae, but other sources sink it into a very broadly defined Blechnum, equivalent to the whole of the PPG I subfamily.

== Species ==
As of July 2025, using the PPG I classification system, the Checklist of Ferns and Lycophytes of the World accepted the following thirty-four species and two hybrids:

- Austroblechnum aequatoriense (A.Rojas) Gasper & V.A.O.Dittrich
- Austroblechnum andinum (Baker) Gasper & V.A.O.Dittrich
- Austroblechnum ascendens (A.Rojas) Gasper & V.A.O.Dittrich
- Austroblechnum asperum (Klotzsch) Gasper & V.A.O.Dittrich
- Austroblechnum banksii (Hook.f.) Gasper & V.A.O.Dittrich
- Austroblechnum bullatum J.Murillo & L.A.Triana
- Austroblechnum colensoi (Hook.f.) Gasper & V.A.O.Dittrich
- Austroblechnum corralense (Espinosa) Gasper & V.A.O.Dittrich
- Austroblechnum difforme (Copel.) Gasper & V.A.O.Dittrich
- Austroblechnum divergens (Kunze) Gasper & V.A.O.Dittrich
- Austroblechnum durum (T.Moore) Gasper & V.A.O.Dittrich
- Austroblechnum fernandezianum (Looser) Gasper & V.A.O.Dittrich
- Austroblechnum integrifrons (Bonap. ex Rakotondr.) Gasper & V.A.O.Dittrich
- Austroblechnum jamaicense (Broadh.) Gasper & V.A.O.Dittrich
- Austroblechnum keysseri (Rosenst.) Gasper & V.A.O.Dittrich
- Austroblechnum lanceolatum (R.Br.) Gasper & V.A.O.Dittrich
- Austroblechnum lechleri (T.Moore) Gasper & V.A.O.Dittrich
- Austroblechnum lehmannii (Hieron.) Gasper & V.A.O.Dittrich
- Austroblechnum lherminieri (Bory) Gasper & V.A.O.Dittrich
- Austroblechnum leyboldtianum (Phil.) Gasper & V.A.O.Dittrich
- Austroblechnum melanocaulon (Brack.) Gasper & V.A.O.Dittrich
- Austroblechnum membranaceum (Colenso ex Hook.) Gasper & V.A.O.Dittrich
- Austroblechnum microphyllum (Goldm.) Gasper & V.A.O.Dittrich
- Austroblechnum norfolkianum (Heward) Gasper & V.A.O.Dittrich
- Austroblechnum organense (Brade) Gasper & V.A.O.Dittrich
- Austroblechnum patersonii (R.Br.) Gasper & V.A.O.Dittrich
- Austroblechnum penna-marina (Poir.) Gasper & V.A.O.Dittrich
- Austroblechnum pinnatifidum (A.Rojas) Gasper & V.A.O.Dittrich
- Austroblechnum raiateense (J.W.Moore) Gasper & V.A.O.Dittrich
- Austroblechnum squamipes (Hieron.) Gasper & V.A.O.Dittrich
- Austroblechnum stoloniferum (Mett. ex E.Fourn.) Gasper & V.A.O.Dittrich
- Austroblechnum vallegrandense (M.Kessler & A.R.Sm.) Gasper & V.A.O.Dittrich
- Austroblechnum vieillardii (Mett.) Gasper & V.A.O.Dittrich
- Austroblechnum wardiae (Mickel & Beitel) Gasper & V.A.O.Dittrich

=== Hybrids ===
- Austroblechnum × aggregatum (Colenso) Gasper & V.A.O.Dittrich
- Austroblechnum × rodriguezii Aguiar, L.G.Quintan. & Amigo) Gasper & V.A.O.Dittrich
