= Austroblechnum leyboldtianum =

Scientific classification
- Kingdom: Plantae
- Clade: Tracheophytes
- Division: Polypodiophyta
- Class: Polypodiopsida
- Order: Polypodiales
- Suborder: Aspleniineae
- Family: Blechnaceae
- Genus: Austroblechnum
- Species: A. leyboldtianum

Binomial name
- Austroblechnum leyboldtianum (Phil.) Gasper & V.A.O.Dittrich

Synonyms
- Blechnum leyboldtianum (Phil.) C.Chr.; Blechnum lomarioides (Bory) Mett.; Blechnum valdiviense C.Chr.; Lomaria blechnoides Bory; Lomaria leyboldtiana Phil.; Spicanta blechnoides (Bory) Kuntze; Spicanta leyboldtiana (Phil.) Kuntze; Struthiopteris varians Broadh.

Species of fern

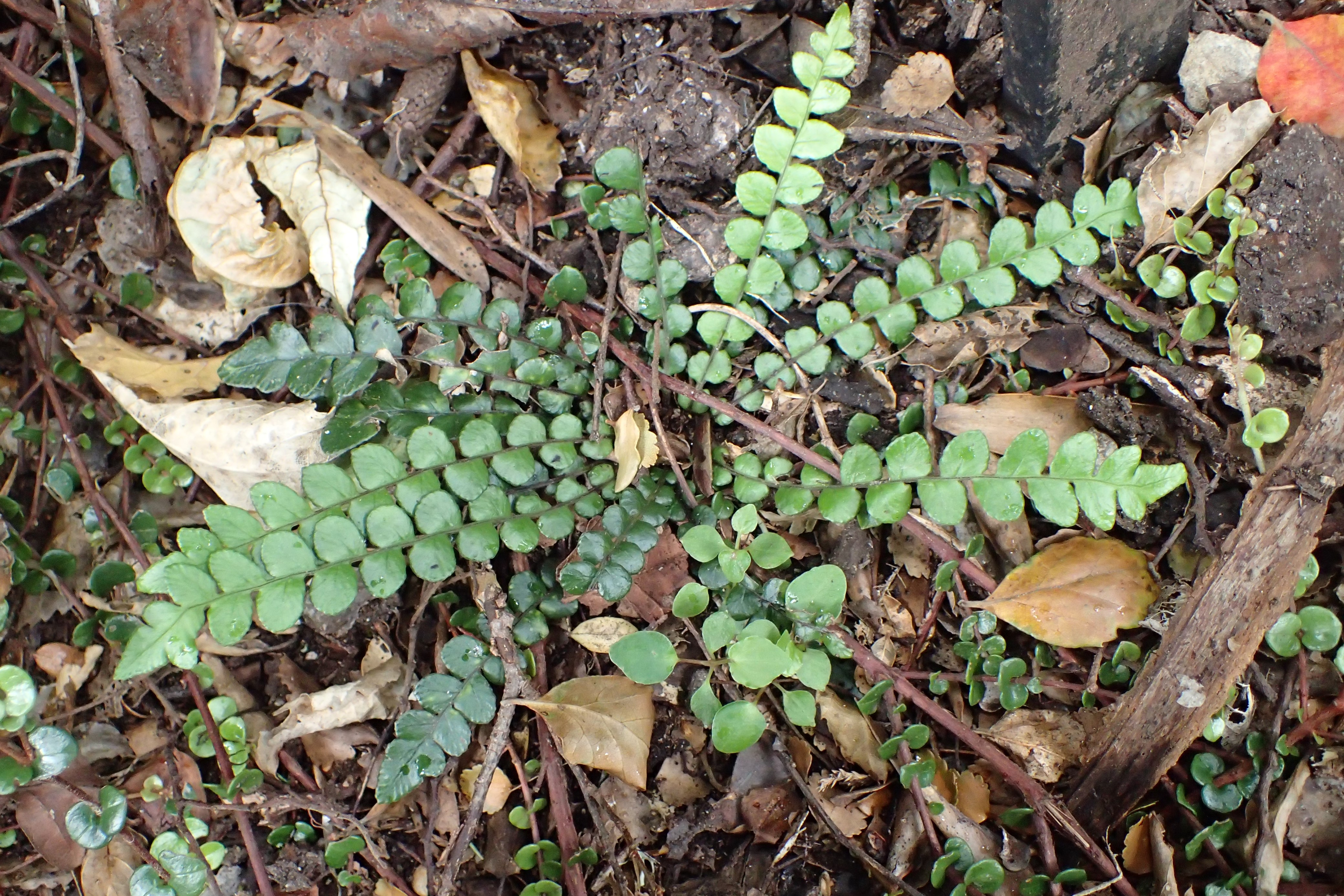
Blechnum blechnoides in Wellington Botanical Garden.

Austroblechnum leyboldtianum, synonym Blechnum blechnoides, known as iquide in Chilean Spanish, is a fern species endemic to Chile.

It has a distribution range from Concepción to Aisén in Chile. It grows up to altitudes of 1,000 metres (3,300 ft).

== See also ==
- Austroblechnum durum
