= Lake Ellery =

Lake in South Westland, New Zealand

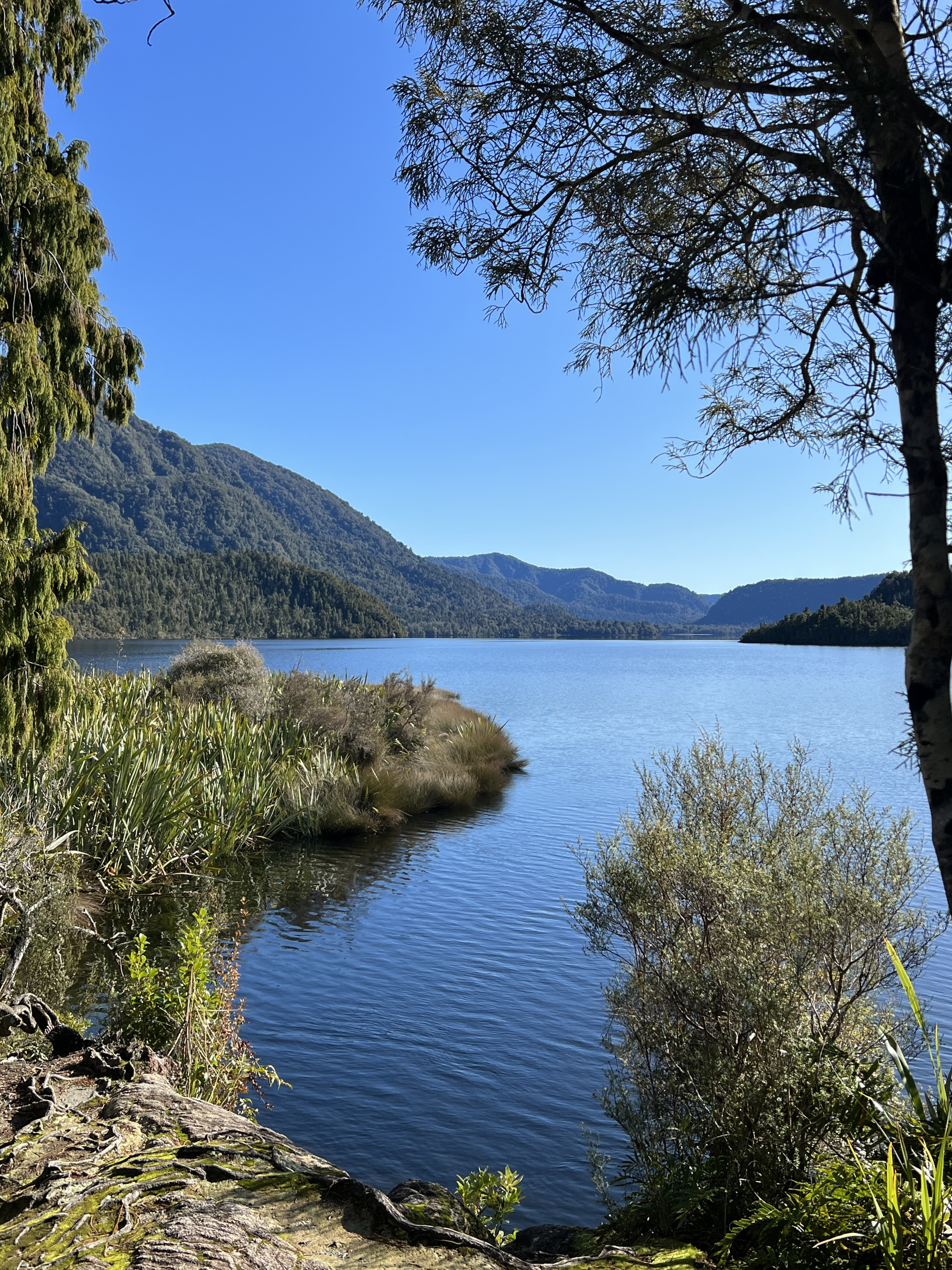

- Location of Lake Ellery in New Zealand
- Interactive map of Lake Ellery
- Location: Westland District, West Coast region, South Island
- Coordinates: 44.053°S 168.656°E
- Primary inflows: Silver Stream, Tuesday Brook, Flicker Stream, Ellery Creek, Grebe Creek, Browning Rivulet, Grayling Stream, Rumbling Torrent, and one unnamed stream
- Primary outflows: Ellery Stream
- Catchment area: 25 square kilometres (9.7 sq mi)
- Max. length: 4.6 kilometres (2.9 mi)
- Max. width: 1.1 kilometres (0.68 mi)
- Surface area: 380 hectares (940 acres)
- Max. depth: 90 metres (300 ft)
- Surface elevation: 12 metres (39 ft)

Lake Ellery is a glacially-formed lake in South Westland on the West Coast of New Zealand's South Island. It has a steep and entirely forested catchment, with a diverse flora and fauna, and is accessible only by foot or boat. Sediments laid down by its tributaries have preserved a 2,000-year record of ruptures of the nearby Alpine fault.

== Geography ==
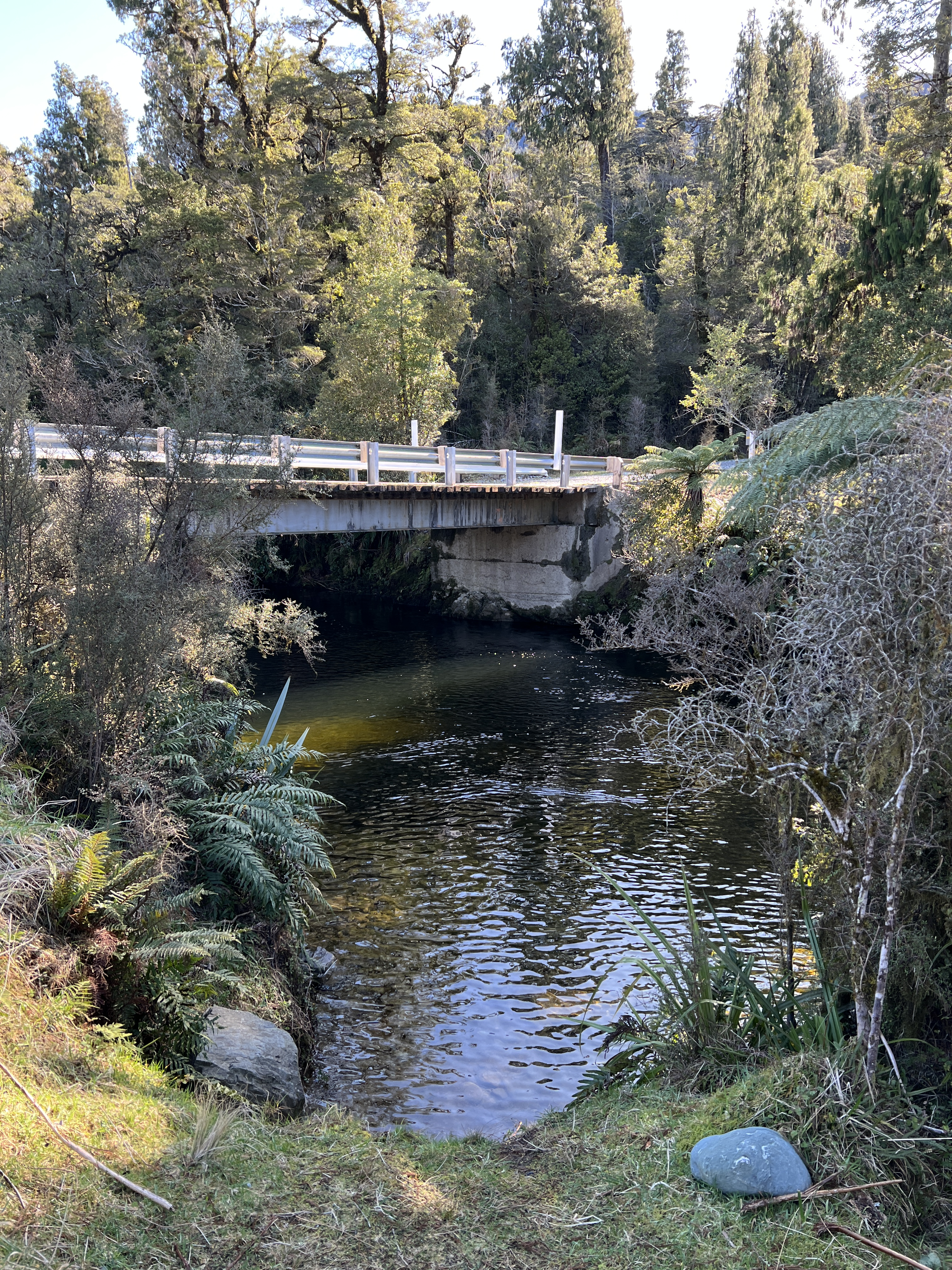
Ellery Stream at Jackson River Road bridge

Lake Ellery is 35 kilometres (22 mi) south-west of Haast and 5 km (3.1 mi) inland from Jackson Bay / Okahu. It is accessed by a narrow unsealed road 3 km from the Arawhata River bridge, but there is no road leading to the lake shore. The only land access is by the Lake Ellery Track, an easy 30-minute walking track beside Ellery Stream, the lake's only outfall. The track leads to a picnic spot beside the south-eastern shore of the lake. In 1998 maintenance of the track ceased due to lack of use, but the Department of Conservation reopened it around 2007 in response to requests by the community, and it has been recently upgraded.

Ellery Stream connects to the Jackson River, a tributary of the Arawhata River; it is possible for a powerboat to enter the lake via the 1.5 km (0.93 mi) stream, depending on water levels, but sometimes only kayaks can navigate it. The lake shore itself can only be explored by boat.

The lake is situated between the Burmeister and Stafford Ranges, and is a deep channel carved out by an arm of the former Arawhata Glacier in the last ice age. It is long and narrow—less than 1 km (0.62 mi) wide at its widest point—and has a surface area of 38 km^{2} (15 sq mi). It is surrounded by steep (up to 23°) hills rising to 900 m (3,000 ft) above the lake surface, and itself is steep-sided, with a maximum depth of 90 m (300 ft) in the middle and an extensive shelf 60 m (200 ft) deep at its north-western end. Because its steep catchment is entirely forested with no major watercourses—none of its small tributaries are longer than 3 km (1.9 mi)—the lake has escaped being filled in by large debris-carrying rivers.

Lake Ellery is only 3 km away from the Alpine Fault, and it preserves a record of major ruptures of this fault in the layers of sediment deposited by its tributaries. Earthquakes produce underwater resettlement of sediment, followed by an influx of sediment from landslides in the surrounding hills, which can be observed in sediment cores from the lake shore. This record goes back over 2,000 years, and complements similar records of Alpine fault earthquakes laid down at Lake Paringa and Lake Mapourika to the north; these record not only the date of major earthquakes but which section of the fault ruptured. The sediment cores from Lake Ellery record major ruptures of the South Westland section of the Alpine fault around the years A.D. 845–775 and 739–646, and of the Central section in A.D. 646–592 and 416–370.

== Flora and fauna ==
Lake Ellery is entirely surrounded by native forest. The dominant trees are rimu and kahikatea, with some kāmahi, silver beech, and miro; beech becomes the dominant canopy tree at the lake's northwestern end. In more exposed areas with poorer soil, such as bluffs and on the lake's single island, manoao, mānuka, and yellow-silver pine (Lepidothamnus intermedius) become dominant, along with mountain toatoa and southern rātā.

Along the Lake Ellery Track other species such as mountain horopito (Pseudowintera colorata), broadleaf (Griselinia littoralis), Hall's tōtara, and mataī can be seen, and there are numerous ferns on the forest floor, including Austroblechnum colensoi.

Yellow-crowned kākāriki (Cyanoramphus auriceps) can be spotted along the Lake Ellery Track, and kākā are also present. Waterfowl include little shag (Phalacrocorax melanoleucas) and black shag (P. carbo), as well as grey duck (Anas superciliosa) and scaup (Aythya novaeseelandiae). Forest birds such as tomtit, pīpipi, fantail, grey warbler, tūī, and kererū are often seen. Birds were formerly much more abundant: in 1940, Jackson Bay resident Dan Greaney described the forests around Lake Ellery as "reverberating with an unbroken roll of enthralling melody".

For those interested in natural history, Kerry-Jayne Wilson described Lake Ellery's outflow as "one of the most beautiful, tranquil and interesting sections of creek in South Westland."

== See also ==
- Lakes of New Zealand
