= Water fern =

Water fern is a common name for several plants and may refer to:

- Salviniales, an order of aquatic ferns
- Austroblechnum lanceolatum, syn. Blechnum chambersii, lance water fern
- Austroblechnum patersonii, syn. Blechnum patersonii, or strap water fern
- Austroblechnum penna-marina, syn. Blechnum penna-marina, or alpine water fern
- Azolla filiculoides
- Bolbitis heudelotii, or African water fern
- Cranfillia fluviatilis, syn. Blechnum fluviatile, or ray water fern
- Histiopteris incisa
- Lomaria nuda, syn. Blechnum nudum, or fishbone water fern
- Oceaniopteris cartilaginea, syn. Blechnum cartilagineum, or soft water fern
- Osmunda regalis
- Parablechnum wattsii, syn. Blechnum wattsii, or hard water fern
- Regnellidium diphyllum, or two-leaf water fern
- Salvinia molesta, or giant water fern
- Telmatoblechnum indicum, syn. Blechnum indicum, or swamp water fern
