= Physical =

Physical may refer to:

- Physical examination, a regular overall check-up with a doctor
- Physical education
- Physical (Olivia Newton-John album), 1981
  - "Physical" (Olivia Newton-John song)
- Physical (Gabe Gurnsey album)
- "Physical" (Alcazar song) (2004)
- "Physical" (Enrique Iglesias song) (2014)
- "Physical" (Dua Lipa song) (2020)
- "Physical (You're So)", a 1980 song by Adam & the Ants, the B side to "Dog Eat Dog"
- Physical (TV series), an American television series
- Physical: 100, a Korean reality show on Netflix
- Physicalism
