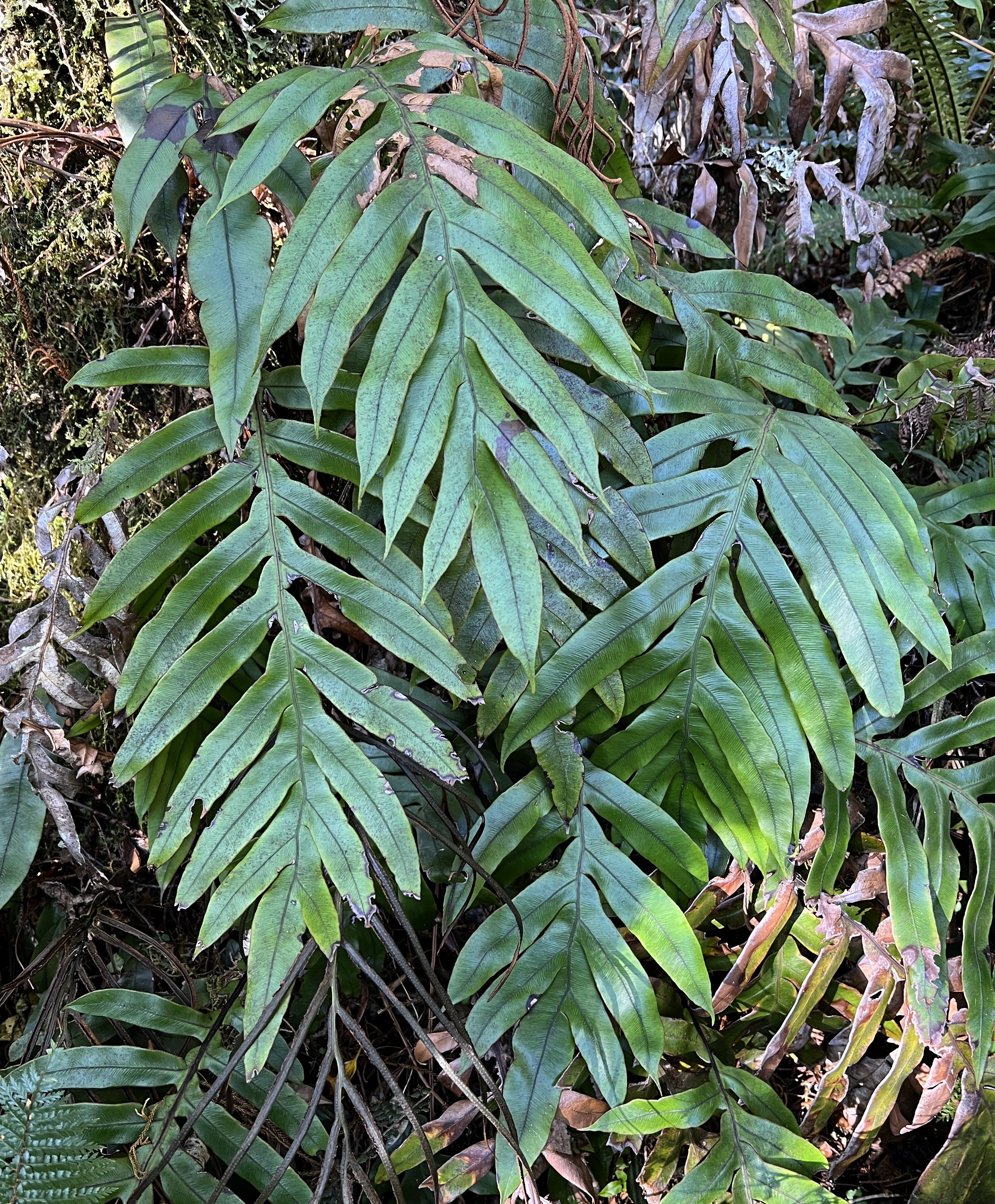
- Austroblechnum colensoi beside Ellery Stream, Lake Ellery, south Westland

Scientific classification
- Kingdom: Plantae
- Clade: Tracheophytes
- Division: Polypodiophyta
- Class: Polypodiopsida
- Order: Polypodiales
- Suborder: Aspleniineae
- Family: Blechnaceae
- Genus: Austroblechnum
- Species: A. colensoi

Binomial name
- Austroblechnum colensoi (Hook.f.) Gasper & V.A.O.Dittrich

Synonyms
- Blechnum colensoi (Hook.f.) Wakef.; Lomaria colensoi Hook.f.; Lomaria heterophylla Colenso

= Austroblechnum colensoi =

Species of fern

Austroblechnum colensoi, synonym Blechnum colensoi, also known as Colenso's hard fern, waterfall fern or peretao is a species of fern native to New Zealand. It is distributed throughout the North, South and Stewart Islands.

Austroblechnum colensoi is usually found in dark areas with good access to water, such as steep banks, river gorges and rocky overhangs.
