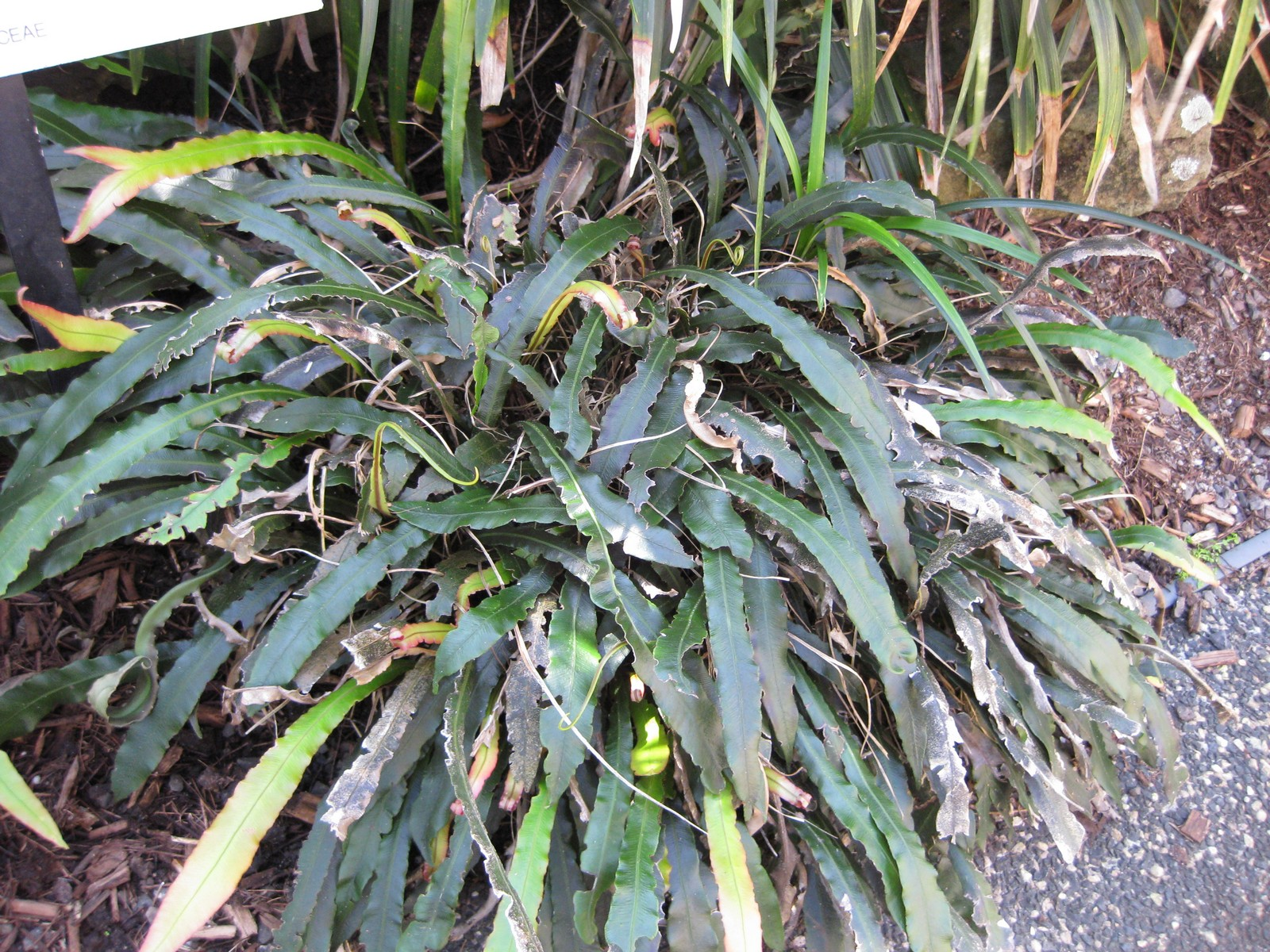
- In the Royal Botanic Gardens, Sydney

Scientific classification
- Kingdom: Plantae
- Clade: Tracheophytes
- Division: Polypodiophyta
- Class: Polypodiopsida
- Order: Polypodiales
- Suborder: Aspleniineae
- Family: Blechnaceae
- Genus: Austroblechnum
- Species: A. patersonii

Binomial name
- Austroblechnum patersonii (R.Br.) Gasper & V.A.O.Dittrich

Synonyms
- Blechnum patersonii (R.Br.) Mett.; Lomaria patersonii (R.Br.) Spreng.; Lomaria punctata Blume; Salpichlaena patersonii (R.Br.) Fée; Spicanta patersonii (R.Br.) Kuntze; Stegania patersonii R.Br.

= Austroblechnum patersonii =

Species of fern

Austroblechnum patersonii, synonym Blechnum patersonii, is a fern in the family Blechnaceae. It is known as the strap water-fern.

It is native to eastern Australia (Queensland, New South Wales, Victoria and Tasmania), Lord Howe Island, New Zealand and the Society Islands (Tahiti).
