= Physical (Gabe Gurnsey album) =

Studio album by Gabe Gurnsey
- Released: 3 August 2018
- Length: 50:58
- Label: Phantasy

Singles from Physical
- 1. "Eyes Over" Released: 11 June 2018; 2. "Harder Rhythm" Released: 16 July 2018

Physical is the debut studio album by English musician and Factory Floor lead vocalist Gabe Gurnsey. It was released on 3 August 2018, under Phantasy.

== Release ==
On 11 June 2018, Gurnsey released the first single "Eyes Over". The second single "Harder Rhythm" was released on 16 July 2018.

== Critical reception ==
Professional ratings
Aggregate scores
Source	Rating
AnyDecentMusic?	7.3/10
Metacritic	79/100
Review scores
Source	Rating
The 405	7/10
AllMusic	4/5 stars
Drowned in Sound	7/10
God Is in the TV	8/10
The Line of Best Fit	7.5/10
Loud and Quiet	8/10
MusicOMH	3.5/5 stars

Physical was met with "generally favorable" reviews from critics. At Metacritic, which assigns a weighted average rating out of 100 to reviews from mainstream publications, this release received an average score of 79, based on 9 reviews. AllMusic's review gave it 4 out of 5 stars, saying that "Physical provides ample proof that he can take the skills he's honed with that group [Factory Floor] in entertainingly different directions." Aggregator Album of the Year gave the release a 74 out of 100 based on a critical consensus of 8 reviews.

=== Accolades ===
Accolades for Physical
Publication	Accolade	Rank
BBC Radio 6 Music	BBC Radio 6 Music's Top 10 Albums of 2018	6
Loud and Quiet	Loud and Quiet's Top 40 Albums of 2018	8
The Quietus	The Quietus' Top 100 Albums of 2018	36
Rough Trade Records	Rough Trade's Top 100 Albums of 2018	33

== Track listing ==
Physical track listing
No.	Title	Length
1.	"Ultra Clear Sound"	4:03
2.	"You Can"	3:33
3.	"Temazzy"	3:40
4.	"Harder Rhythm"	5:18
5.	"Sweet Heat"	3:27
6.	"New Kind"	3:12
7.	"Heavy Rubber"	3:42
8.	"In States"	0:39
9.	"I Get"	5:30
10.	"Version"	0:27
11.	"Eyes Over"	5:27
12.	"AM Crystal"	1:03
13.	"Night Track"	6:32
14.	"The Last Channel"	4:25

== Charts ==
Chart performance for Physical
Chart (2018)	Peak position
UK Independent Albums (Official Charts)	26
