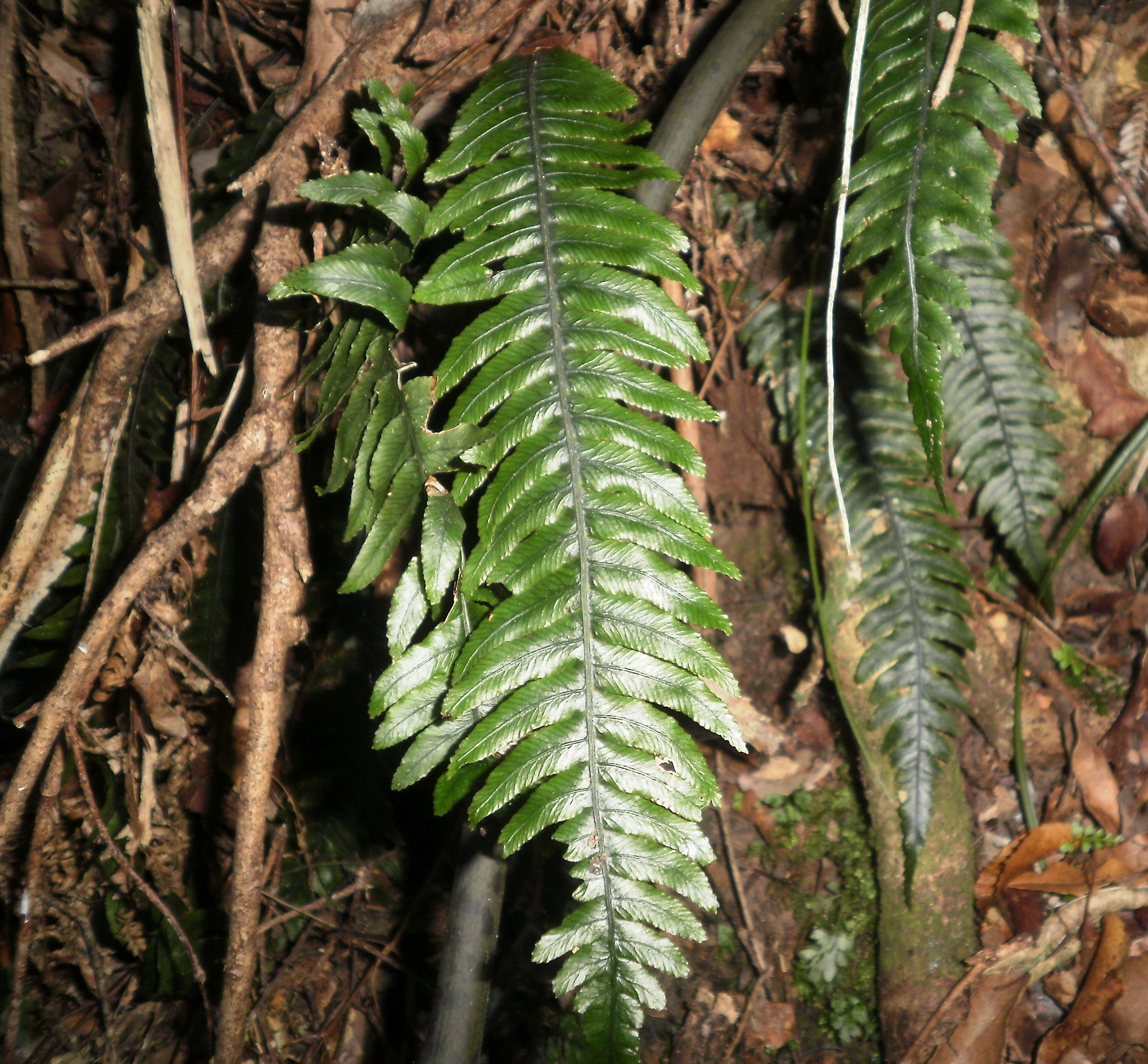

Scientific classification
- Kingdom: Plantae
- Clade: Tracheophytes
- Division: Polypodiophyta
- Class: Polypodiopsida
- Order: Polypodiales
- Suborder: Aspleniineae
- Family: Blechnaceae
- Genus: Austroblechnum
- Species: A. lanceolatum

Binomial name
- Austroblechnum lanceolatum (R.Br.) Gasper & V.A.O.Dittrich

Synonyms
- Acrostichum nanum (Fée) Hook.; Austroblechnum doodioides (Brack.) Gasper & V.A.O.Dittrich; Blechnum chambersii Tind.; Blechnum doodioides (Brack.) Brownlie; Blechnum lanceolatum (R.Br.) Sturm; Egonolfia nana Fée; Lomaria doodioides Brack.; Lomaria lanceolata (R.Br.) Spreng.; Spicanta lanceolata (R.Br.) Kuntze; Stegania lanceolata R.Br.; Struthiopteris lanceolata (R.Br.) Ching

= Austroblechnum lanceolatum =

Species of plant

Austroblechnum lanceolatum, synonym Blechnum chambersii, is a species of fern within the family Blechnaceae, found in Australia, New Zealand, Samoa and Fiji. It is indigenous to Australia and New Zealand.

A. lanceolatum is commonly called lance water fern, and in New Zealand it is also referred to by its Māori names, nini and rereti.

== Description ==
A medium-sized fern with tufted fronds 85-700mm in length. The fronds are strongly dimorphic with differing sterile and fertile fronds. Both frond types are 15-115mm wide.

== Distribution ==
A. lanceolatum is found in the southeast of Australia as well as on Samoa, Fiji and on the North Island of New Zealand and in many of the coastal forests of South Island of New Zealand.

It is the host species for the New Zealand endemic moth Batrachedra litterata.
