= João Bá =

- João Bá in 2011

Background information
- Born: João Batista Oliveira; September 1, 1932; Crisópolis, Bahia, Brazil
- Died: October 3, 2019 (aged 87) Caldas, Minas Gerais, Brazil
- Genres: Baião; coco; xote; música popular brasileira; folk music
- Occupations: Singer, songwriter, guitarist, actor, poet, storyteller
- Years active: 1966–2019

João Batista Oliveira (1 September 1932 – 3 October 2019), known as João Bá, was a Brazilian singer, songwriter, guitarist, actor, poet, and storyteller. His work is situated within the field of regional music and Brazilian popular culture and often addresses nature and life in the sertão.

== Biography and career ==
João Bá was born on September 1, 1932, in Crisópolis, in the sertão of Bahia. The son of poor farmers, he began working in the fields as a child to help his family. According to him, he started composing and singing around the age of twelve. His difficult childhood and his closeness to nature frequently appear in his work. In his adolescence, he took part in small theatrical productions in his hometown and wrote poems and sertanejo songs. At the age of 20, he moved to São Paulo, where he worked at a pharmacy in the Mooca neighborhood and continued to write poetry and music.

In 1966, João Bá had his song "Madeira Encarnada" censored by the military dictatorship at the first edition of the Festival da Música Popular Brasileira, promoted by TV Record. The censorship interpreted the lyrics as a veiled reference to an official and as social criticism. He did not perform at the festival, but the episode made his name known in music circles.

In 1979, he took part in TV Tupi's Festival 79 with "Facho de Fogo," composed in partnership with Vidal França and performed by Diana Pequeno.

João Bá's work comprises more than two hundred compositions, many of them recorded by Hermeto Pascoal, Almir Sater, Diana Pequeno, Dércio Marques, and Marlui Miranda. He released his albums with his own resources or with support from partners, maintaining autonomy over repertoire and production. His first album, "Carrancas," came out in 1988, about 22 years after his participation in festivals.

His discography includes Carrancas I-II (1994), Ação dos Bacuraus Cantantes (1997), Pica-Pau Amarelo (2003), 50 Anos de Carreira (2004), and Cavaleiro Macunaíma – João Bá 80 Anos (2014).

João Bá also worked in theater, television, and film. He wrote the program Cercanias de Canudos (1984), broadcast by TV Cultura and voted the network's best program of the year. He presented the special Casa dos Cantadores (1985) and took part in Som Brasil, Viola, Minha Viola, and Bambalalão. In film, he acted in Fronteira das Almas (1987) and Mário (2000), both directed by Hermano Penna, and composed the soundtrack for the documentary Nas Terras do Bem-Virá (2007). In theater, he received the awards for Best Soundtrack and Best Costume Design at the SESC Consolação Theater Festival in 1981 for the production "Marrueiro."

João Bá spent his last years on his small farm in the municipality of Caldas, in the south of Minas Gerais. He died there on October 3, 2019, at the age of 87.

== Discography ==
- Carrancas (1988)
- Carrancas I-II (1994)
- Ação dos Bacuraus Cantantes (1997)
- Pica-Pau Amarelo (2003)
- 50 Anos de Carreira (2004)
- Aruanã (2005)
- João Bá para Crianças – Amigo Folharal (2010)
- Cavaleiro Macunaíma – João Bá 80 Anos (2014)
