= Pilularia americana =

Scientific classification
- Kingdom: Plantae
- Clade: Tracheophytes
- Division: Polypodiophyta
- Class: Polypodiopsida
- Order: Salviniales
- Family: Marsileaceae
- Genus: Pilularia
- Species: P. americana

Binomial name
- Pilularia americana A.Braun

Species of aquatic plant

Pilularia americana, the American pillwort, is an unusual species of fern. The fronds essentially consist of the petioles only, any form of flattened laminae having been lost. It is in the aquatic fern family Marsileaceae, and is related to the water clovers and also to Azolla and Salvinia.

== Description ==
The pillwort, along with all other aquatic ferns in the order Salviniales, exhibits heterospory and forms hard, seed-like sporocarps, as do the other members of the order. The sporocarps are distinctly different from the closely related genus Marsilea because they are globose in Pilularia, while they are flattened in Marsilea. The ferns in the genus Pilularia also have lost their leaf blades, with only the grass-like stipe remaining. However, this plant retains the circinate vernation characteristic of most ferns.

== Distribution ==
The range of the American pillwort is well-established throughout much of California and south-central Oregon. However, mostly only local occurrences have been found elsewhere in eastern North America. It is uncertain whether this reflects a genuinely sporadic occurrence, or whether this is a reflection of the fact that this is a small, grasslike, extremely easily overlooked plant. Close examination is often necessary to ascertain that this is a Pilularia. The species also occurs through Central and South America, although scientific investigation may confirm those plants to be a separate species, P. mandoni A. Braun.

Recent research has determined that the North American plants normally assigned to P. americana are actually two different (cryptic) species. The plants in most of the United States range are true americana, while plants in southernmost California and Mexico are different, and are in fact very close genetically to the Australian and New Zealand species, Pilularia novae-hollandiae, and may possibly be eventually regarded as part of that species.

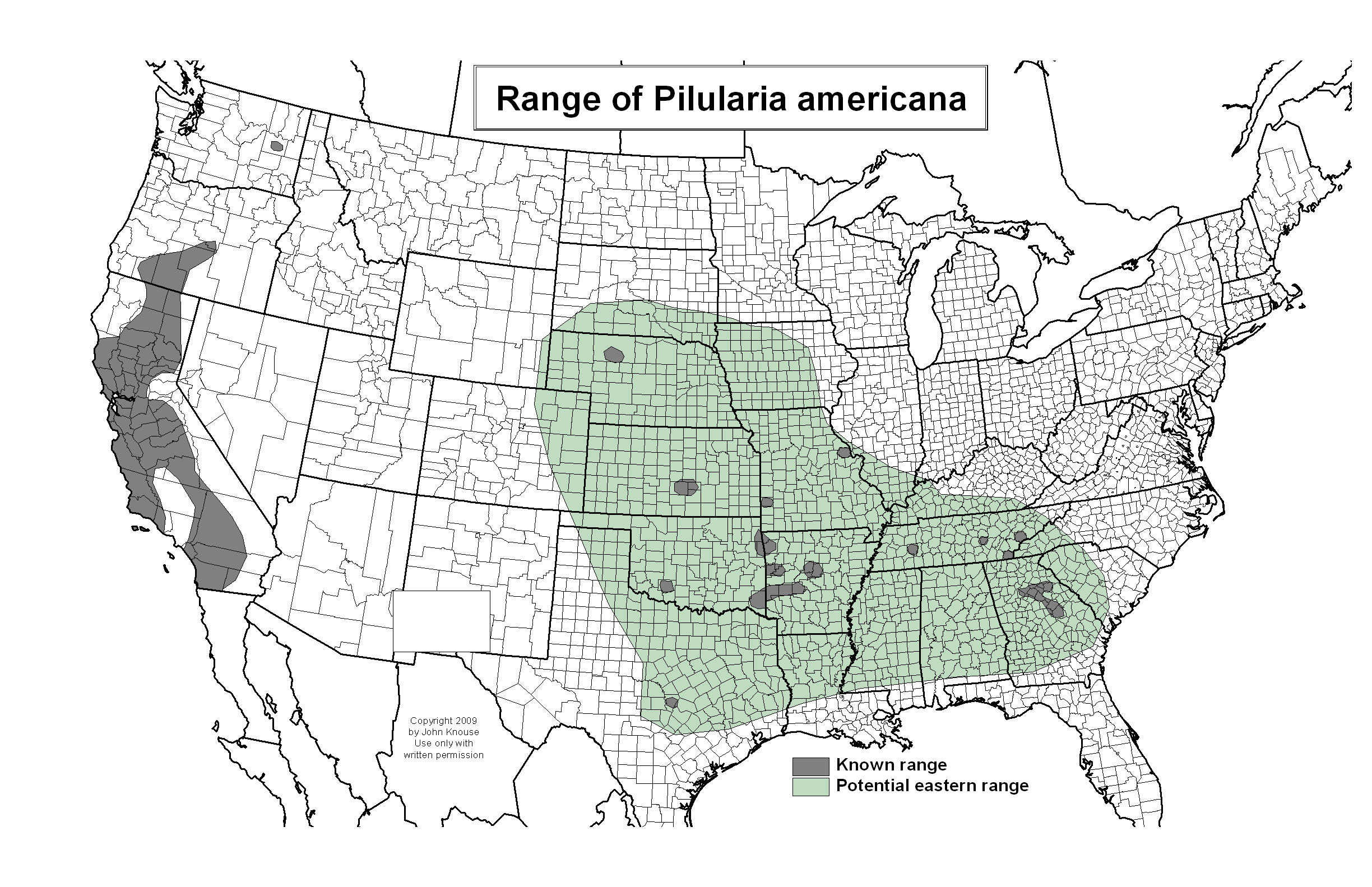

== Cultivation ==
This plant is easily grown given a suitable habitat and kept uncrowded. The pillwort also may die out for drier or colder parts of the season, regenerating the next year from the sporocarps. While it is in the aquatic fern group, it prefers to be emergent (in shallow water, with fronds emerging into the air) or growing completely emersed (fronds completely out of water), though preferring to be rooted in wet mud.
