= P. americana =

P. americana may refer to:

- Paradelphomyia americana, a crane fly species in the genus Paradelphomyia
- Periplaneta americana, the American cockroach, palmetto bug or waterbug
- Persea americana, the avocado, aguacate, palta, butter pear or alligator pear tree
- Pilularia americana, the American pillwort, an aquatic fern species
- Prunus americana, a species of plum tree
- Phytolacca americana

== See also ==
- Americana (disambiguation)
