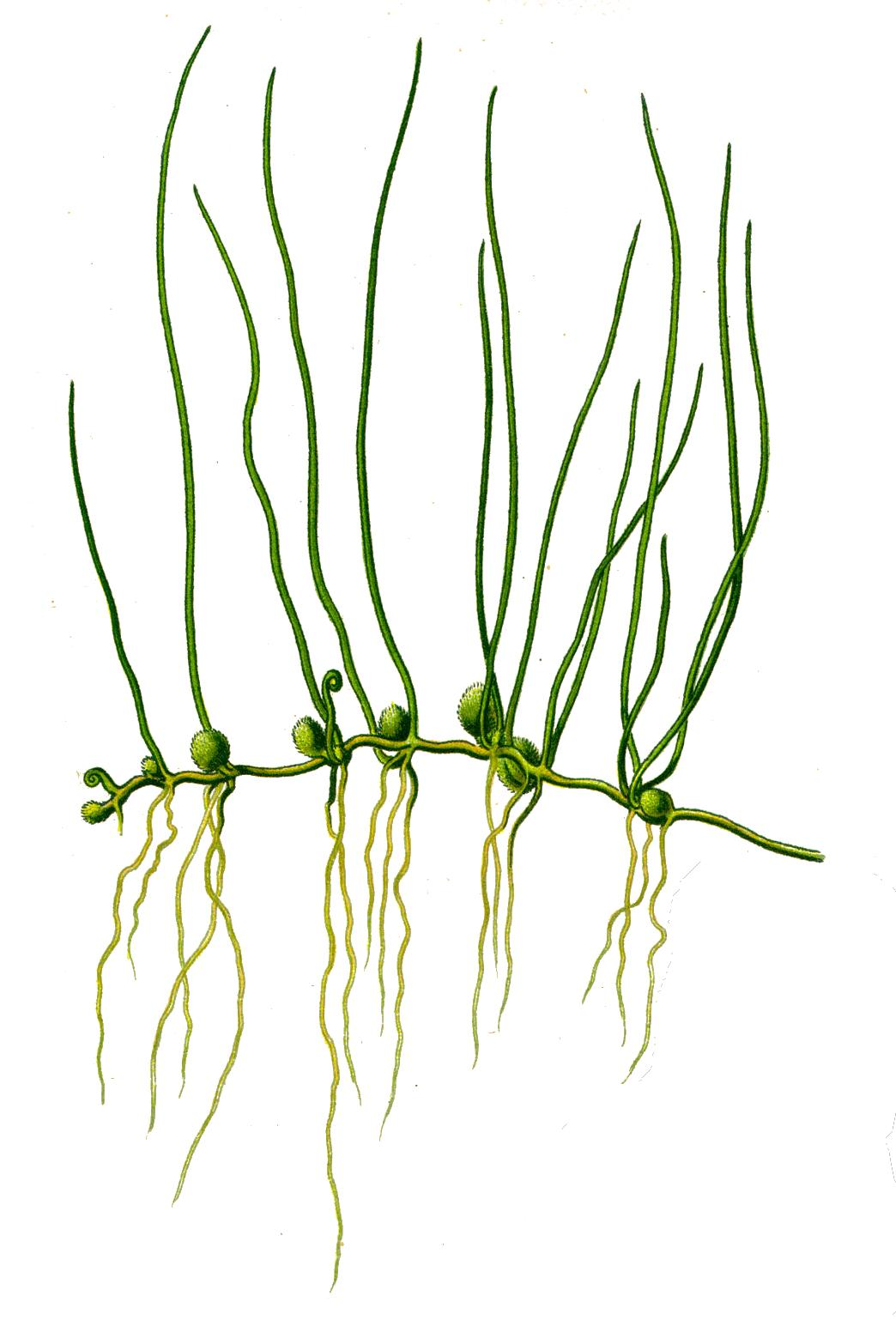

Conservation status
- Least Concern (IUCN 3.1)

Scientific classification
- Kingdom: Plantae
- Clade: Embryophytes
- Clade: Tracheophytes
- Division: Polypodiophyta
- Class: Polypodiopsida
- Order: Salviniales
- Family: Marsileaceae
- Genus: Pilularia
- Species: P. globulifera

Binomial name
- Pilularia globulifera L.

= Pilularia globulifera =

Species of fern

Pilularia globulifera, or pillwort, is an unusual species of fern in the family Marsileaceae. It is native to western Europe, where it grows at the edges of lakes, ponds, ditches and marshes, on wet clay or clay-sand soil, sometimes in water up to 30 cm (12 in) deep.

== Description ==
Pillwort has slender, cylindrical, rush-like fronds up to 8 cm (3.1 in) tall that are shaped like croziers as they unfurl. It has a pea-shaped, 4-chambered sporocarp about 3 mm (0.1 in) in diameter, each chamber formed from a modified leaf and containing several sori bearing both megasporangia and microsporangia. The species is thus heterosporous.

== Habitat ==
Pillwort grows on silt and mud at the margins of lakes, ponds and other watercourses that are submerged for at least part of the year. Some of the plants growing in association with this species in the UK include water celery (Apium inundatum), marsh pennywort (Hydrocotyle vulgaris) and lesser spearwort (Ranunculus flammula). In its habitat in shallow water on pond margins or in poached wet grassland, it seems to grow well in bare locations where it faces little competition. Populations vary greatly from year to year; it sometimes "disappears" from a site only to recur there many years later, and cleaning out a ditch may stimulate it to reappear.

== Distribution ==
This is a rare species, declining as its wetland habitats are reduced by eutrophication and drainage, but is regarded as of least concern by the IUCN Red List. It is listed on Schedule 8 of the Wildlife (Northern Ireland) Order 1985, but it has not been seen there since 1970 and may now be extinct in the province. It is protected under the Wildlife and Countryside Act 1981 in the rest of the UK, where it is now classified as vulnerable. It is listed as threatened or endangered in nearly all the countries in which it grows.

== Uses ==
Pillwort can be grown in a "bog garden" or as a marginal aquatic in a garden pond.
