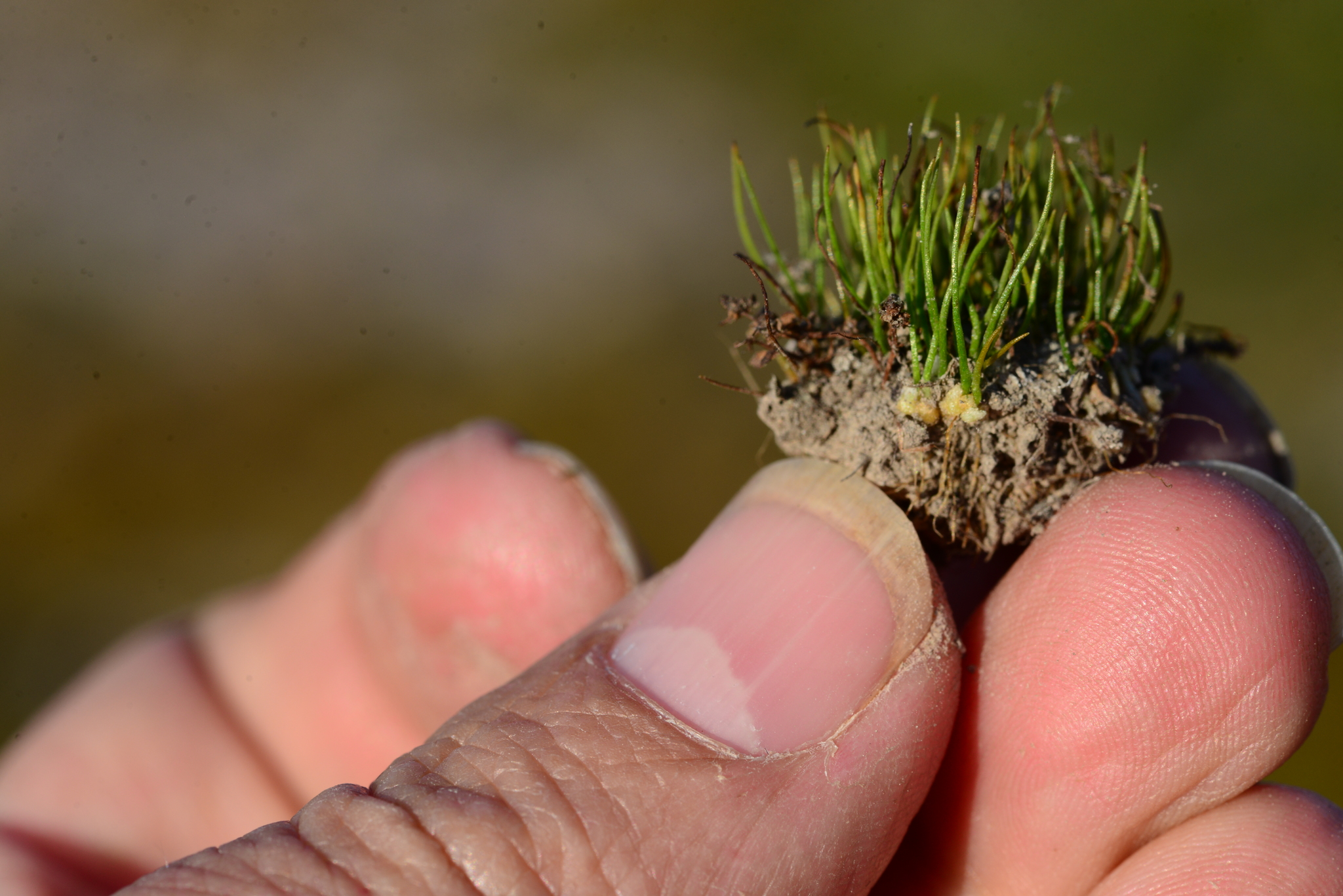
- Pilularia minuta photographed in Morocco

Conservation status
- Endangered (IUCN 3.1)

Scientific classification
- Kingdom: Plantae
- Clade: Tracheophytes
- Division: Polypodiophyta
- Class: Polypodiopsida
- Order: Salviniales
- Family: Marsileaceae
- Genus: Pilularia
- Species: P. minuta

Binomial name
- Pilularia minuta Durieu

Synonyms
- Calamistrum minutum Kuntze; Pilularia globulifera subsp. minuta (Durieu) Bonnier & Layens

= Pilularia minuta =

Species of fern

Pilularia minuta is a species of fern in the family Marsileaceae. It is an ephemeral species that relies on seasonal flooding. Though widely distributed across the Mediterranean basin, it is considered an endangered species due to habitat fragmentation.

== Distribution and habitat ==
Pilularia minuta has a fragmented distribution across the Mediterranean basin and can be found in Algeria, Croatia, Cyprus, France (mainland France and Corsica), Greece (east Aegean Islands), Italy (mainland Italy, Sardinia, and Sicily), Morocco, Portugal, Spain (mainland Spain and the Balearic Islands), Tunisia, and Turkey. It grows in temporary freshwater pools at low elevations in a diverse range of habitats including forests, matorrals, and agricultural lands.

== Description ==
Pilularia minuta is a small and delicate fern. The creeping stem measures approximately 4–6 cm (1.6–2.4 in) long and 0.5–0.7 mm (0.020–0.028 in) in diameter. Each mature stem consists of twelve or more segments, with individual internodes measuring 3–8 mm (0.12–0.31 in) long. The nodes each bear a single leaf, one or two roots, and sometimes a new bud or branch. The roots are usually simple but may be branched. The upright, slender leaves measure 35–40 mm (1.4–1.6 in) long and 0.5–0.7 mm (0.020–0.028 in) in diameter. When fruiting, the sporocarp, bearing a spherical capsule, arises from a stem node at the base of the leaf and is covered in tawny hairs. Mature sporocarps are borne on 1.5–2.5 mm (0.059–0.098 in) peduncles.

== Ecology ==
Pilularia minuta is an amphibious annual plant with a short life cycle that requires high light levels and grows only on non-calcareous substrates. Stems and leaves begin to develop in flooded conditions from late February to early March, with the plant drying out and dying between May and June. Sporocarps form after the leaves have matured, while the plant is still submerged, but only mature once the plant has dried out. The spores are capable of surviving this dry period, but can only germinate when the substrate is completely saturated.

== Conservation status ==
Pilularia minuta is listed as endangered on the International Union for the Conservation of Nature's Red List under criteria B2ab(i, ii, iii, iv, v), based on its small and fragmented area of occupancy. The population appears to be in decline as a result of habitat destruction.

P. minuta is protected in Europe under the Bern Convention and conserved ex situ by the Conservatoire botanique national méditerranéen de Porquerolles in Porquerolles, France.
