= Anders Fredrik Regnell =

Swedish botanist (1807–1884)

Anders Regnell
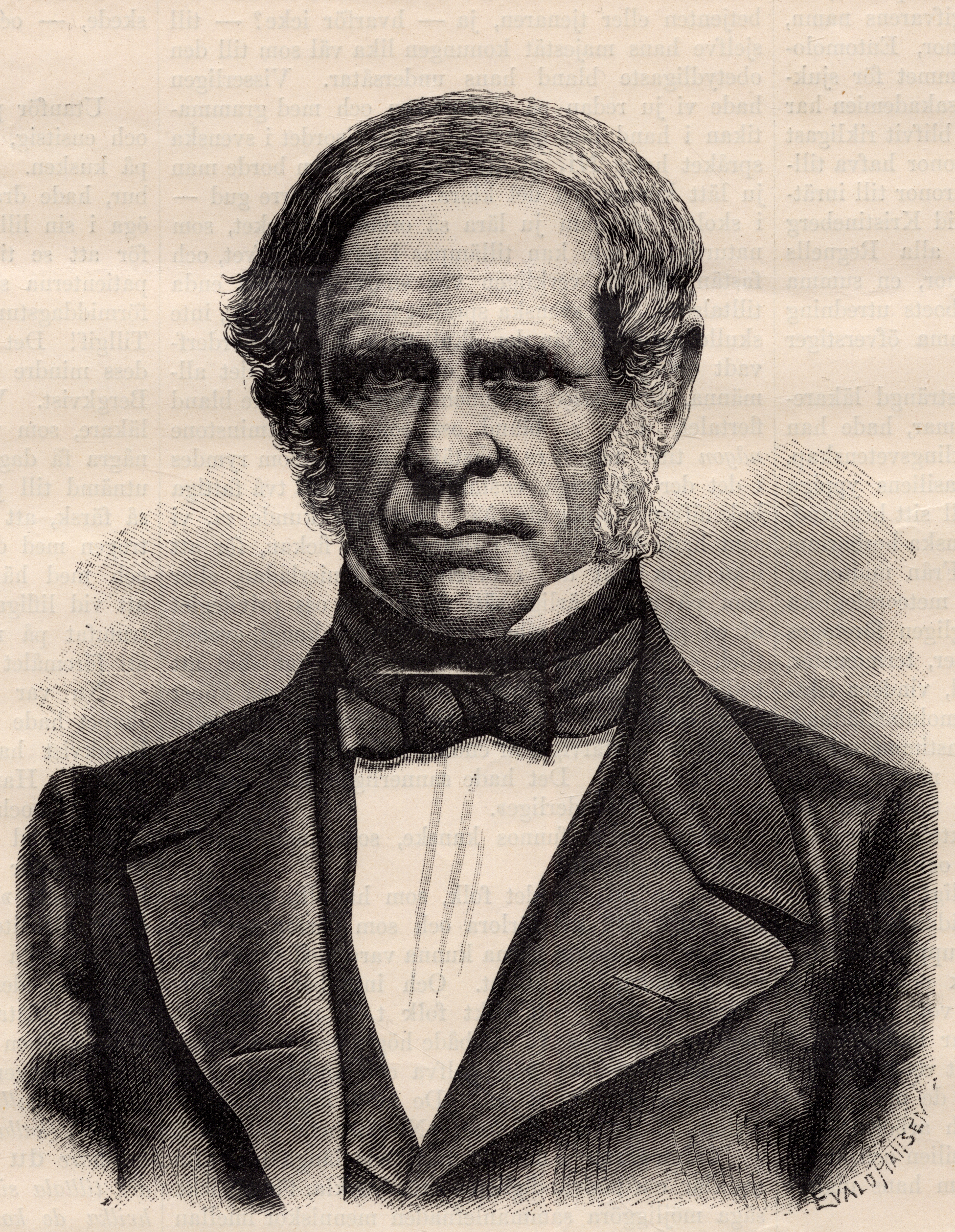
- Anders Regnell
- Born: 8 June 1807; Stockholm
- Died: 12 September 1884 (aged 77); Caldas
- Education: University of Uppsala
- Scientific career
- Fields: botany

Anders Fredrik Regnell (8 June 1807 – 12 September 1884) was a Swedish mesical doctor and botanist. He studied in Uppsala and received his medical doctorate in 1837. As a student he served as assistant to Anders Retzius in Stockholm. He served in various capacities at the Serafimerlasarettet in Stockholm, and participated as ship surgeon aboard the corvette "Jarramas” on its expedition in the Mediterranean Sea during 1839–40.

Regnell was born in Stockholm, Sweden, but because of poor health, he suffered from a serious lung disease. He left Sweden for Brazil in 1840 and settled in Caldas, in the province of Minas Gerais, where he spent the rest of his life. There Regnell acquired considerable reputation as a practicing physician and consequently a substantial fortune.

Regnell made substantial collections of plants which he sent to Europe, in particular to Scandinavian museums. He also studied the Brazilian fauna and made extensive geological and meteorological observations.

Having accumulated considerable wealth, he financially supported several European botanists and donated large sums to various scientific institutions at home. He bequeathed his estate to the University of Uppsala.

== Honors ==
The plant genera of Regnellia Barb.Rodr. (a synonym of Bletia Ruiz & Pav. Orchidaceae,), Regnellidium Lindm. (Marsileaceae,) and Neoregnellia (family Malvaceae,) as well as many species were named in his honor.

Regnell was an honorary member of the Learned Societies of Uppsala and Gothenburg, and of the Swedish and Uppsala Medical Associations. He was awarded an Honorary Doctorate in Philosophy from the University of Uppsala in 1877.

Regnell died in Caldas, Brazil, and is buried in Uppsala’s old cemetery. In 1903 a memorial monument in Caldas, Brazil was dedicated to him. In Uppsala, the building housing the Dag Hammarskjöld and Law Library of the University of Uppsala is named Regnellianum.

== Sources ==
- K.V. Ossian Dahlgren Anders Fredrik Regnell and his Swedish guests in Brazil. Svensk. Botan. Tidskr. 56:3, 1962.
