= Hydropteris =

Scientific classification
- Kingdom: Plantae
- Clade: Tracheophytes
- Division: Polypodiophyta
- Class: Polypodiopsida
- Order: Salviniales
- Family: †Hydropteridaceae
- Genus: †Hydropteris; Rothwell & Stockey
- Species: †H. pinnata

Binomial name
- †Hydropteris pinnata Rothwell & Stockey

Extinct genus of fern

Hydropteris is an extinct genus of heterosporous pteridophytes in the order Salviniales. The genus comprises a single species, Hydropteris pinnata. Fossils of the genus were found in southern Alberta, Canada in the St. Mary River Formation, which corresponds to the Upper Cretaceous, Maastrichtian.

== Description ==
This fern shares many features with other members of the Salviniales. Hydropteris possesses sporocarps like those in Marsileaceae, but megaspore complexes like those in Salviniaceae (assignable to the sporae dispersae genus Parazolla Hall.), and has leaves like non-heterosporous ferns. This combination of traits has made the phylogenetic placement of Hydropteris within Salviniales difficult to establish. Two hypotheses have been proposed. The first is of Hydropteris as sister to Salvinia and Azolla and the second is of Hydropteris as the earliest diverging member of the heterosporous water ferns.
