= Kiyosu-e Formation =

Geologic formation in Japan

- Stratigraphic range: Callovian-Berriasian; ~163–140 Ma
- Type: Geological formation
- Unit of: Toyonishi Group

Lithology
- Primary: Sandstone
- Other: Siltstone

Location
- Coordinates: 34.1°N 131.0°E
- Approximate paleocoordinates: 40.9°N 139.5°E
- Region: Yamaguchi Prefecture
- Country: Japan
- Kiyosu-e Formation (Japan)

The Kiyosu-e Formation is a Middle Jurassic (Callovian) to Early Cretaceous (Berriasian) geologic formation of the Toyonishi Group in Yamaguchi Prefecture, Japan. Fossil ornithopod tracks have been reported from the formation.

== Fossil content ==
The following fossils have been reported from the formation:

- Ichnofossils
  - Iguanodontidae indet.
  - Theropoda indet.
- Flora
  - Regnellites nagashimae
  - Otozamites sp.

== See also ==
- List of dinosaur-bearing rock formations
  - List of stratigraphic units with ornithischian tracks
    - Ornithopod tracks
