= Regnellites =

Regnellites Temporal range: Jurassic or Cretaceous

Scientific classification
- Kingdom: Plantae
- Clade: Tracheophytes
- Division: Polypodiophyta
- Class: Polypodiopsida
- Order: Salviniales
- Family: Marsileaceae
- Genus: †Regnellites; T.Yamada & M.Kato
- Species: †R. nagashimae

Binomial name
- †Regnellites nagashimae T.Yamada & M.Kato

Extinct genus of ferns

Regnellites nagashimae is the oldest known fossil belonging to the fern family Marsileaceae. It comes from rocks of the Upper Jurassic or Lower Cretaceous Kiyosu-e Formation of Japan. The fossils include leaves with visible veins, as well as sporocarps.
