= Neoregnellia =

Scientific classification
- Kingdom: Plantae
- Clade: Tracheophytes
- Clade: Angiosperms
- Clade: Eudicots
- Clade: Rosids
- Order: Malvales
- Family: Malvaceae
- Genus: Neoregnellia; Urb.
- Species: N. cubensis

Binomial name
- Neoregnellia cubensis Urb.

Species of flowering plant

Neoregnellia is a genus of flowering plants belonging to the family Malvaceae. It just contains one species, Neoregnellia cubensis.

Its native range is the Caribbean region. It is found in the Cayman Islands, Cuba, Dominican Republic and Haiti.

The genus name of Neoregnellia is in honour of Anders Fredrik Regnell (1807–1884), a Swedish physician and botanist. The Latin specific epithet of cubensis means "coming from Cuba" (where the plant was found). Both the genus and the species were first described and published in Repert. Spec. Nov. Regni Veg. Vol.20 on page 306-307 in 1924.
