= Paradelphomyia =

Scientific classification
- Kingdom: Animalia
- Phylum: Arthropoda
- Class: Insecta
- Order: Diptera
- Family: Limoniidae
- Subfamily: Limnophilinae
- Genus: Paradelphomyia; Alexander, 1936

Type species
- Adelphomyia crossospila Alexander, 1936

Subgenera
- Oxyrhiza de Meijere, 1946; Paradelphomyia Alexander, 1936

Synonyms
- Haploneura Loew, 1850

Genus of flies

Paradelphomyia is a genus of crane flies in the family Limoniidae.

== Species ==
- Subgenus Oxyrhiza de Meijere, 1946

- P. aberdarica Alexander, 1956
- P. aequatorialis (Alexander, 1944)
- P. alticola Alexander, 1956
- P. amabilis Alexander, 1954
- P. americana (Alexander, 1912)
- P. angustistyla Alexander, 1970
- P. annulipes Alexander, 1960
- P. ariana (Alexander, 1930)
- P. bhava Alexander, 1956
- P. bigladia Alexander, 1970
- P. bilobata Alexander, 1957
- P. brachyphallus Alexander, 1956
- P. brevifurca Savchenko, 1976
- P. cayuga (Alexander, 1912)
- P. cerina (Alexander, 1936)
- P. chosenica Alexander, 1950
- P. costaricensis (Alexander, 1922)
- P. cycnea Stary & Freidberg, 2007
- P. czizekiana Stary, 1971
- P. dalei (Edwards, 1939)
- P. deprivata Alexander, 1954
- P. destituta (Alexander, 1945)
- P. dichromata Alexander, 1965
- P. dissita Alexander, 1960
- P. distivena Alexander, 1954
- P. dolonigra Alexander, 1970
- P. ecalcarata (Edwards, 1938)
- P. faurei (Alexander, 1923)
- P. flavescens (Brunetti, 1911)
- P. furcata (Brunetti, 1912)
- P. fuscula (Loew, 1873)
- P. hkayamensis Alexander, 1965
- P. indulcata Alexander, 1958
- P. interposita Savchenko, 1976
- P. issikina (Alexander, 1930)
- P. krisna Alexander, 1957
- P. laterostriata Savchenko, 1976
- P. latissima (Alexander, 1932)
- P. macracantha Alexander, 1957
- P. maddocki (Alexander, 1948)
- P. majuscula (Alexander, 1936)
- P. manopi Alexander, 1956
- P. marginipuncta Alexander, 1974
- P. megacera Alexander, 1958
- P. mexicana (Alexander, 1940)
- P. minuta (Alexander, 1911)
- P. minutoides Alexander, 1954
- P. mitra Alexander, 1953
- P. morelosensis (Alexander, 1946)
- P. myriacantha Alexander, 1965
- P. nebulosa (de Meijere, 1913)
- P. newar Alexander, 1958
- P. nielseni (Kuntze, 1919)
- P. nigrina (Lackschewitz, 1940)
- P. nimbicolor Alexander, 1950
- P. nipponensis (Alexander, 1924)
- P. nubifera Alexander, 1954
- P. oaxacensis (Alexander, 1946)
- P. pacifica (Alexander, 1944)
- P. paucimacula Alexander, 1956
- P. perumbrosa Alexander, 1950
- P. platymera Alexander, 1972
- P. pleuralis (Dietz, 1921)
- P. pleurolinea Alexander, 1950
- P. polysticta (Edwards, 1934)
- P. prayooni Alexander, 1954
- P. pugilis Alexander, 1973
- P. pygmaea Savchenko, 1973
- P. recurvans Alexander, 1956
- P. reducta (Alexander, 1938)
- P. ruficolor Alexander, 1965
- P. senilis (Haliday, 1833)
- P. sierrensis Alexander, 1958
- P. subnebulosa (Alexander, 1936)
- P. subterminalis Alexander, 1958
- P. tritumula Alexander, 1965
- P. ugandae (Riedel, 1914)
- P. umbrosa (Edwards, 1916)
- P. venezolana Alexander, 1950
- P. vumbensis (Alexander, 1946)

- Subgenus Paradelphomyia Alexander, 1936

- P. crossospila (Alexander, 1936)
