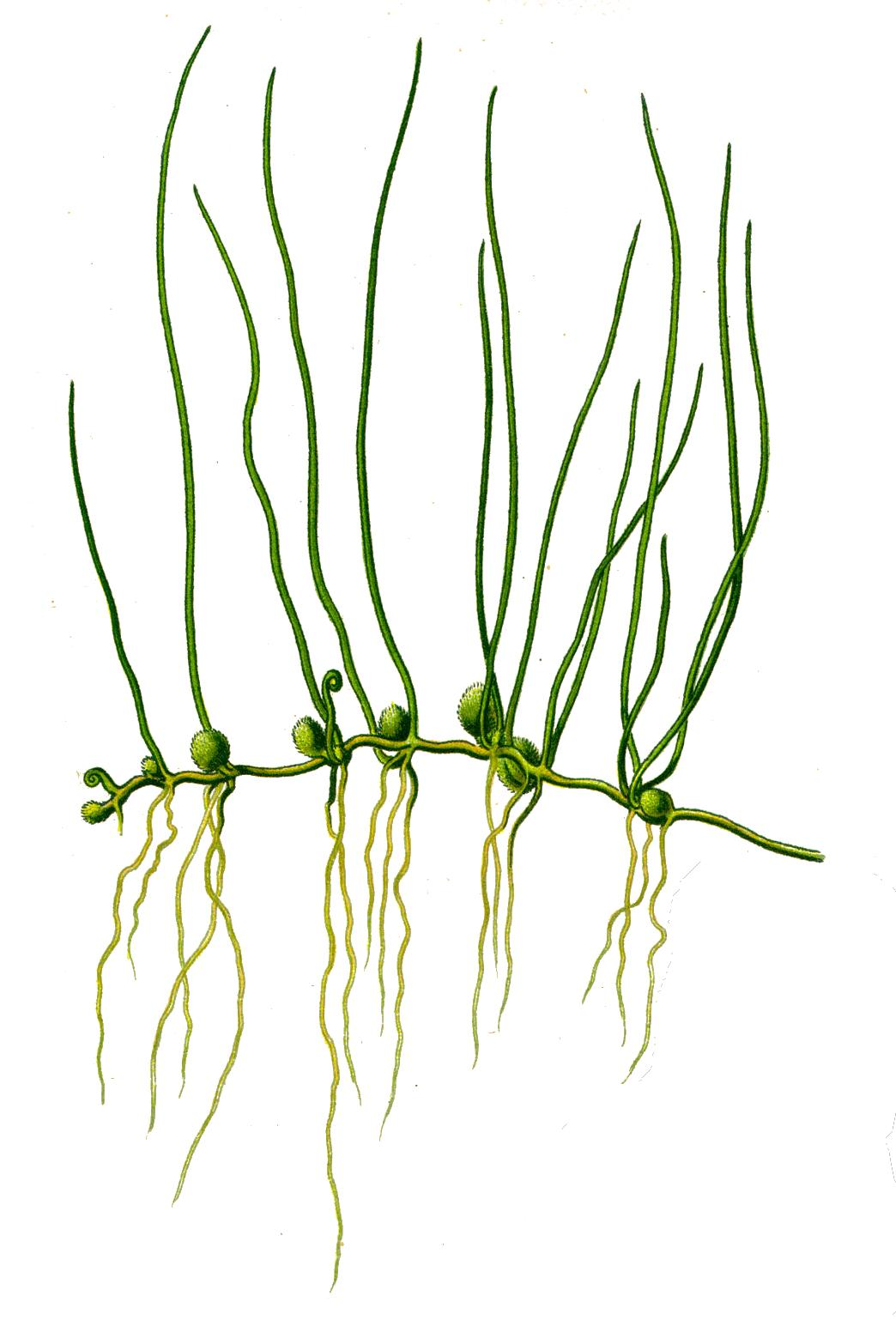
- Pillwort, Pilularia globulifera

Scientific classification
- Kingdom: Plantae
- Clade: Tracheophytes
- Division: Polypodiophyta
- Class: Polypodiopsida
- Order: Salviniales
- Family: Marsileaceae
- Genus: Pilularia; L.

Type species
- Pilularia globulifera L.

Species
- See text

Synonyms
- Calamistrum von Linné ex Kuntze 1891

= Pilularia =

Genus of ferns

Pilularia or pillworts is a genus of unusual ferns of family Marsileaceae distributed in North Temperate regions, Ethiopian mountains, and the southern hemisphere in Australia, New Zealand, and western South America.

Depending on the taxonomic revisor, the genus contains between 3 and 6 species of small plants with thread-like leaves, and creeping rhizomes. The sporangia are borne in spherical sporocarps ("pills") which form in the axils of leaves. Pilularia minuta from SW Europe is one of the smallest of all ferns.

== Phylogeny ==
Recent work from Pryer Lab accepted four species of Pilularia, with a fifth, P. novae-zealandiae, being conspecific with P. novae-hollandiae. In addition, another species, P. dracomontana, has been described from South Africa.

Phylogeny of Pilularia

- Pilularia
  - P. minuta Durieu (least pillwort)
  - - P. novae-hollandiae A.Braun (Austral pillwort)
    - - P. americana A.Braun (American pillwort)
      - P. globulifera L. (Common pillwort)

Other species include:
- P. bokkeveldensis Crouch 2012
- P. dracomontana N. R. Crouch & J. Wesley-Smith (Dragon-Mountain pillwort)
- P. ethiopica Eb.Fisch., Killmann, Mark.Ackermann & Yeshitela
