= Toyora Group =

- Stratigraphic range: Early-Late Jurassic; ~200–145 Ma
- Type: Geological group
- Sub-units: Higashinagano, Nishinakayama, Utano & Ohchi Formations
- Underlies: Renge Metamorphic Rocks & Toyohigashi Group
- Overlies: Toyonishi & Kanmon Groups
- Thickness: 1,000–2,000 m (3,300–6,600 ft)

Lithology
- Primary: Mudstone, sandstone
- Other: Siltstone, conglomerate, acidic tuff

Location
- Region: Yamaguchi
- Country: Japan

Type section
- Named for: Toyora Gun (Counties)
- Named by: Yabe
- Year defined: 1920

The Toyora Group is one of the Mesozoic strata in Japan, and was originally named Toyoura Series (or Formation) by Hisakatsu Yabe in 1920. The present name was defined by Tatsuro Matsumoto in 1949.

It is the Lower-Upper Jurassic sediments in the East Asian continental margin that distributes in the eastern part of the Shimonoseki, Yamaguchi Prefecture, southwest Japan. The distribution of the Toyora Group extends north and south, and has been separated between north and south districts by the Tabe Basin and the Kikugawa Fault that is an active left-lateral strike-slip fault.

== Geology ==
The Toyora Group is 1,000 to 2,000 metres (3,300 to 6,600 ft) thick, and divided into the Higashinagano, Nishinakayama, Utano, and Ohchi Formations in ascending order. The group rests unconformably on the tilted Paleozoic Renge Metamorphic Rocks and Toyohigashi Group, formations assigned to the Akiyoshi Belt. The Toyora Group is separated by a parallel or locally angular unconformity with the Latest Jurassic to Early Cretaceous Toyonishi Group.

The Toyora Group sediments are composed mainly of black mudstone, sandy mudstone, sandstone, conglomerate that deposited in a shallow marine embayment. The mudstone and very fine-grained sandstone beds are often bioturbated by an ichnogenus Phycosiphon.

== See also ==
- Toarcian turnover
- Toarcian formations
  - Fernie Formation, Alberta and British Columbia
  - Whiteaves Formation, British Columbia
  - Navajo Sandstone, Utah
  - Whitby Mudstone, England
  - Posidonia Shale, Lagerstätte in Germany
  - Ciechocinek Formation, Germany and Poland
  - Lava Formation, Lithuania
  - Marne di Monte Serrone, Italy
  - Calcare di Sogno
  - Toundoute Continental Series, North Africa
  - Los Molles Formation, Argentina
  - Mawson Formation, Antarctica
  - Kandreho Formation, Madagascar
  - Kota Formation, India
  - Cattamarra Coal Measures, Australia
