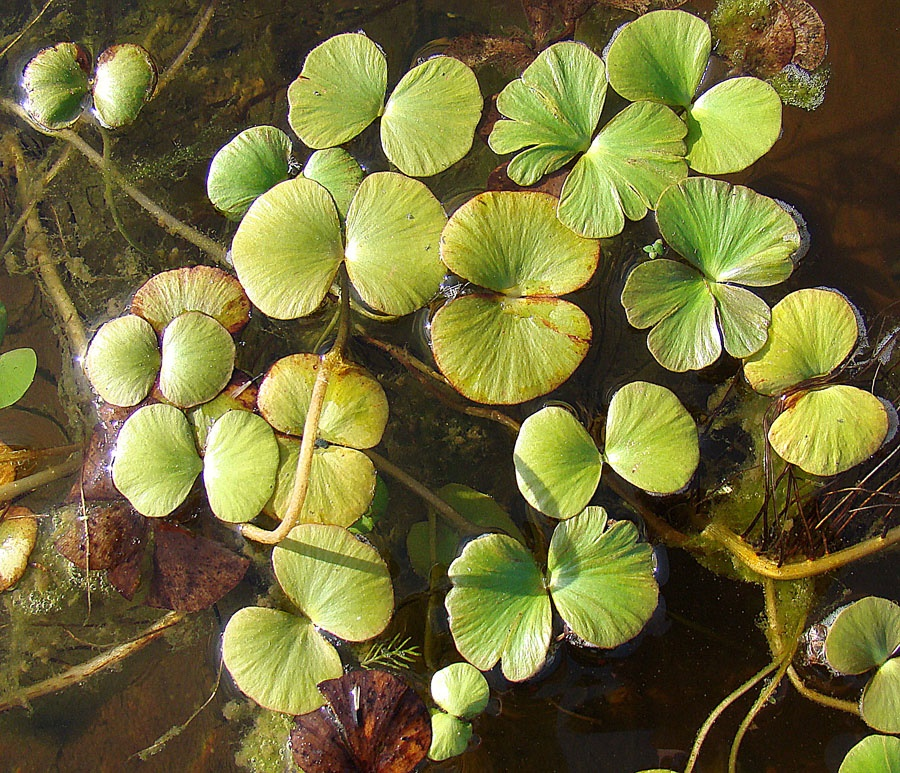

Scientific classification
- Kingdom: Plantae
- Clade: Tracheophytes
- Division: Polypodiophyta
- Class: Polypodiopsida
- Order: Salviniales
- Family: Marsileaceae
- Genus: Regnellidium; Lindm.

Type species
- Regnellidium diphyllum Lindm.

Species
- R. diphyllum Lindm.; †R. upatoiensis Lupiaet al.

= Regnellidium =

Genus and species of waterfern

Regnellidium is a monotypic genus of ferns of family Marsileaceae.

The single living species, Regnellidium diphyllum, the two-leaf waterfern, is native to southeastern Brazil and adjacent regions of Argentina. It resembles its relatives from the genus Marsilea, but has 2-lobed leaves (rather than 4). This fern is sometimes grown in aquaria.

A fossil assigned to the species Regnellidium upatoiensis has been found in Cretaceous deposits of the eastern United States.

The genus name of Regnellidium is in honour of Anders Fredrik Regnell (1807–1884), a Swedish physician and botanist. It was first described and published in Ark. Bot. Vol.3 (Issue 6) on page 2 in 1904.

== Other sources ==
- Mabberley, D. J. (1997). The Plant-Book. Cambridge University Press.
