= Rodeites =

Rodeites Temporal range: Paleogene-Neogene

Scientific classification
- Kingdom: Plantae
- Clade: Tracheophytes
- Division: Polypodiophyta
- Class: Polypodiopsida
- Order: Salviniales
- Family: Marsileaceae
- Genus: †Rodeites; Sahni
- Species: †R. dakshinii

Binomial name
- †Rodeites dakshinii Sahni

Extinct genus of ferns

Rodeites dakshinii is a fossil belonging to the fern family Marsileaceae. The fossil consists of a preserved sporocarp containing spores, and was recovered from a Cenozoic chert of India.
