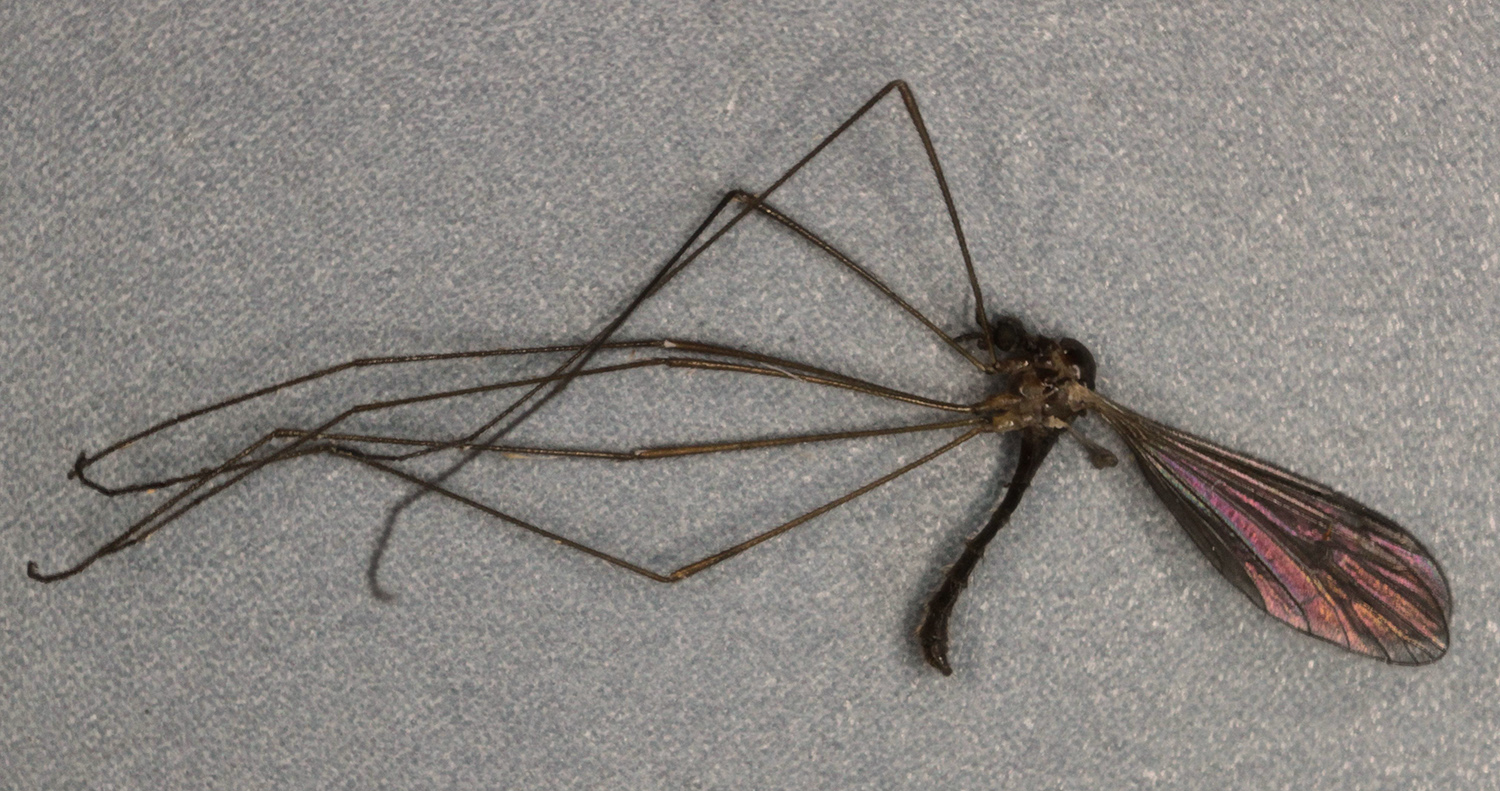
- Paradelphomyia senilis North Wales

Scientific classification
- Kingdom: Animalia
- Phylum: Arthropoda
- Class: Insecta
- Order: Diptera
- Family: Limoniidae
- Genus: Paradelphomyia
- Species: P. senilis

Binomial name
- Paradelphomyia senilis (Haliday, 1833)

= Paradelphomyia senilis =

Species of fly

Paradelphomyia senilis is a species of fly in the family Limoniidae. It is found in the Palearctic.

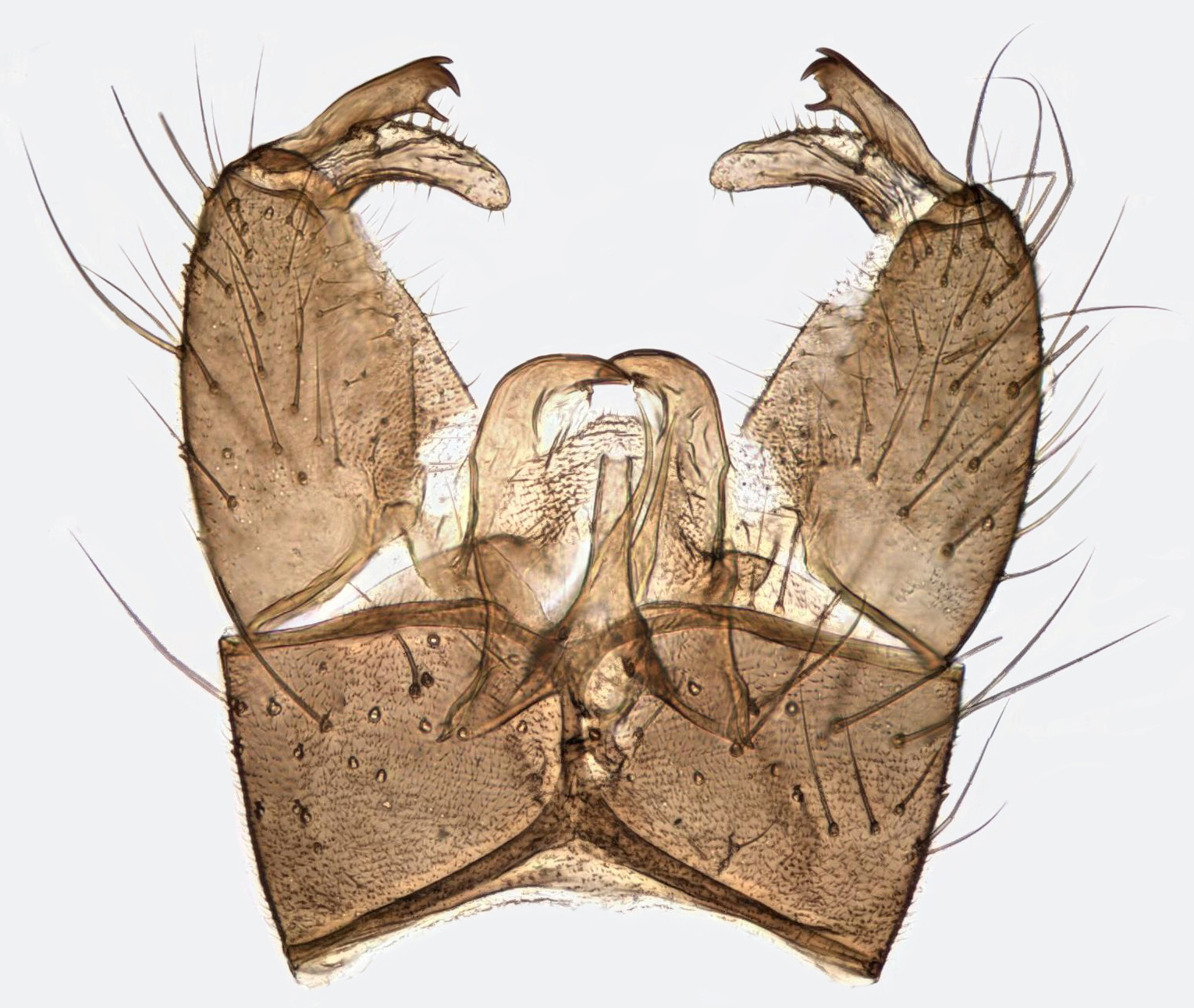
Male genitalia

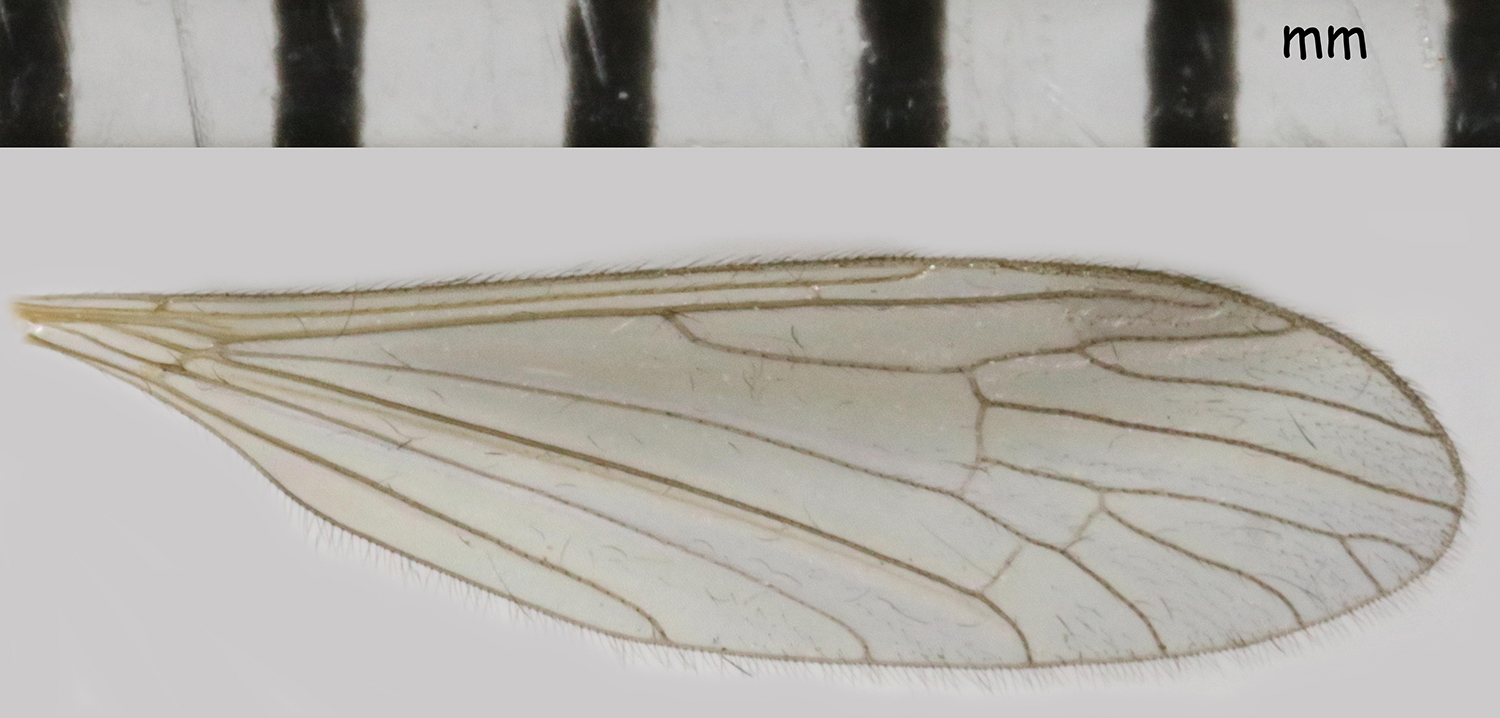
Wing
