= Paradelphomyia americana =

Scientific classification
- Domain: Eukaryota
- Kingdom: Animalia
- Phylum: Arthropoda
- Class: Insecta
- Order: Diptera
- Family: Limoniidae
- Genus: Paradelphomyia
- Species: P. americana

Binomial name
- Paradelphomyia americana Alexander, 1913

Synonyms
- Toxorhina americana

Species of fly

Paradelphomyia americana is a crane fly in the family Limoniidae found in Central and South America. It was previously included in the genus Toxorhina but has been reclassified.
