= Toyonishi Group =

Geologic rock strata in Japan

- Stratigraphic range: Tithonian to Lower Hauterivian
- Type: Group
- Sub-units: Kiyosue Formation, Yoshimo Formation
- Underlies: Toyora Group
- Overlies: Kanmon Group
- Thickness: 300–900 metres (980–2,950 ft)

Lithology
- Primary: Mudstone, Sandstone
- Other: Siltstone, conglomerate, limestone

Location
- Region: Shimonoseki City, Yamaguchi
- Country: Japan

Type section
- Named for: Toyonishi-son (Village)
- Named by: Matsumoto, 1949

The Toyonishi Group is a group of Mesozoic rock strata in Japan, and was originally named by Tatsuro Matsumoto in 1949. It distributes in the southern half of Shimonoseki City, Yamaguchi Prefecture, southwest Japan, and deposited during the Uppermost Jurassic-Lower Cretaceous along the East Asian continental margin.

== Geology ==
The Toyonishi Group is approximately 300–900 m thick, lies with a disconformity or a locally angular unconformity on the Jurassic Toyora Group, and is overlain with an unconformity by the Early Cretaceous Kanmon Group. It has been divided into the Kiyosue Formation and overlying Yoshimo formations, and exposes in the following three districts: Ohchi-Utsui-Kikugawa, Yoshimo, and Murotsu. The mountainous Ohchi(former Kiyosue) and west Yoshimo coastal areas are type areas of the Kiyosue Formation and the Yoshimo Formation, respectively.

Marine coral-bearing limestone was reported by Kenichi Yoshidomi and Yasuko Inoue from the stratigraphically lower level of the Yoshimo Formation containing a brackish water fauna in the Murotsu district that is located to the north of the Yoshimo coast, and it was ascertained that this limestone-bearing unit was stratigraphically located between the Kiyosue Formation and the Yoshimo Formation. However, its stratigraphic division has not yet been clarified

The Toyonishi Group has been considered to Tithonian-Early Hauterivian in age. This estimate is mainly based on biostratigraphic correlations between a brackish water fauna of the Yoshimo Formation and coeval faunas in Japan. The sediments of the group begin with the basal part of the Kiyosue Formation that is characterized by a thick fluvial sandstone-conglomerate bed. The main part of the Kiyosue Formation is composed mainly of deltaic mudstone, sandy mudstone, sandstone and conglomerate and the Yoshimo Formation consists of quartz sandstone and mudstone deposited in a delta and barrier-island complex.

== Fossils ==
The main part of the Kiyosue Formation frequently yields plant macrofossils. This plant fossil assemblage is called the Kiyosue flora, which includes both Ryoseki type and Tetori type taxa. The Yoshimo Formation yields many brackish water bivalves and gastropods that is called the Yoshimo fauna, which is correlated with the Ryoseki fauna in the outer zone of Southwest Japan.
