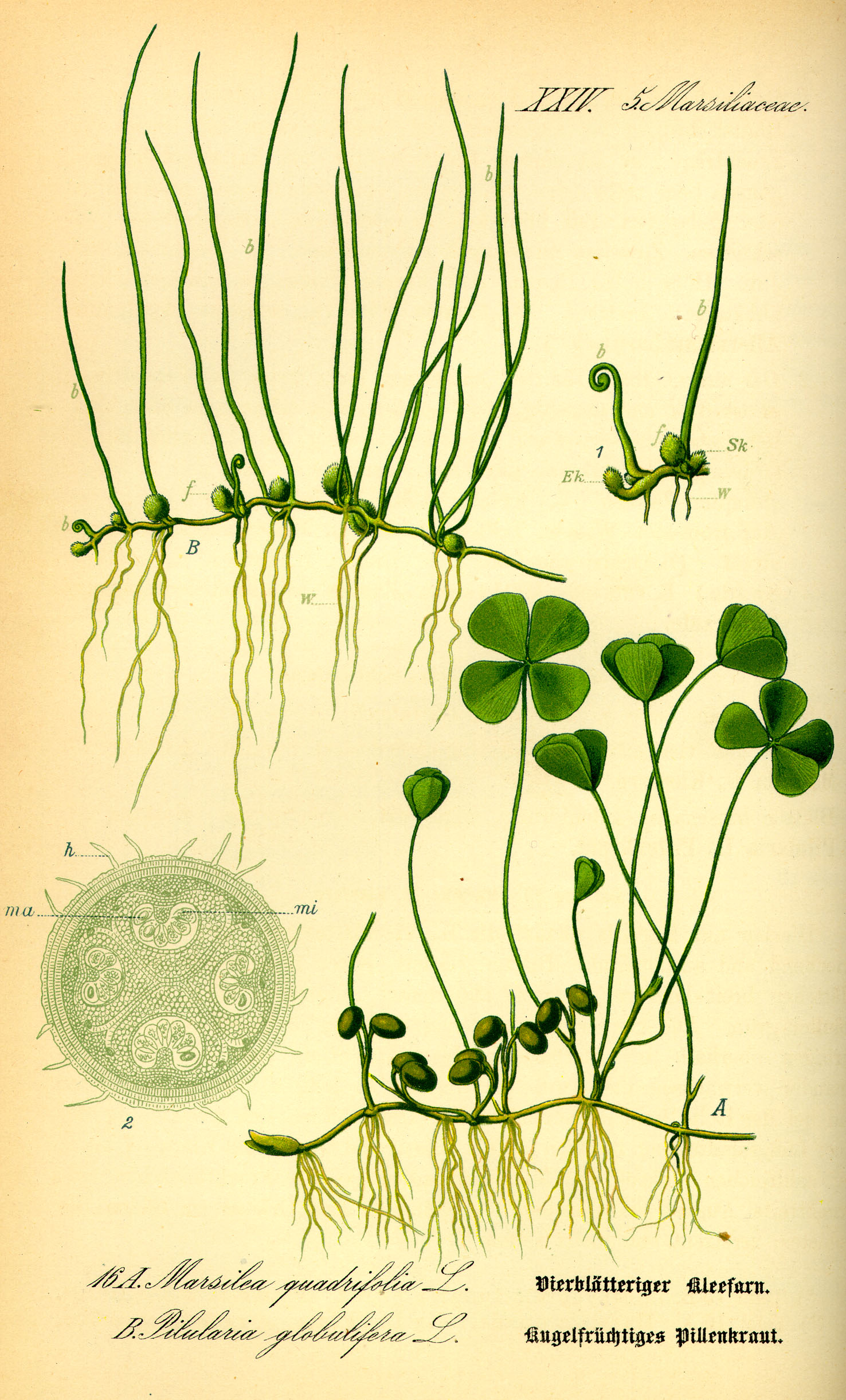
- Pilularia (top) and Marsilea (bottom)

Scientific classification
- Kingdom: Plantae
- Clade: Tracheophytes
- Division: Polypodiophyta
- Class: Polypodiopsida
- Order: Salviniales
- Family: Marsileaceae; Mirb.

Genera
- Marsilea L. (45 to 65 species); Pilularia L. (6 species); Regnellidium (1 species); Regnellites †; Rodeites †; Flabellariopteris †

= Marsileaceae =

Marsileaceae Temporal range: Late Triassic–Recent

Family of ferns

Marsileaceae is a small family of heterosporous aquatic and semi-aquatic ferns, though at first sight they do not physically resemble other ferns. The group is commonly known as the "pillwort family" after the genus Pilularia (pillwort), "pepperwort family" or as the "water-clover family" because the leaves of the genus Marsilea superficially resemble the leaves of a four-leaf clover. The family contains three genera; most of the species are in Marsilea. It is sister to the Salviniaceae, which is also aquatic and heterosporous. Fossils of the family are known as far back as the Triassic. The family is distinctive in producing its spores inside sporocarps, which are bean-shaped structures borne near the bases of the leaves. Some species of Marsilea are grown in garden pools or aquaria.

== Taxonomy ==
There are only three extant genera in the Marsileaceae. The majority of the species belong to the genus Marsilea, which grows worldwide in warm-temperate and tropical regions. Marsilea can be distinguished from the other two genera by the presence of four leaflets on each leaf, although some species occasionally produce six leaflets per leaf. A second genus Regnellidium includes a single living species that grows only in southern Brazil and neighboring parts of Argentina; it has only two leaflets per leaf. The third genus Pilularia grows widely in temperate regions of both the northern and southern hemispheres. Its leaves do not subdivide into leaflets but are slender and tapered to a point, so that it is often overlooked and mistaken for a grass. There are only about five species in Pilularia.

The cladogram shows the evolutionary relationships within the family, based on both morphological and RuBisCO sequence data.

- Polypodiophyta
  - all other ferns
  - Salviniales heterospory
    - Salviniaceae
      - Azolla
      - Salvinia
    - Marsileaceae
      - Marsilea
      - - Pilularia
        - Regnellidium

The closest relatives of the Marsileaceae are the Salviniaceae, which are also aquatic and heterosporous. The close relationship of the families is supported by both morphologic and molecular analysis, as well as by the discovery of a fossil, Hydropteris. In general, the Salviniaceae and Azollaceae have a much better fossil record than the Marsileaceae. Rodeites dakshinii is a preserved sporocarp containing spores, found in Tertiary chert of India. In 2000, fossilized sporocarps from the Cretaceous of eastern North America were discovered. These fossils were assigned to the species Regnellidium upatoiensis, and pushed the known history of the Marsileaceae back into the Mesozoic. Other remains include Regnellites nagashimae from the Upper Jurassic or Lower Cretaceous of Japan. The fossils include leaves with visible veins, as well as sporocarps. The currently oldest known member of the family is Flabellariopteris, described in 2014 from isolated leaves dating to the Late Triassic (237–201 mya) in Liaoning, China.

== Morphology ==
The Marsileaceae differ from most ferns in having long, slender rhizomes that creep along or beneath the ground, and in not having finely-divided pinnate leaves. Their fronds (leaves) grow in distinct clusters at nodes along the rhizome, with wide spacing between leaf clusters.

Roots grow primarily from the same nodes as the leaves, but may also grow from other places along the rhizome. The roots of Marsilea and Regnellidium contain vessel elements. These have evolved independently of vessels in other groups of plants.

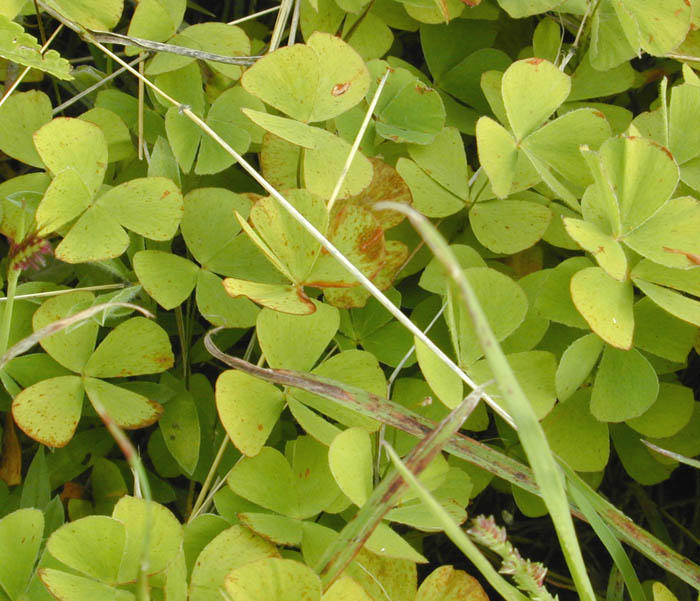
Leaves of the Hawaiian species Marsilea villosa

The leaves are the most easily observed characteristic for the Marsileaceae; they have a long slender leaf stalk ending in zero, two, or four (occasionally six) leaflets. The number of leaflets differs among the three genera and can therefore be used for identification. In Pilularia, the leaves are narrowly cylindrical and taper to a point. Leaves of Regnellidium bear two broad leaflets, while leaves of Marsilea bear four leaflets at the tip. The four leaflets on the leaf of Marsilea are not borne equally. Instead, they are borne in pairs with one pair of leaflets attached slightly higher than the other.

As with other ferns, the leaves develop in a circinate pattern, meaning that they unroll as they mature. At full maturity they are held erect with the leaflets unfolded, except in Pilularia whose leaves have no blade. Temperate species are deciduous, losing their vegetative leaves in winter.

Some aquatic species of Marsilea, especially those growing with their rhizome submerged, may have dimorphic vegetative leaves. Some of their leaves grow up to the surface of the water, and look just like leaves of species growing out of water. These plants also produce other leaves with shorter leaf stalks that are not long enough to reach the surface, and so the leaflets remain underwater. These leaves have different anatomical and cellular characteristics better suited to their submerged environment.

All species of Marsileaceae produce distinctively-shaped fertile (spore-producing) leaflets at or near the base of the fronds.

== Life cycle ==
Like other ferns, members of the Marsileaceae produce spores, but not seeds when they reproduce. Unlike other ferns, the spores in this family are produced inside sporocarps. These are hairy, short-stalked, bean-shaped structures usually 3 to 8 mm in diameter with a hardened outer covering. This outer covering is tough and resistant to drying out, allowing the spores inside to survive unfavorable conditions such as winter frost or summer desiccation. Despite this toughness, the sporocarps will open readily in water if conditions are favorable, and specimens have been successfully germinated after being stored for more than 130 years. Each growing season, only one sporocarp typically develops per node along the rhizome near the base of the other leaf-stalks, though in some species of Marsilea there may be two or occasionally as many as twenty. The resemblance of the sporocarps to peppercorns gives the family its common name of pepperwort.

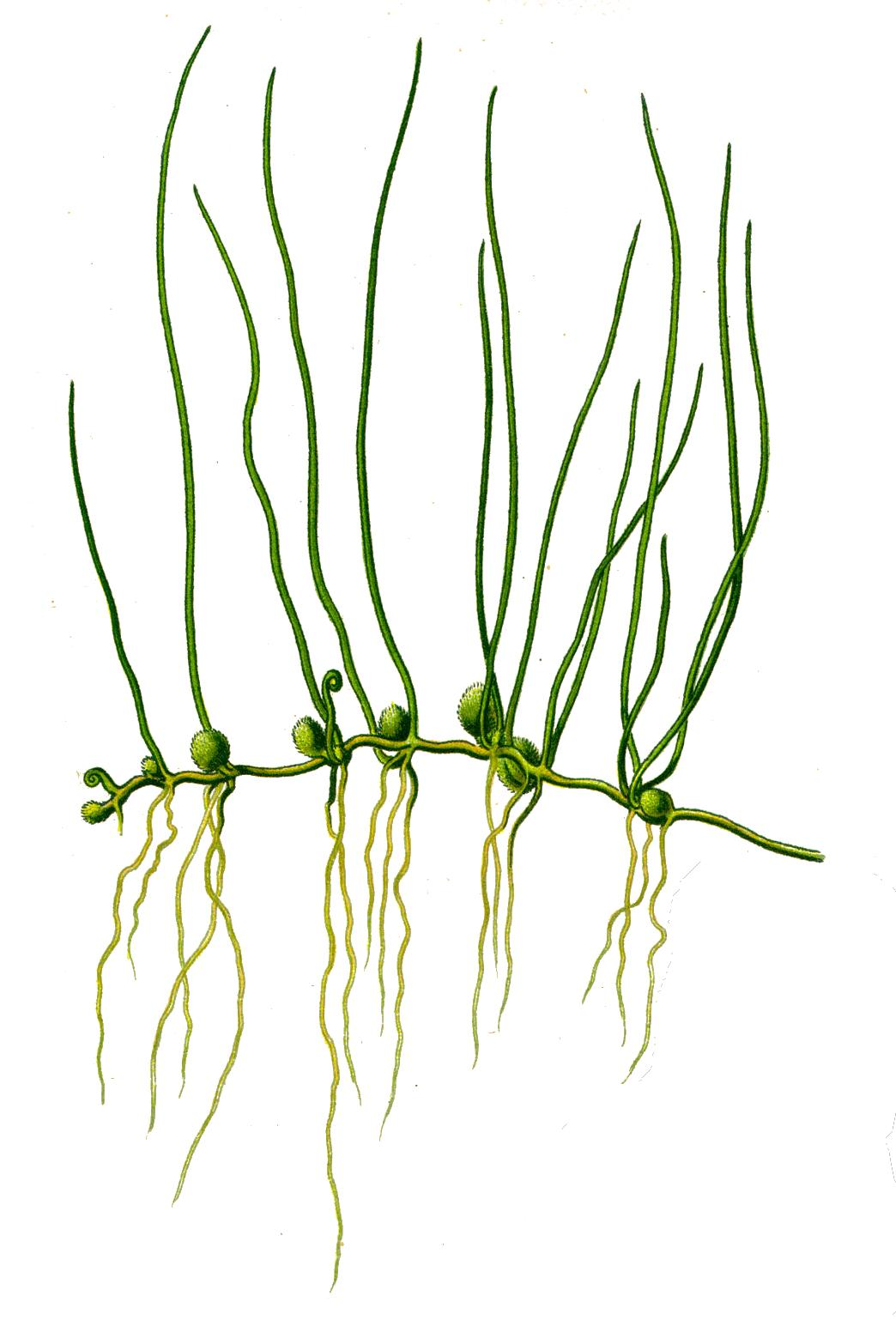
The European species Pilularia globulifera bearing sporocarps

The sporocarps are functionally and developmentally modified leaflets, although they have much shorter stalks than the vegetative leaflets. Inside the sporocarp, the modified leaflets bear several sori, each of which consists of several sporangia covered by a thin hood of tissue (the indusium). Each sorus includes a mix of two types of sporangium, each type producing only one of two kinds of spores. Toward the center of each sorus and developing first are the megasporangia, each of which will produce a single large female megaspore. Surrounding them at the edge of the sorus and developing later are the microsporangia, each of which will produce many small male microspores. Because the Marsileaceae produce two kinds of spore (and thus two kinds of gametophyte), they are called heterosporous. While heterospory is the norm among seed plants, it is rare in ferns (the only other fern family with it being the related Salviniaceae). The spores remain dormant inside the sporocarp through unfavorable conditions, but when conditions are suitable and wet, the sporocarp will germinate. It splits into halves, allowing the tissue coiled inside to become hydrated. As this internal tissue swells with water, it pushes the halves of the hard outer covering apart, and emerges as a long gelatinous worm-like sorophore. The sorophore is a sorus-bearing structure unique to the Marsileaceae; it may extend to more than ten times the length of the sporocarp inside which it was coiled. This extension carries the numerous spore-producing sori attached along each side of the sorophore out into the water.

== Ecology ==
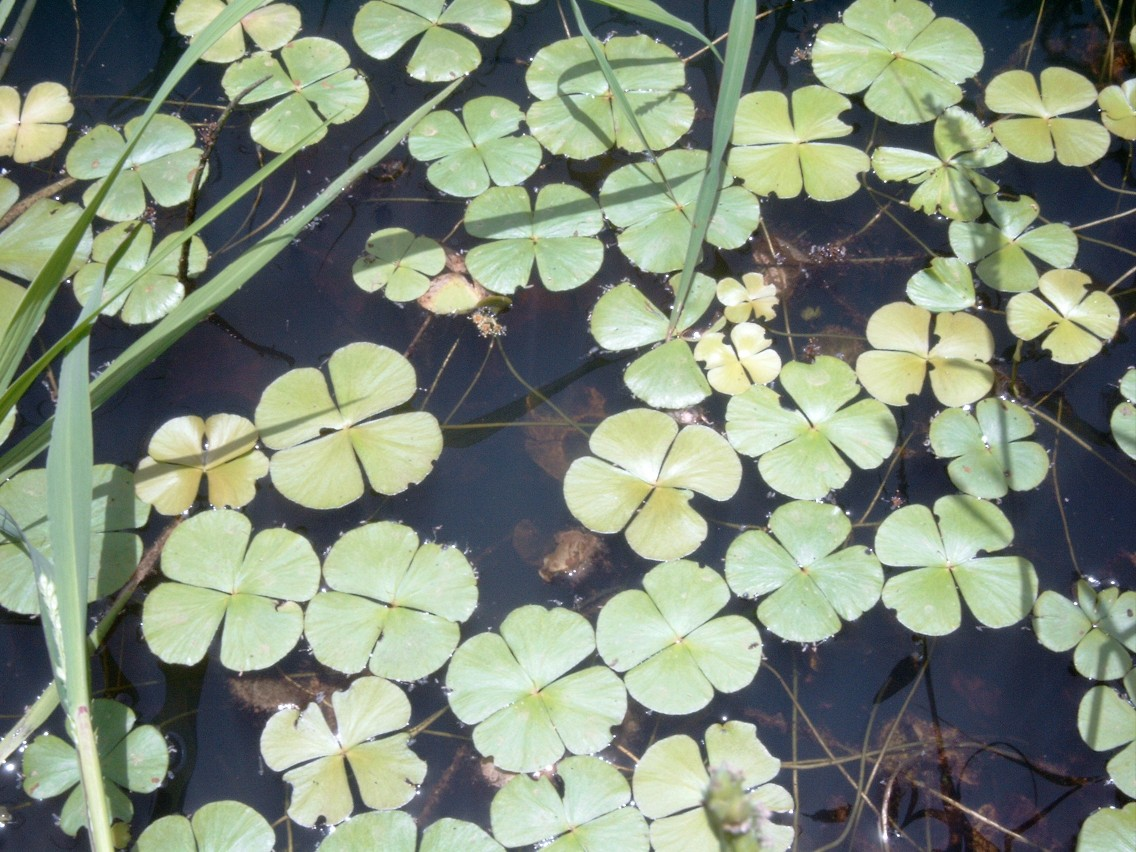
An African species of Marsilea with floating leaves

Members of the Marsileaceae are aquatic or semi-aquatic. Plants often grow in dense clumps in mud along the shores of ponds or streams, or they may grow submerged in shallow water with some of the leaves extending to float on the water surface. They grow in seasonally wet habitats, but survive the winter or dry season by losing their leaves and producing hard, desiccation-resistant reproductive structures.

== Human uses ==
Some species of Marsilea are cultivated in garden pools or aquaria. The Indigenous Australians once made a porridge of pulverized Marsilea sporocarps called nardoo. However, the sporocarps contain toxic levels of thiaminase, so careful preparation methods must be used in order for the nardoo to be safe for consumption.
