= Caldas, Minas Gerais =

Caldas
- Municipality
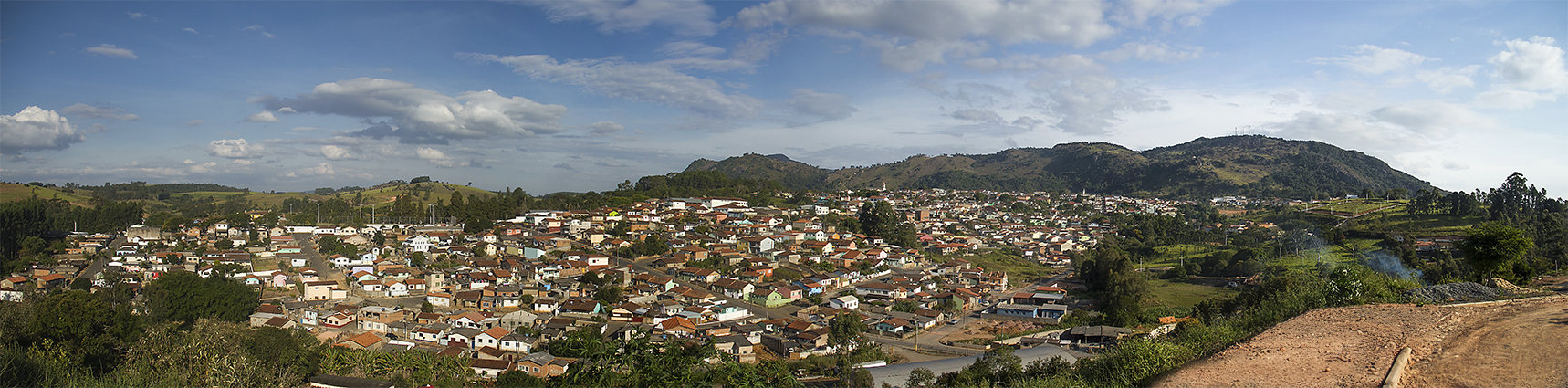

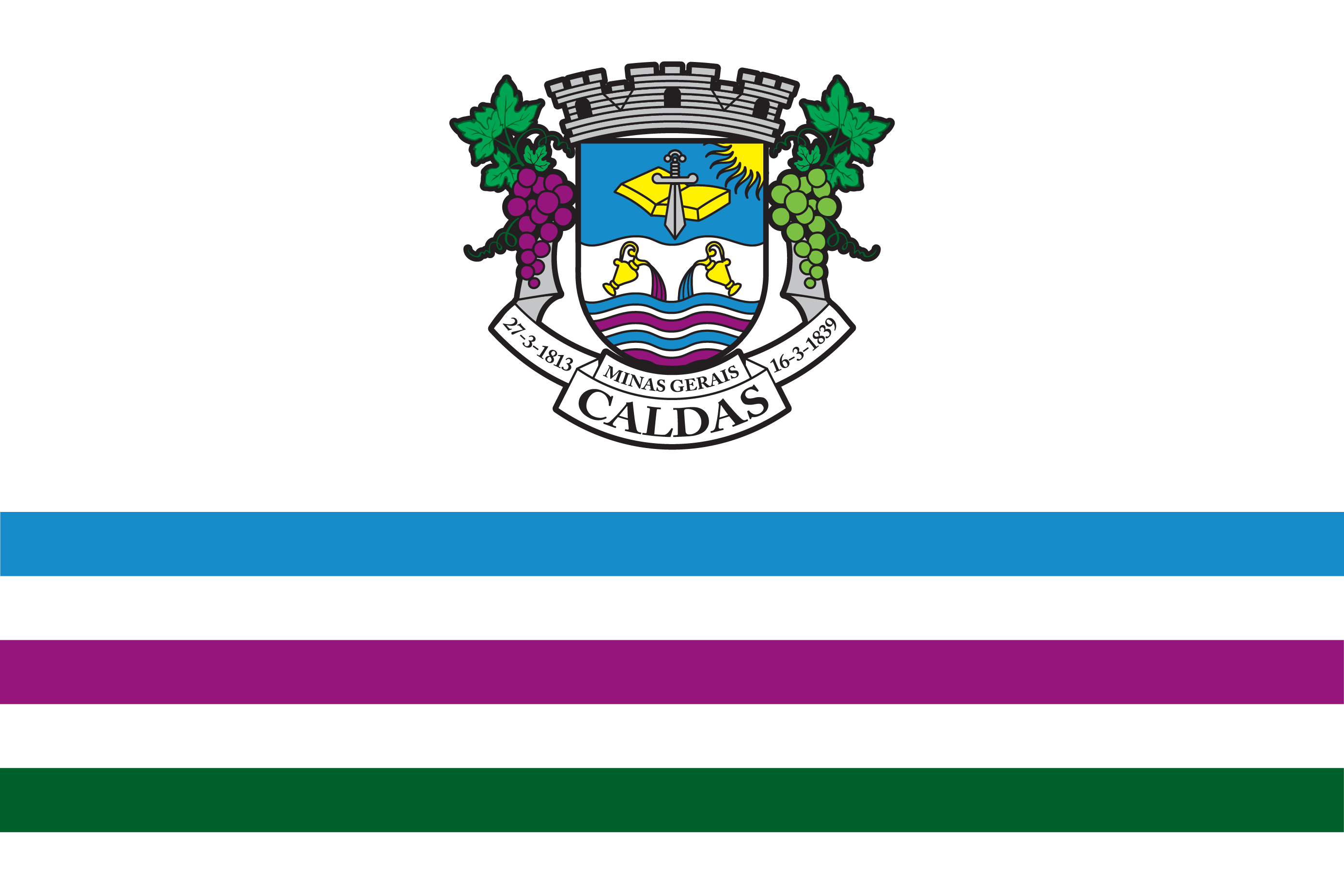
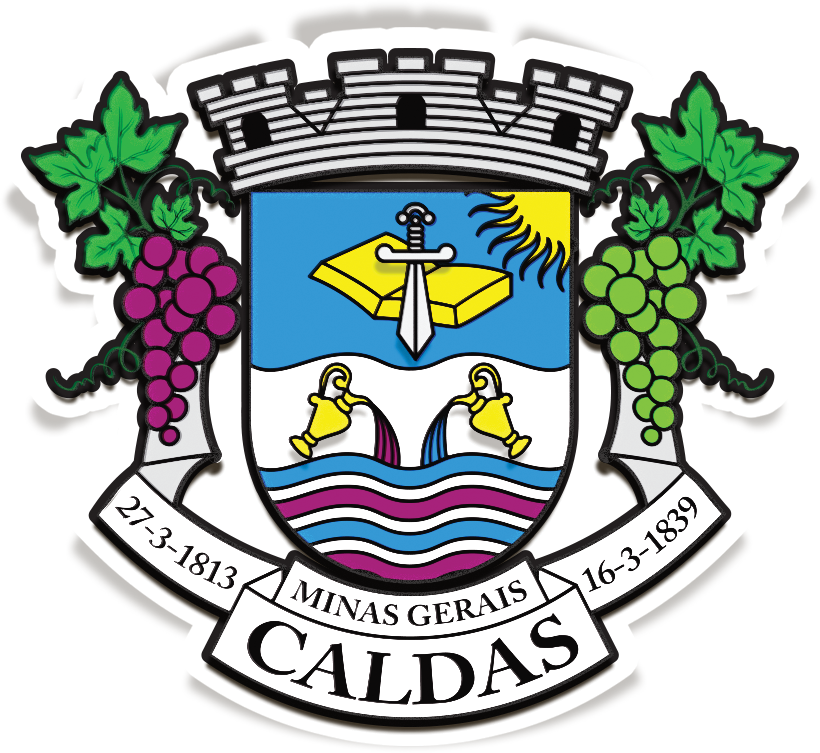
- Flag Coat of arms

- Location in Brazil
- Coordinates: 21°55′26″S 46°23′9″W
- Country: Brazil
- Region: Southeast
- State: Minas Gerais
- Mesoregion: Sudoeste de Minas
- Microregion: Poços de Caldas

Government
  - Mayor: Ulisses Guimarães Borges (PTB)

Population (2020)
  - Total: 14,541
- Time zone: UTC−3 (BRT)

Caldas is a municipality in the state of Minas Gerais in the Southeast region of Brazil.

== See also ==
- List of municipalities in Minas Gerais
