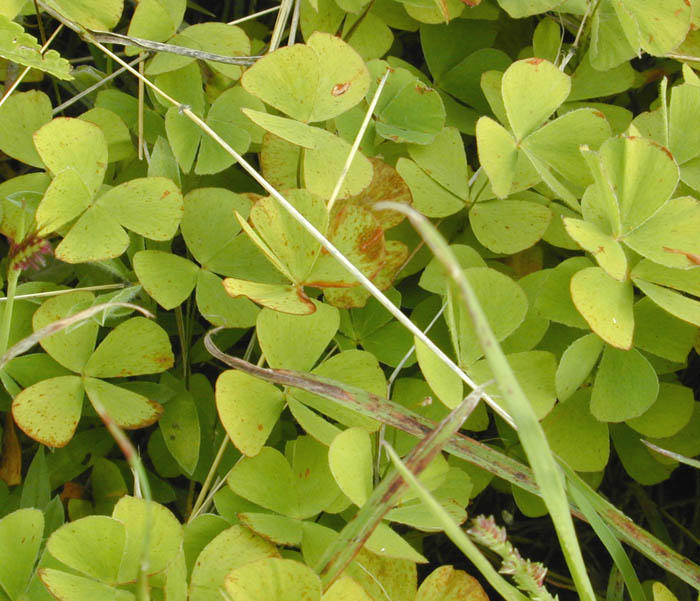
- Marsilea villosa

Scientific classification
- Kingdom: Plantae
- Clade: Tracheophytes
- Division: Polypodiophyta
- Class: Polypodiopsida
- Subclass: Polypodiidae
- Order: Salviniales; Link

Families
- Marsileaceae Mirb. in Lam. & Mirb. 1802; Salviniaceae Martinov 1820; †Hydropteridaceae

Synonyms
- "Hydropteridales"; Marsileales Bartl. in Mart. 1835; Pilulariales Bercht. & J.Presl 1820

= Salviniales =

Salviniales, the Waterferns

Order of aquatic and semi-aquatic ferns

Salviniales (commonly known as waterferns) are a widespread order of aquatic and semi-aquatic ferns.

== Description ==
Salviniales are all at least partially aquatic and differ from all other ferns in being heterosporous, meaning that they produce two different types of spore (megaspores and microspores) that develop into two different types of gametophyte (female and male gametophytes, respectively), and in that their gametophytes are endosporic, meaning that they never grow outside the spore wall and cannot become larger than the spores that produced them. The megasporangia each produce a single megaspore. In being heterosporus with endosporic gametophytes they are more similar to seed plants than to other ferns.

The fertile and sterile leaves are dimorphic, taking on a different shape, and leaves bear anastomosing veins. Aerenchyma is frequently present in roots, shoots, and petioles (leaf stalks).

The ferns of this order vary radically in form and many do not look particularly fern-like (especially members of the family Marsileaceae). Species of the family Salviniaceae are natant (floating), while those of Marsileaceae are rooted. However, the natant species may temporarily grow on wet mud during times of low water, and the Marsileaceae may grow as emergent species, depending on species and location.

The group has also the smallest known genomes of all ferns. One genus, Azolla, is amongst the fastest growing plants on earth and caused a cooling of the climate in the Azolla event about 50 million years ago.

There is a well-known fossil member of the Marsileales, Hydropteris, which is assigned to its own family (Hydropteridaceae).

== Classification ==
In the molecular phylogenetic classification of Smith et al. (2006), the Salviniales were placed in the leptosporangiate ferns, class Polypodiopsida. Two families, Marsileaceae and Salviniaceae, were recognized. The linear sequence of Christenhusz et al. (2011), intended for compatibility with the classification of Chase and Reveal (2009) which placed all land plants in Equisetopsida, reclassified Smith's Polypodiopsida as subclass Polypodiidae and placed the Salviniales there. The circumscription of the order and its families was not changed, and that circumscription and placement in Polypodiidae has subsequently been followed in the classifications of Christenhusz and Chase (2014) and PPG I (2016).

The likely phylogenic relationships between the 3 families and 11 genera of the Salviniales are shown in the following diagram.

- Salviniales
  - - †Hydropteridaceae
      †Hydropteris
    - Marsileaceae
      - †Arcellites
      - †Regnellites
      - †Molaspora
      - †Rodeites
      - †Flabellariopteris
      - - Marsilea
        - - Pilularia
          - Regnellidium
  - Salviniaceae
    - Azolla
    - Salvinia
