= Heterospory =

Production of spores of two different sizes and sexes by several groups of land plants

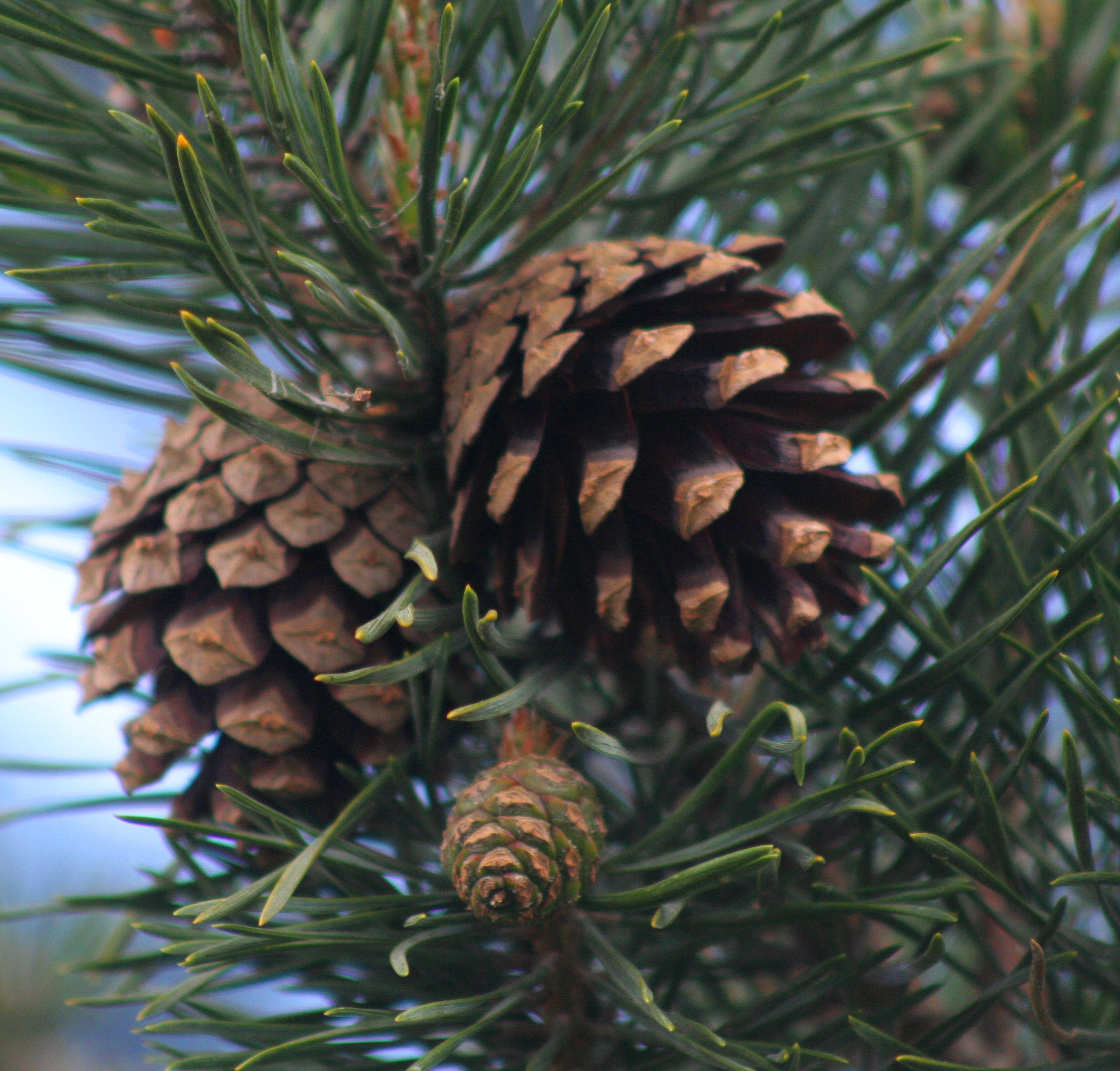
A female pinecone (Pinophyta) produces the megaspores of this heterosporic plant.

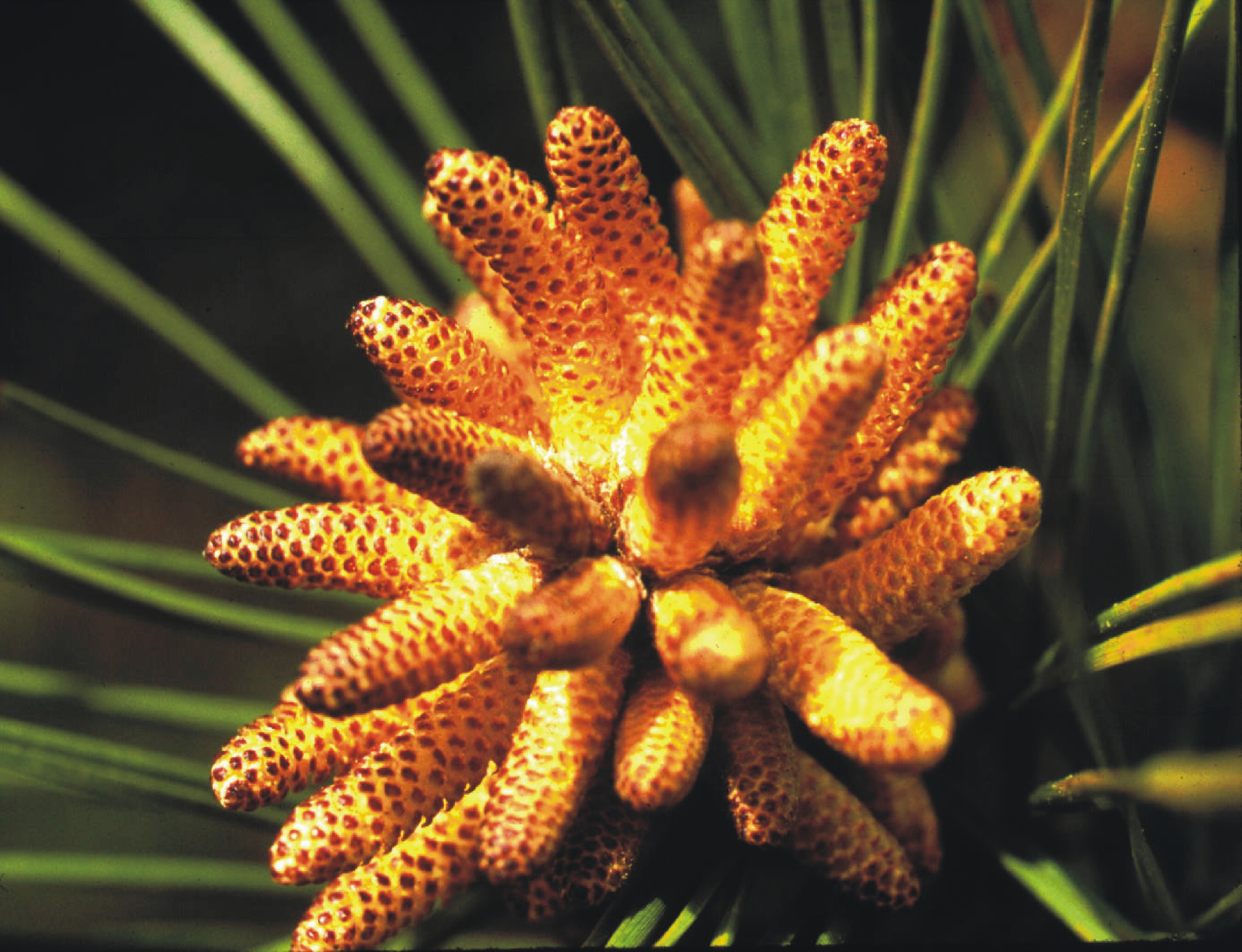
A male pinecone (Pinophyta) produces the microspores of this heterosporic plant.

Heterospory is the production of spores of two distinct sizes and sexes by the sporophytes of vascular plants (in bryophytes, spore dimorphism is referred to as anisospory). The smaller of these, the microspore, is male and the larger megaspore is female. Heterospory evolved during the Devonian period from isospory independently in several plant groups: the clubmosses, the ferns including the arborescent horsetails, and progymnosperms. This occurred as part of the process of evolution of the timing of sex differentiation. Four extant groups of plants are heterosporous; Selaginella, Isoetes, Salviniales and seed plants.

== Origin of heterospory ==
Heterospory evolved due to natural selection that favoured an increase in propagule size compared with the smaller spores of homosporous plants. Heterosporous plants produce two different sized spores in separate sporangia that develop into separate male and female gametophytes. It is proposed that the emergence of heterosporous plants started with the separation of sporangia, which allowed for the development of two different spore types; numerous small spores that are easily dispersed, and fewer, larger spores that contain adequate resources to support the developing seedling. During the Devonian period there were many species that utilized vertical growth to capture more sunlight. Heterospory and separate sporangia probably evolved in response to competition for light. Disruptive selection within species resulted in there being two separate sexes of gamete or even the whole plant. This may first have led to an increase in spore size and ultimately resulted in the species producing larger megaspores as well as smaller microspores.

Heterospory is advantageous in that having two different types of spores increases the likeliness that plants would successfully produce offspring. Heterosporous spores can respond independently to selection by ecological conditions in order to strengthen male and female reproductive function. Heterospory evolved from homospory many times, but the species in which it first appeared are now extinct. Heterospory is thought to have emerged in the Devonian period, mostly in wet/damp places based on fossil record evidence. In addition to being an outcome of competition for light, it is thought that heterospory was more successful in wetter areas because the megaspore could move more easily around in an aquatic environment while microspores were more easily dispersed by wind. Differing sized spores have been observed in many fossilized plant species. For example, the species Lepidophloios, also known as the scale tree, has been shown in fossils to have been heterosporous; The scale tree had separate cones containing either male or female spores on the same plant. Modern heterosporous plants exhibit endospory, in which a megagametophyte is fertilized by a microgametophyte all while still inside the spore wall, gaining nutrients from the inside of spore. Both heterospory and endospory seem to be one of the many precursors to seed plants and the ovary. Heterosporic plants that produce seeds are their most successful and widespread descendants. Seed plants constitute the largest subsection of heterosporic plants.

== Microspores and megaspores ==
Microspores are haploid spores that in endosporic species contain the male gametophyte, which is carried to the megaspores by wind, water currents or animal vectors. Microspores are not flagellated, and are therefore not capable of active movement. The morphology of the microspore consists of an outer double walled structures surrounding the dense cytoplasm and central nucleus.

Megaspores contain the female gametophytes in heterosporic plant species. They develop archegonia that produce egg cells that are fertilized by sperm of the male gametophyte originating from the microspore. This results in the formation of a fertilized diploid zygote, that develops into the sporophyte embryo. While heterosporous plants produce fewer megaspores, they are significantly larger than their male counterparts.

In Pteris platyzomopsis, described as an “incipient heterosporous” and the only extant exosporic species, the smaller spores germinate into free-living male gametophytes and the larger spores germinate into free-living female gametophytes, which may later also produce male reproductive organs. All other known extant heterosporous species are endosporic, with gametophytes of both sexes highly reduced and contained within the spore wall. The microspores of both exosporic and endosporic species are free-sporing, dispersed by wind, water, or animal vectors; however, in endosporic species the megaspores and the enclosed megagametophytes are retained and nurtured by the sporophyte phase. Endosporic species are thus dioecious, a condition that promotes outcrossing. Some exosporic species produce micro- and megaspores in the same sporangium, a condition known as homoangy, while in others the micro- and megaspores are produced in separate sporangia (heterangy). These may both be borne on the same monoecious sporophyte or on different sporophytes in dioicous species.

== Reproduction ==
Heterospory was a key event in the evolution of both fossil and surviving plants. The retention of megaspores and the dispersal of microspores allow for both dispersal and establishment reproductive strategies. This adaptive ability of heterospory increases reproductive success as any type of environment favors having these two strategies. Heterospory stops self-fertilization from occurring in a gametophyte, but does not stop two gametophytes that originated from the same sporophyte from mating. This specific type of self-fertilization is termed as sporophytic selfing, and in extant plants it occurs most commonly among angiosperms. While heterospory stops extreme inbreeding from occurring, it does not prevent inbreeding altogether as sporophytic selfing can still occur.

A complete model for the origin of heterospory, known as the Haig-Westoby model, establishes a connection between minimum spore size and successful reproduction of bisexual gametophytes. For the female function, as minimum spore size increases so does the chance for successful reproduction.
