= Coleophora latronella =

Scientific classification
- Kingdom: Animalia
- Phylum: Arthropoda
- Class: Insecta
- Order: Lepidoptera
- Family: Coleophoridae
- Genus: Coleophora
- Species: C. latronella

Binomial name
- Coleophora latronella McDunnough, 1940

Species of moth

Coleophora latronella is a moth of the family Coleophoridae. It is found in Canada, including Nova Scotia.

The larvae feed on the seeds of Juncus species. They create a trivalved, tubular silken case.
