= Meliboeithon =

Scientific classification
- Kingdom: Animalia
- Phylum: Arthropoda
- Class: Insecta
- Order: Coleoptera
- Suborder: Polyphaga
- Infraorder: Elateriformia
- Family: Buprestidae
- Genus: Meliboeithon; Obenberger, 1920

Genus of beetles

Meliboeithon is a genus of beetles in the family Buprestidae, the jewel beetles. They are native to Australia. There are six species.

These beetles are black or purplish in color. The adults are often found on the stems of rushes (Juncus spp.).

Species include:

- Meliboeithon bicostatus (Carter, 1928)
- Meliboeithon confusus Bellamy, 1988
- Meliboeithon crassus (Kerremans, 1898)
- Meliboeithon cylindricollis Bellamy, 1988
- Meliboeithon intermedius (Kerremans, 1898)
- Meliboeithon vitticeps (Carter, 1924)
