= Juncus triformis =

Conservation status
- Imperiled (NatureServe)

Scientific classification
- Kingdom: Plantae
- Clade: Tracheophytes
- Clade: Angiosperms
- Clade: Monocots
- Clade: Commelinids
- Order: Poales
- Family: Juncaceae
- Genus: Juncus
- Species: J. triformis

Binomial name
- Juncus triformis Engelm.

Species of grass

Juncus triformis is an uncommon species of rush known by the common names Yosemite dwarf rush and long-styled dwarf rush.

It is endemic to California, where it grows in wet granite rock habitat covered in thin soil layers, such as vernal pools and seeps. It is known from the Sierra Nevada, Central Valley, southern Cascade Range, and locations in the eastern Transverse Ranges and the Peninsular Ranges in Southern California.

Description

Juncus triformis is a small annual herb forming dense clumps of hair-thin red stems up to about 16 centimeters high.

The inflorescence is made up of one to eight tiny flowers atop each stem. The flowers have a few greenish to bright red segments no more than 4 or 5 millimeters long.
