= Juncus bryoides =

Scientific classification
- Kingdom: Plantae
- Clade: Tracheophytes
- Clade: Angiosperms
- Clade: Monocots
- Clade: Commelinids
- Order: Poales
- Family: Juncaceae
- Genus: Juncus
- Species: J. bryoides

Binomial name
- Juncus bryoides F.J.Herm.

Species of grass

Juncus bryoides is a species of rush known by the common names moss rush and mosslike dwarf rush. It is native to western North America from Oregon to Baja California, where it grows in many types of wet, sandy habitat. It is a very tiny annual herb producing erect, hair-thin stems no more than about 2 centimeters tall. Atop the stem is one flower made up of a few reddish segments 1 to 3 millimeters long which curve around the developing fruit.
