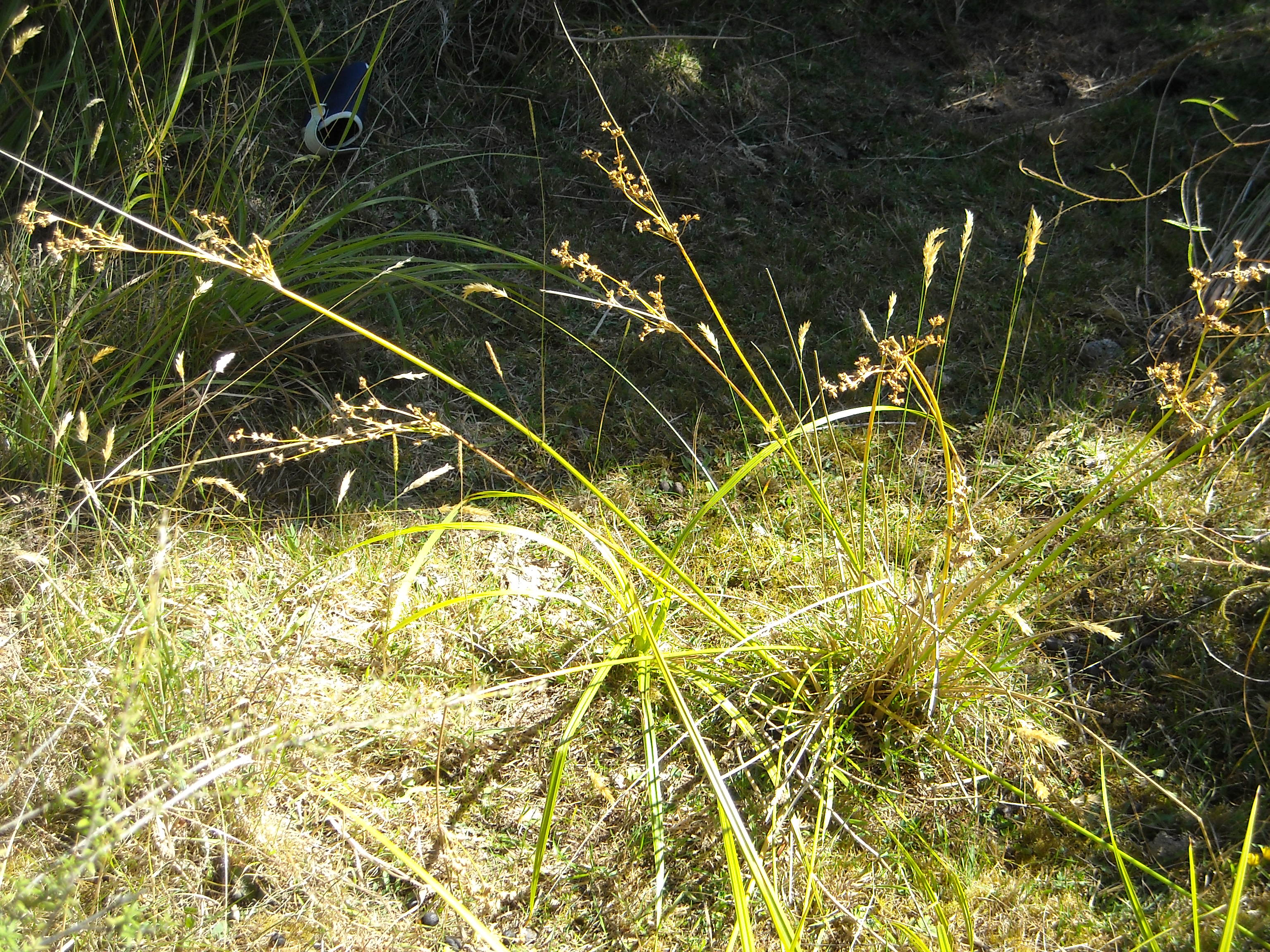

Scientific classification
- Kingdom: Plantae
- Clade: Tracheophytes
- Clade: Angiosperms
- Clade: Monocots
- Clade: Commelinids
- Order: Poales
- Family: Juncaceae
- Genus: Juncus
- Species: J. vaginatus

Binomial name
- Juncus vaginatus R.Br.

= Juncus vaginatus =

clustered rush

Species of rush

Juncus vaginatus, the clustered rush, is a species of flowering plant in the rush family, Juncaceae. A perennial plant growing from 60 cm to 1.7 metres high. Commonly found in south eastern Australia in moist situations. Flowering occurs in spring and summer. The specific epithet is derived from Latin, meaning "sheath". One of the many plants first published by Robert Brown with the type known as "(J.) v.v." Appearing in his Prodromus Florae Novae Hollandiae et Insulae Van Diemen in 1810.
