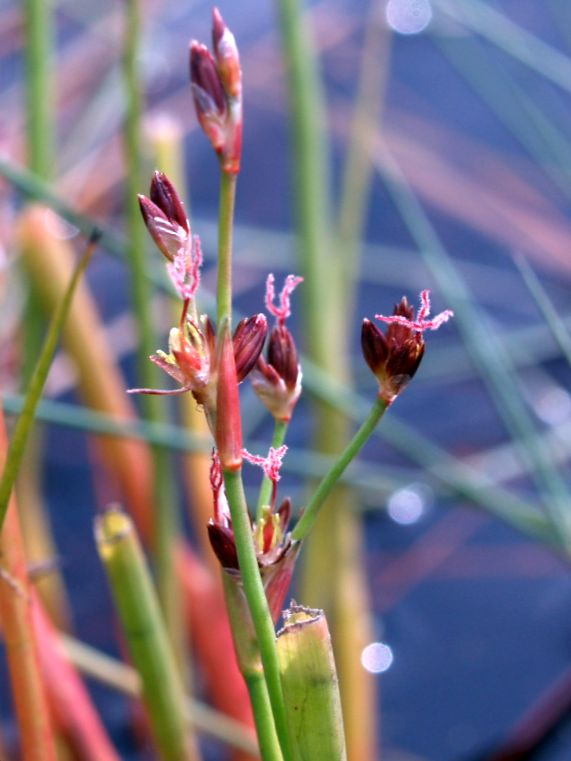

Conservation status
- Near Threatened (IUCN 3.1)

Scientific classification
- Kingdom: Plantae
- Clade: Tracheophytes
- Clade: Angiosperms
- Clade: Monocots
- Clade: Commelinids
- Order: Poales
- Family: Juncaceae
- Genus: Juncus
- Species: J. heterophyllus

Binomial name
- Juncus heterophyllus Dufour

= Juncus heterophyllus =

Species of grass

Juncus heterophyllus is an aquatic species of rush. It is native to the Mediterranean.
