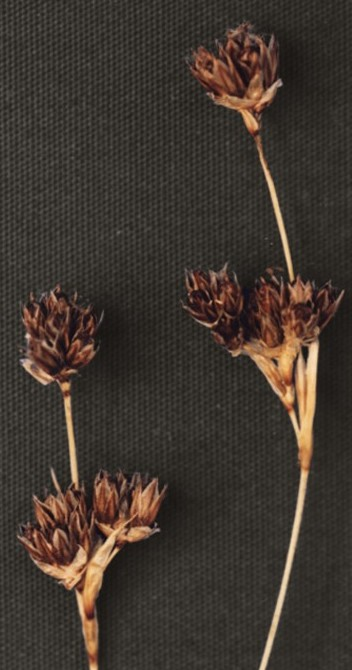

Scientific classification
- Kingdom: Plantae
- Clade: Tracheophytes
- Clade: Angiosperms
- Clade: Monocots
- Clade: Commelinids
- Order: Poales
- Family: Juncaceae
- Genus: Juncus
- Species: J. longistylis

Binomial name
- Juncus longistylis Torr.

= Juncus longistylis =

Species of grass

Juncus longistylis is a species of rush known by the common name longstyle rush. It is native to much of North America, including most of the United States and the southern Canadian provinces. It grows in moist terrestrial habitat, such as mountain meadows. It is a rhizomatous perennial herb forming clumps of slender stems up to about 60 centimeters tall. The inflorescence is made up of one to nine clusters of a few tiny flowers each. The flower is made up of several segments which are green with translucent margins.
