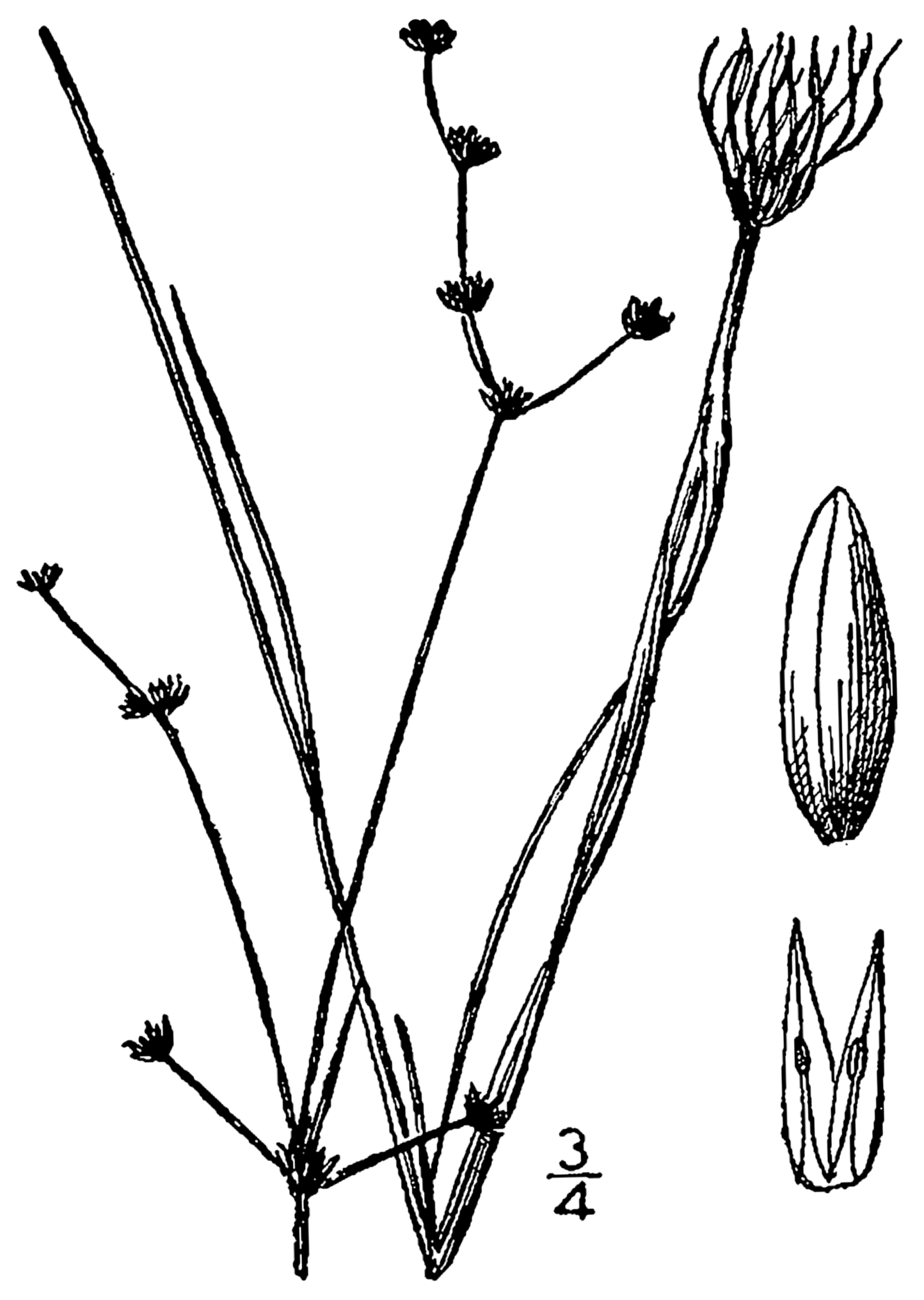

Scientific classification
- Kingdom: Plantae
- Clade: Tracheophytes
- Clade: Angiosperms
- Clade: Monocots
- Clade: Commelinids
- Order: Poales
- Family: Juncaceae
- Genus: Juncus
- Species: J. debilis

Binomial name
- Juncus debilis A.Gray

= Juncus debilis =

Species of grass

Juncus debilis, the weak rush, is a plant indigenous to the United States. It is listed as endangered in Massachusetts and New York, and as threatened in Rhode Island. It is listed as a species of special concern in Connecticut and believed extirpated in that state.
