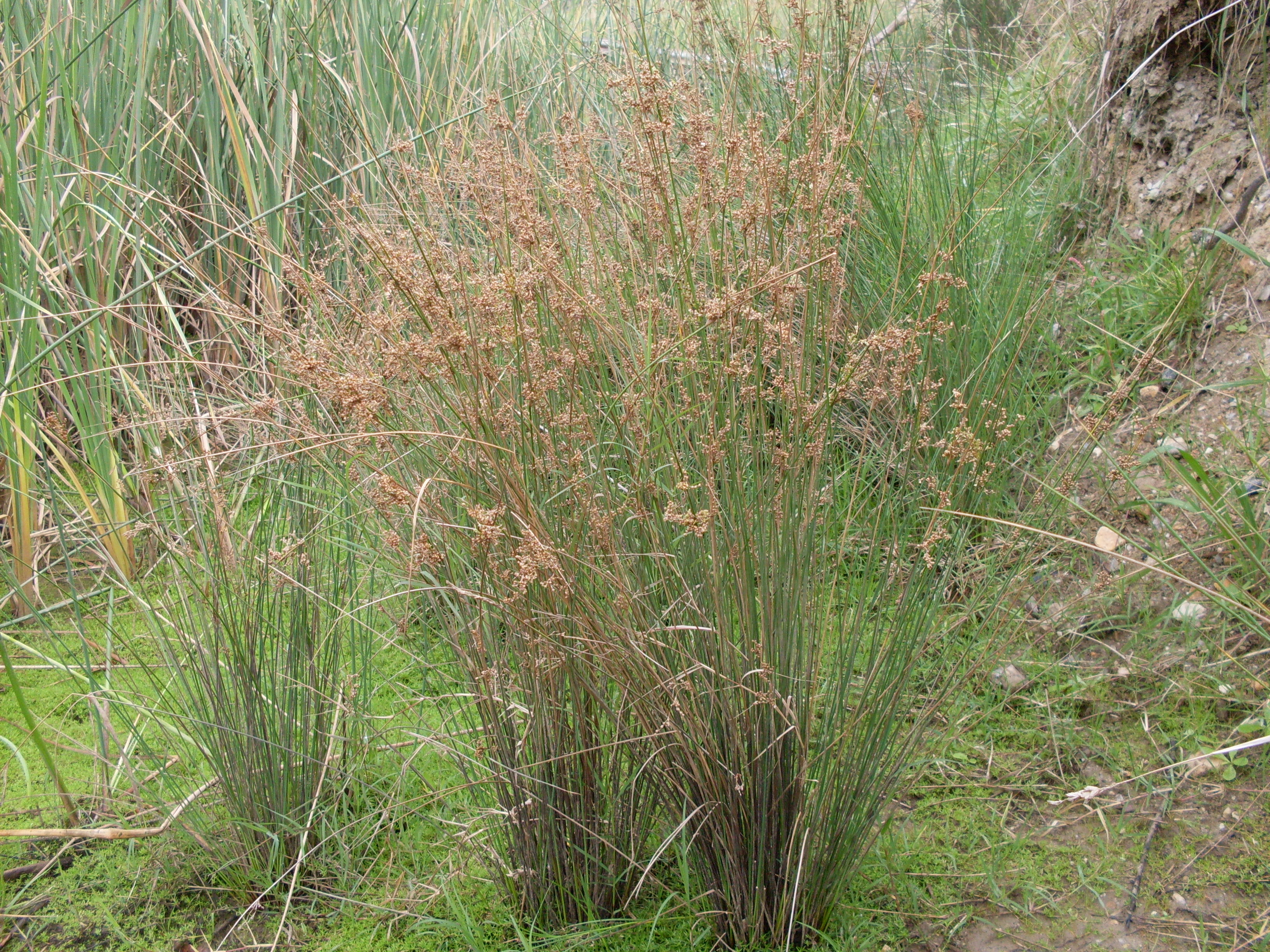

Scientific classification
- Kingdom: Plantae
- Clade: Tracheophytes
- Clade: Angiosperms
- Clade: Monocots
- Clade: Commelinids
- Order: Poales
- Family: Juncaceae
- Genus: Juncus
- Species: J. usitatus

Binomial name
- Juncus usitatus L.A.S.Johnson

= Juncus usitatus =

common rush

Species of rush

Juncus usitatus, the common rush, is a species of flowering plant in the rush family, Juncaceae. A graceful, clumping plant growing from 40 cm to 1.1 metres high. Indigenous to and commonly found in Aotearoa (New Zealand) and eastern Australia in disturbed sites by stream banks and other moist habitats. The specific epithet is derived from Latin, meaning "common or usual".
