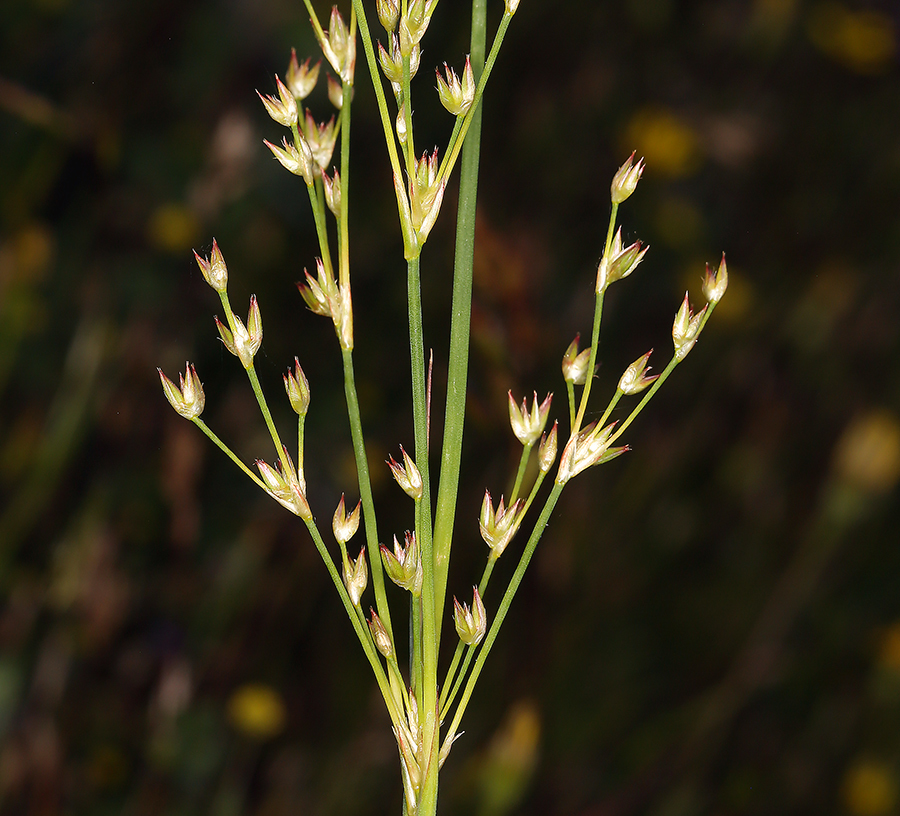

Scientific classification
- Kingdom: Plantae
- Clade: Tracheophytes
- Clade: Angiosperms
- Clade: Monocots
- Clade: Commelinids
- Order: Poales
- Family: Juncaceae
- Genus: Juncus
- Species: J. oxymeris

Binomial name
- Juncus oxymeris Engelm.

Synonyms
- Juncus acutiflorus Benth.

= Juncus oxymeris =

Species of grass

Juncus oxymeris, common name pointed rush is a species of rush native to the West Coast of North America (British Columbia, Washington, Oregon and California). It occurs in moist areas such as lakeshores, riverbanks, and moist meadows at elevations of 100–2,000 m (330–6,560 ft).

Juncus oxymeris is a perennial herb up to 60 cm (2.0 ft) in height, spreading by underground rhizomes. Leaves are gladiolate, i.e., flattened with one edge toward the stem, similar to those of Iris or Gladiolus. Flowers are straw-colored, with lanceolate tepals.
