= Juncus fascinatus =

Scientific classification
- Kingdom: Plantae
- Clade: Embryophytes
- Clade: Tracheophytes
- Clade: Spermatophytes
- Clade: Angiosperms
- Clade: Monocots
- Clade: Commelinids
- Order: Poales
- Family: Juncaceae
- Genus: Juncus
- Species: J. fascinatus

Binomial name
- Juncus fascinatus (M.C.Johnst.) W.M.Knapp

Synonyms
- Juncus crassifolius var. fascinatus (M.C.Johnst.) Waterf.; Juncus validus var. fascinatus M.C.Johnst.

Species of flowering plant

Juncus fascinatus is a species of flowering plant in the rush family Juncaceae, native to Texas. Its specific epithet refers to Enchanted Rock, where it was first collected.
