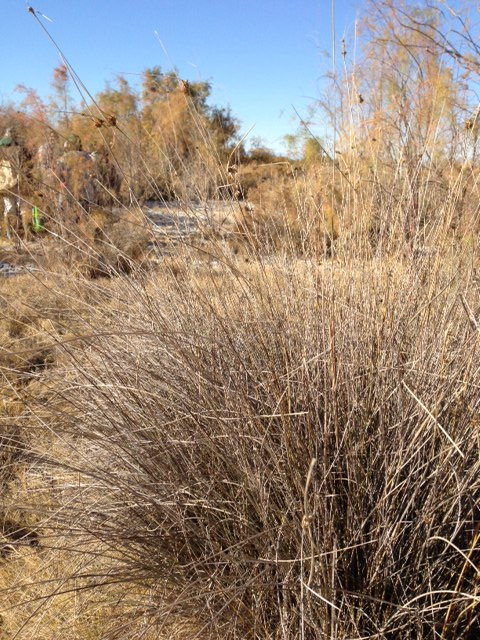

Scientific classification
- Kingdom: Plantae
- Clade: Tracheophytes
- Clade: Angiosperms
- Clade: Monocots
- Clade: Commelinids
- Order: Poales
- Family: Juncaceae
- Genus: Juncus
- Species: J. cooperi

Binomial name
- Juncus cooperi Engelm.

= Juncus cooperi =

Species of grass

Juncus cooperi is a species of rush known by the common name Cooper's rush. It is native to the deserts of the southwestern United States (namely in states such as California and Nevada) and northern Mexico, where it grows in alkaline and saline soils such as those around salt marshes and desert springs.

== Taxonomy ==
The species was first described by German-American botanist George Engelmann in 1868 under its current binomial name.

== Description ==
This is a perennial herb forming large clumps of erect stems up to about 80 centimetres tall from a thick rhizome and large root network. The bases of the stems are surrounded by sparse, small leaves, which are stiff and have sharp tips. The inflorescence is a cluster of brown, pale green, or straw-colored flowers accompanied by one bract which appears as an extension of the stem.
