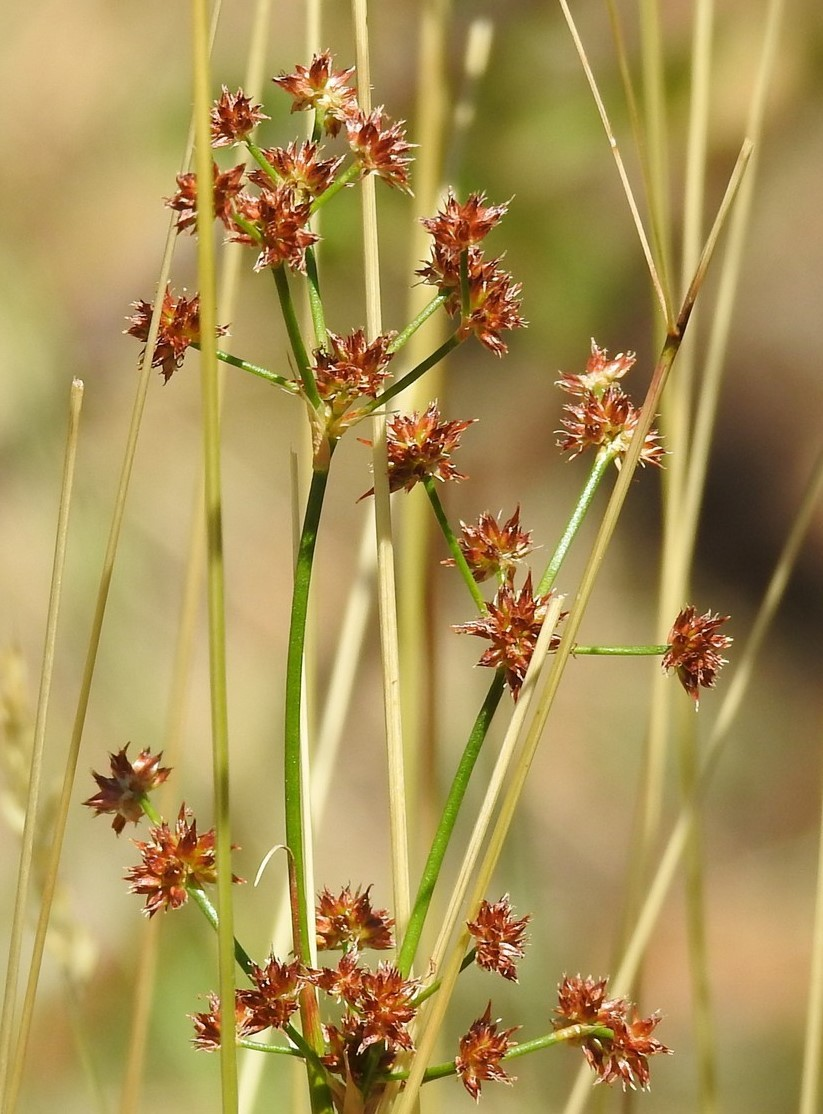

Scientific classification
- Kingdom: Plantae
- Clade: Tracheophytes
- Clade: Angiosperms
- Clade: Monocots
- Clade: Commelinids
- Order: Poales
- Family: Juncaceae
- Genus: Juncus
- Species: J. fontanesii

Binomial name
- Juncus fontanesii J.Gay ex Laharpe

= Juncus fontanesii =

Species of plant

Juncus fontanesii, also known as Desfontaines' rush, is a species of rush in the family Juncaceae.

== Description ==
Resembling a J. articulatus with sprawling stems, or for ssp. brachyanthus mat-forming.

Inflorescence is a lax display of spherical heads of flowers.

The leaves are tubular with inner cross divisions chambering the leaf into long sections very obvious when opened or dried; there are no lengthwise divisions.

The stems, as well as upright ones, sprawl on the ground and in the case of ssp. fontanesii these ground stems are conspicuously long (to 2 m) and frequent, for the others they are at most few, though there are underground rhizomes.

The fruit capsule is conspicuously longer than the 6 tepals and for ssp pyramidatus and ssp kotschyi is contracted at the top with a sizeable tip (like J. articulatus but clearly longer, 0.5-1(1.5) mm) whilst for ssp. fontanesii the fruit tip gradually tapers (1–2 mm).

The tepals are rather greenish with narrowly acutely pointed tips (not rounded), with the inner 3 tepals longer than the outer 3 (in contrast to J. articulatus where longer tepals are the outer). They are over 3mm (except ssp. brachyanthus).

ssp. kotschyi is small (8-15 (rarely 25) cm) with tepals with broad pale margins (ssp. pyramidalis very narrow pale margins).

Occasional intermediates between ssp. fontanesii and ssp. pyramidatus are found from Italy eastwards.

This is a Mediterranean/West-Asian species; outside that range there may be species resembling it.

== Distribution and habitat ==
- Species - Mediterranean countries and a little eastward.
- ssp. fontanesii - Mediterranean (Albania, Algeria, Baleares, France, Greece, Italy, Morocco, Portugal, Sardegna, Sicilia, Spain, Tunisia, Turkey, Turkey-in-Europe, Yugoslavia). Open wet soil, humid grasslands of tall grasses and rushes, margins of watercourses and temporarily inundated places, 0–1000 m.
- ssp. pyramidatus (Laharpe) Snogerup - Cyprus, Egypt, Greece, Iraq, Italy, Lebanon-Syria, Libya, Palestine, Saudi Arabia, Sicilia, Sinai, Tunisia, Turkey, Yemen. Wet places, margins of watercourses, temporarily wet grasslands, 0–1200 m but in desert areas to 2500 m.
- ssp. kotschyi (Boiss.) Snogerup - Afghanistan, Iran, Iraq, Lebanon-Syria, North Caucasus, Pakistan, Turkmenistan. Wet meadows near streams, ditches, mostly 1200–2500 m.
- ssp. brachyanthus Trab. - Algeria, Morocco. Mountain meadows, wet sites along streams, 1500–3000 m.
