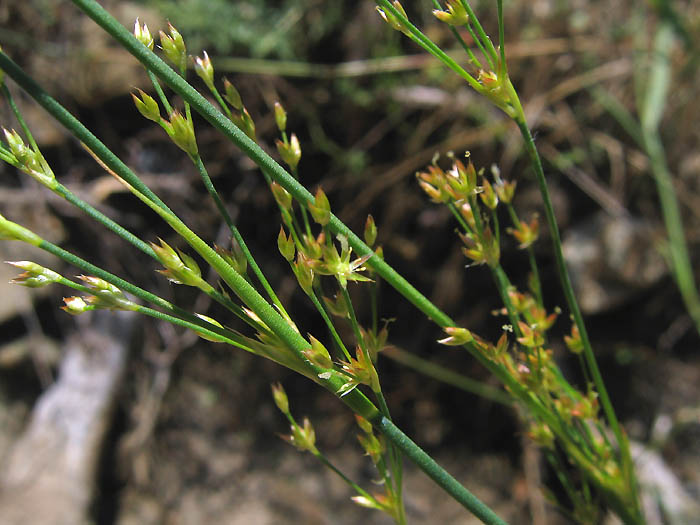

Scientific classification
- Kingdom: Plantae
- Clade: Tracheophytes
- Clade: Angiosperms
- Clade: Monocots
- Clade: Commelinids
- Order: Poales
- Family: Juncaceae
- Genus: Juncus
- Species: J. dubius

Binomial name
- Juncus dubius Engelm.

Synonyms
- Juncus rugulosus

= Juncus dubius =

Species of grass

Juncus dubius is a species of rush known by the common name wrinkled rush. It is endemic to California, in the California Coast Ranges, Transverse Ranges, and southern Sierra Nevada. It is a common member of the flora in many wet areas, such as marshes and riverbanks.

== Description ==
Juncus dubius is a perennial herb growing in thick tufts from a horizontal rhizome. The stem is erect and green and has a distinctive wrinkled, rippled surface. It reaches a maximum height near 70 centimeters. There are few leaves, those growing at the base lacking blades and appearing as sheaths around the stem, and those further up the stem having cylindrical blades.

The inflorescence is open, with spreading branches holding many small clusters of a few flowers each. There are small, clear bracts. Each flower has reddish or brownish green tepals with thin, transparent margins, and bristles at the tip. There are six stamens.

The fruit is a red or brown capsule which is larger than the flower in which it grows.
