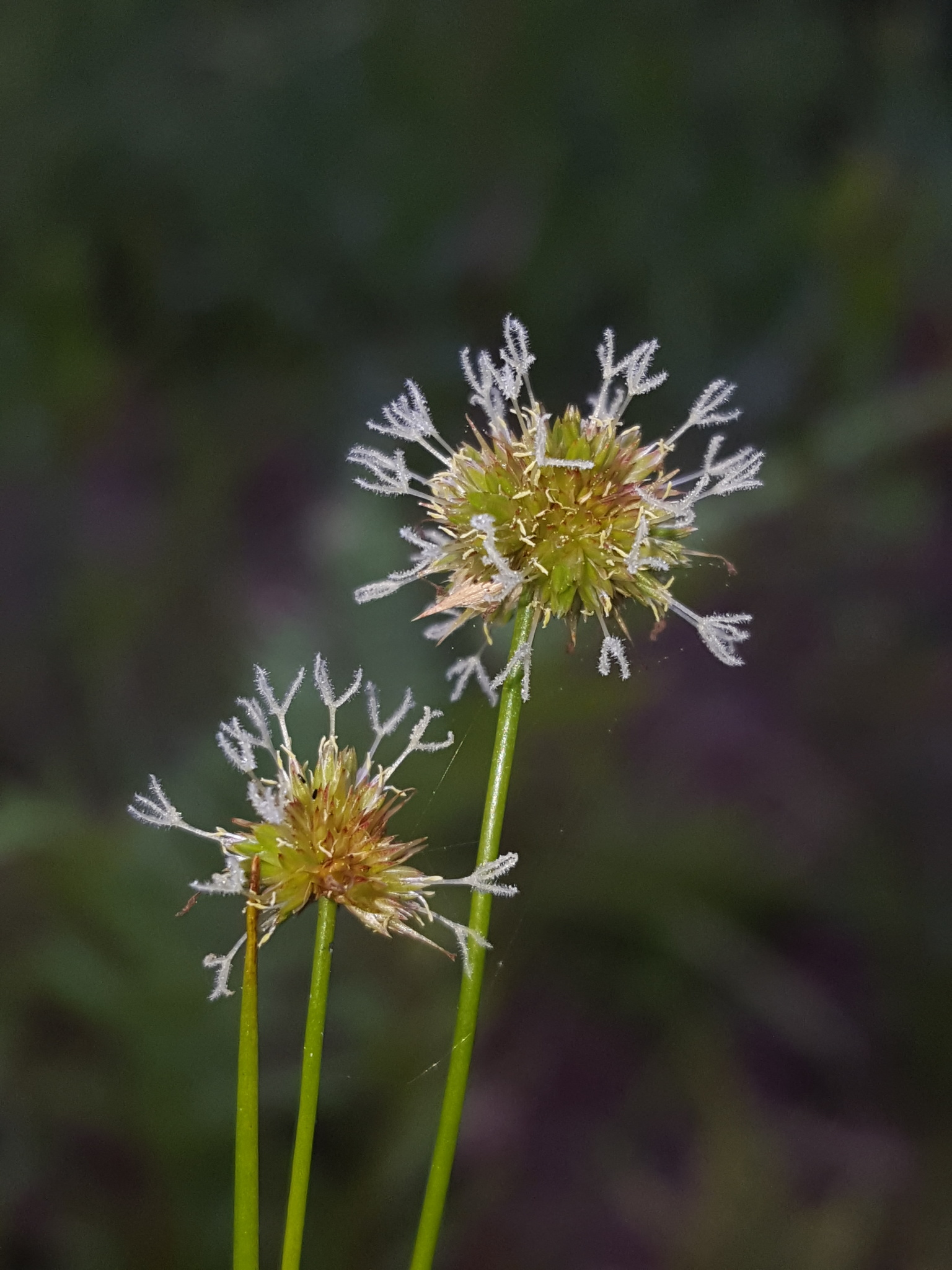
- Inflorescences
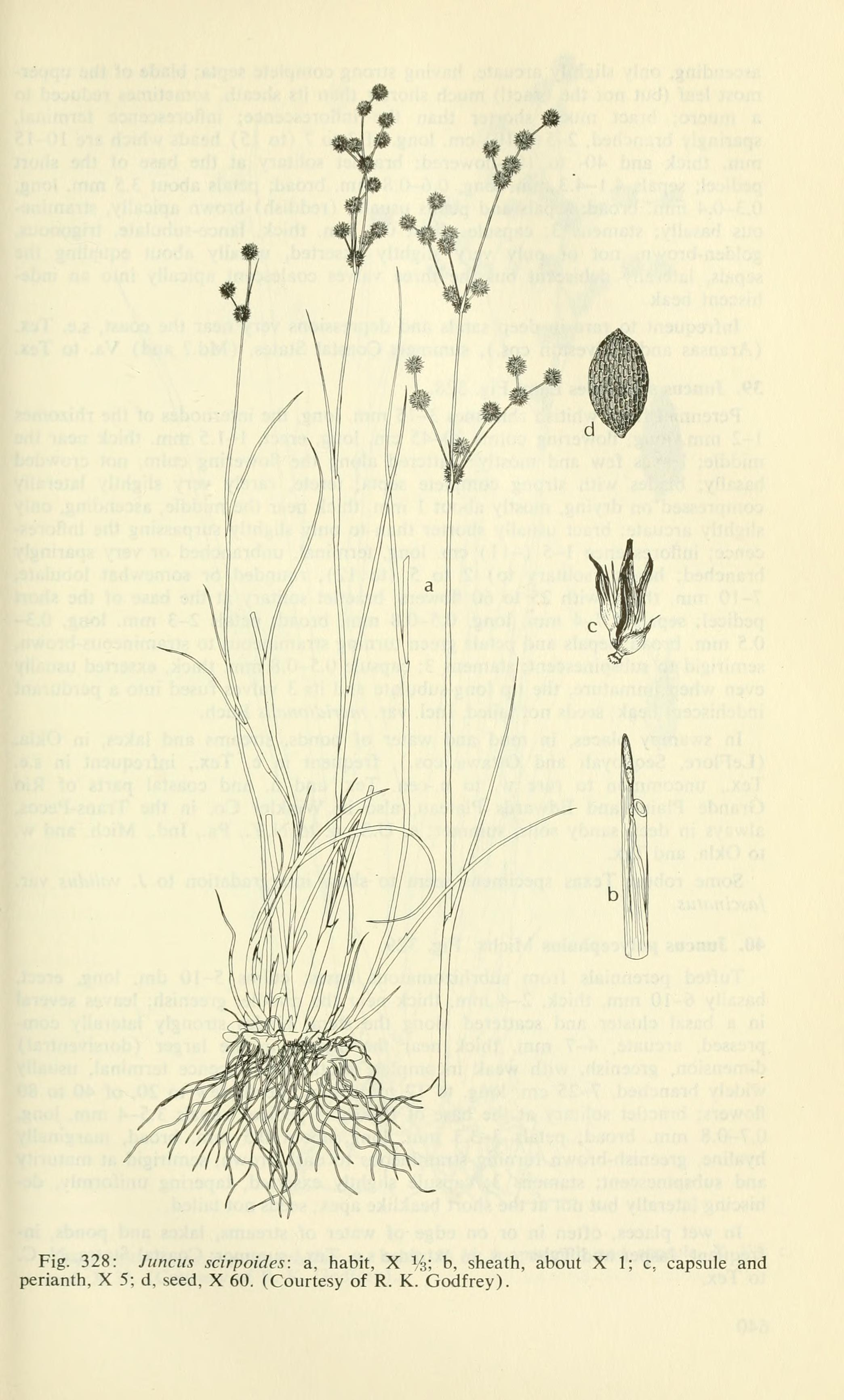
- Botanical illustration

Scientific classification
- Kingdom: Plantae
- Clade: Embryophytes
- Clade: Tracheophytes
- Clade: Spermatophytes
- Clade: Angiosperms
- Clade: Monocots
- Clade: Commelinids
- Order: Poales
- Family: Juncaceae
- Genus: Juncus
- Species: J. scirpoides

Binomial name
- Juncus scirpoides Lam.

Synonyms
- List: Juncus echinatus Elliott; Juncus macrostemon J.Gay ex Laharpe; Juncus nodosus var. multiflorus Torr.; Juncus scirpoides var. carolinianus Coville; Juncus scirpoides var. compositus R.M.Harper; Juncus scirpoides var. genuinus Buchenau; Juncus scirpoides var. macrostemon (J.Gay ex Laharpe) Engelm.; Juncus scirpoides macrostylus Engelm.; Tristemon echinatus Raf.; Tristemon polycephalus Raf.

= Juncus scirpoides =

Species of flowering plant

Juncus scirpoides, the needlepod rush or the lobe-headed rush, is a species of flowering plant in the family Juncaceae, native to the central and eastern United States. It prefers wet sandy soils, and among the many places it grows it is common in the enigmatic Carolina bays.
