= Juncus filicaulis =

Scientific classification
- Kingdom: Plantae
- Clade: Tracheophytes
- Clade: Angiosperms
- Clade: Monocots
- Clade: Commelinids
- Order: Poales
- Family: Juncaceae
- Genus: Juncus
- Species: J. filicaulis

Binomial name
- Juncus filicaulis Buchenau

Synonyms
- Juncus pauciflorus var. cheesemanii Buchenau; Juncus polyanthemus var. cheesemanii (Buchenau) Buchenau

Species of plant

Juncus filicaulis, the thread rush, is a species of flowering plant in the family Juncaceae. It is native to southeastern Australia, and it has been introduced to New Zealand. A perennial reaching 45 cm (18 in), it forms dense tufts.
