= Juncus tiehmii =

Scientific classification
- Kingdom: Plantae
- Clade: Tracheophytes
- Clade: Angiosperms
- Clade: Monocots
- Clade: Commelinids
- Order: Poales
- Family: Juncaceae
- Genus: Juncus
- Species: J. tiehmii

Binomial name
- Juncus tiehmii Ertter

Species of grass

Juncus tiehmii is a species of rush known by the common name Nevada rush. It is native to the western United States, where it grows in wet habitat with granite sand substrate, including riverbanks and barren seeps. This is a small annual herb forming dense clumps of hair-thin stems no more than about 6 centimeters high. The inflorescence is made up of one to seven tiny flowers atop each stem. The flowers have a few greenish to pink or red segments no more than about 3 millimeters long.
