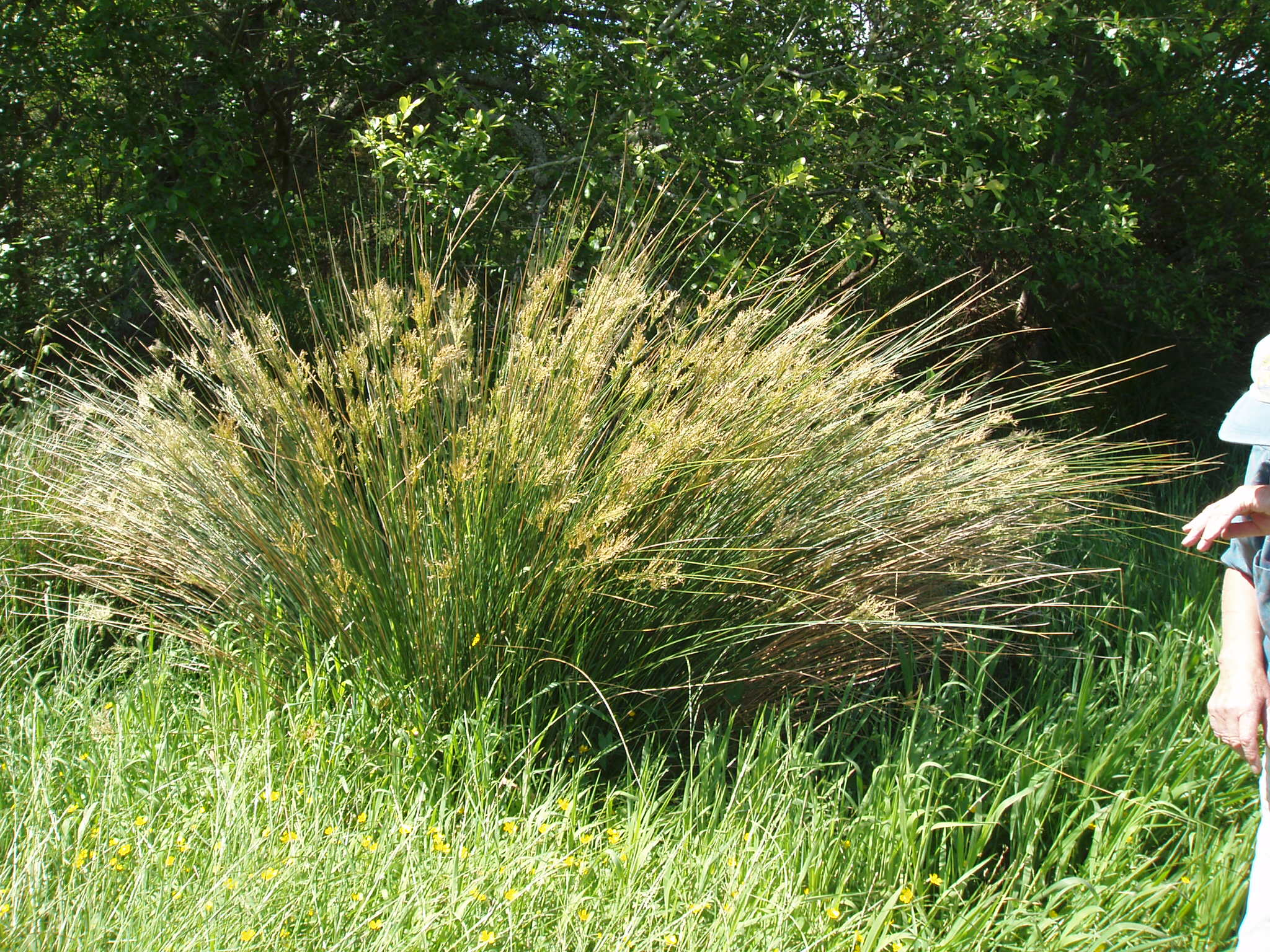
- Habit

Scientific classification
- Kingdom: Plantae
- Clade: Tracheophytes
- Clade: Angiosperms
- Clade: Monocots
- Clade: Commelinids
- Order: Poales
- Family: Juncaceae
- Genus: Juncus
- Species: J. sarophorus

Binomial name
- Juncus sarophorus L.A.S.Johnson

= Juncus sarophorus =

Species of plant

Juncus sarophorus, the broom rush or fan-flowered rush, is a species of flowering plant in the family Juncaceae. Native to southeastern Australia, and all of New Zealand except the Kermadec Islands, it also has been introduced to Great Britain. A dense tussock-forming perennial of wet areas, and somewhat weedy, its stems reach 2 m (6 ft) long but droop so that the plant overall is closer to 1 m (3 ft) tall.
