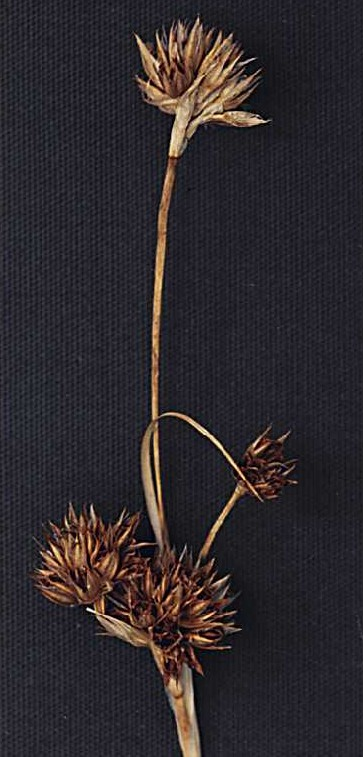

Scientific classification
- Kingdom: Plantae
- Clade: Tracheophytes
- Clade: Angiosperms
- Clade: Monocots
- Clade: Commelinids
- Order: Poales
- Family: Juncaceae
- Genus: Juncus
- Species: J. orthophyllus

Binomial name
- Juncus orthophyllus Coville

= Juncus orthophyllus =

Species of grass

Juncus orthophyllus is a species of rush known by the common name straightleaf rush native to western North America from British Columbia to California and Nevada, where it grows in moist spots in mountain habitat, such as meadows.

== Description ==
This is a perennial herb producing stems up to about 0.5 meters (20 in) tall from a tough, creeping rhizome. There are several flattened leaves around the stem bases, and sometimes one or more smaller leaves on the stem. The inflorescence is an open array of several clusters of up to 10 flowers each. The flower has rough-textured green segments with brown edges and bristles at the tips.
