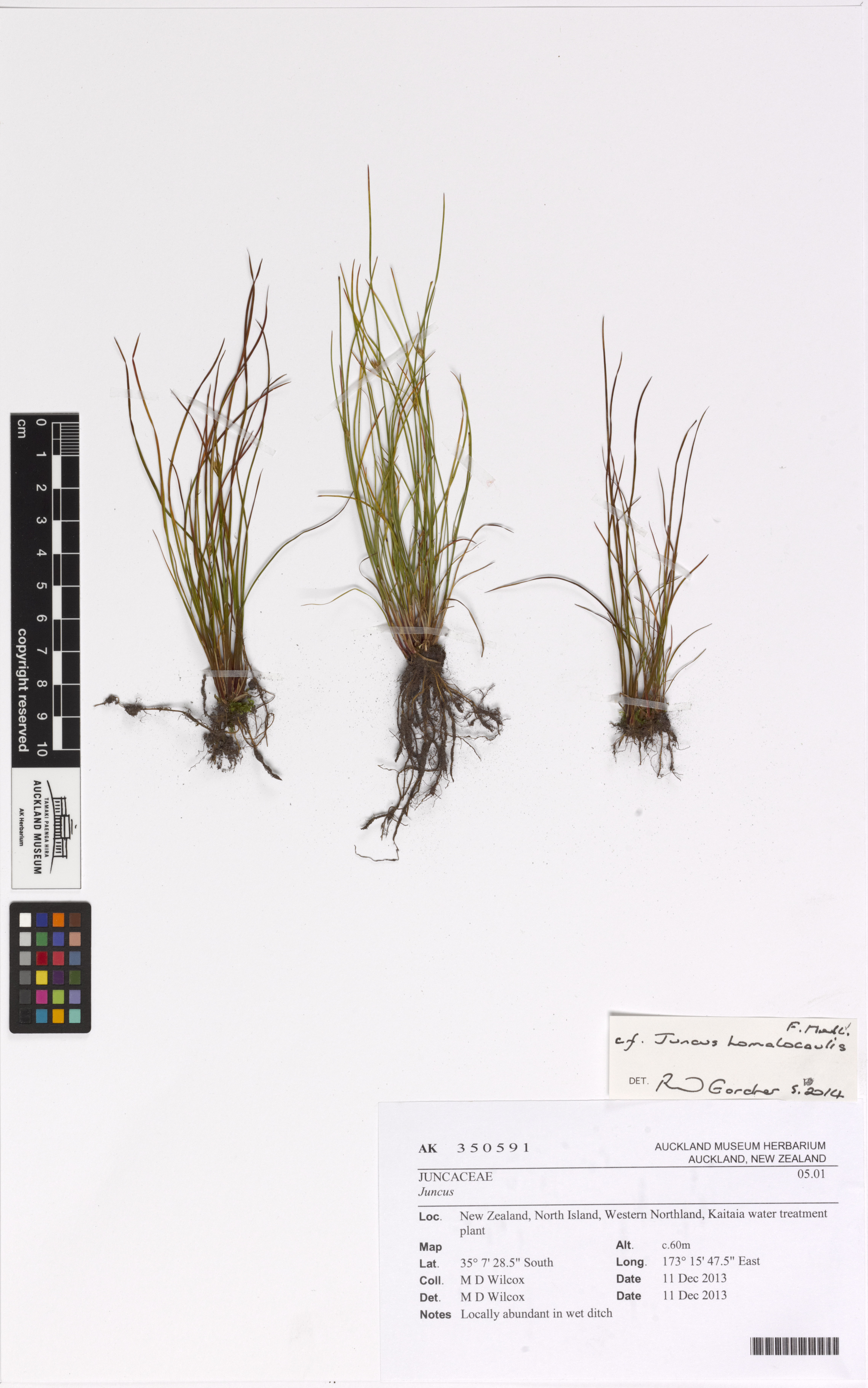

Scientific classification
- Kingdom: Plantae
- Clade: Tracheophytes
- Clade: Angiosperms
- Clade: Monocots
- Clade: Commelinids
- Order: Poales
- Family: Juncaceae
- Genus: Juncus
- Species: J. homalocaulis

Binomial name
- Juncus homalocaulis F.Muell. ex Benth.

Synonyms
- Juncus plebeius auct. non R.Br.

= Juncus homalocaulis =

Species of rush

Juncus homalocaulis is a species of flowering plant in the rush family, Juncaceae. A tufted, perennial plant growing from 5 cm to 35 cm tall, with stems 0.5 to 1.2 mm thick. Often found in Australia and New Zealand in moist grassland or woodland. The specific epithet is derived from Greek, meaning "even stem".
