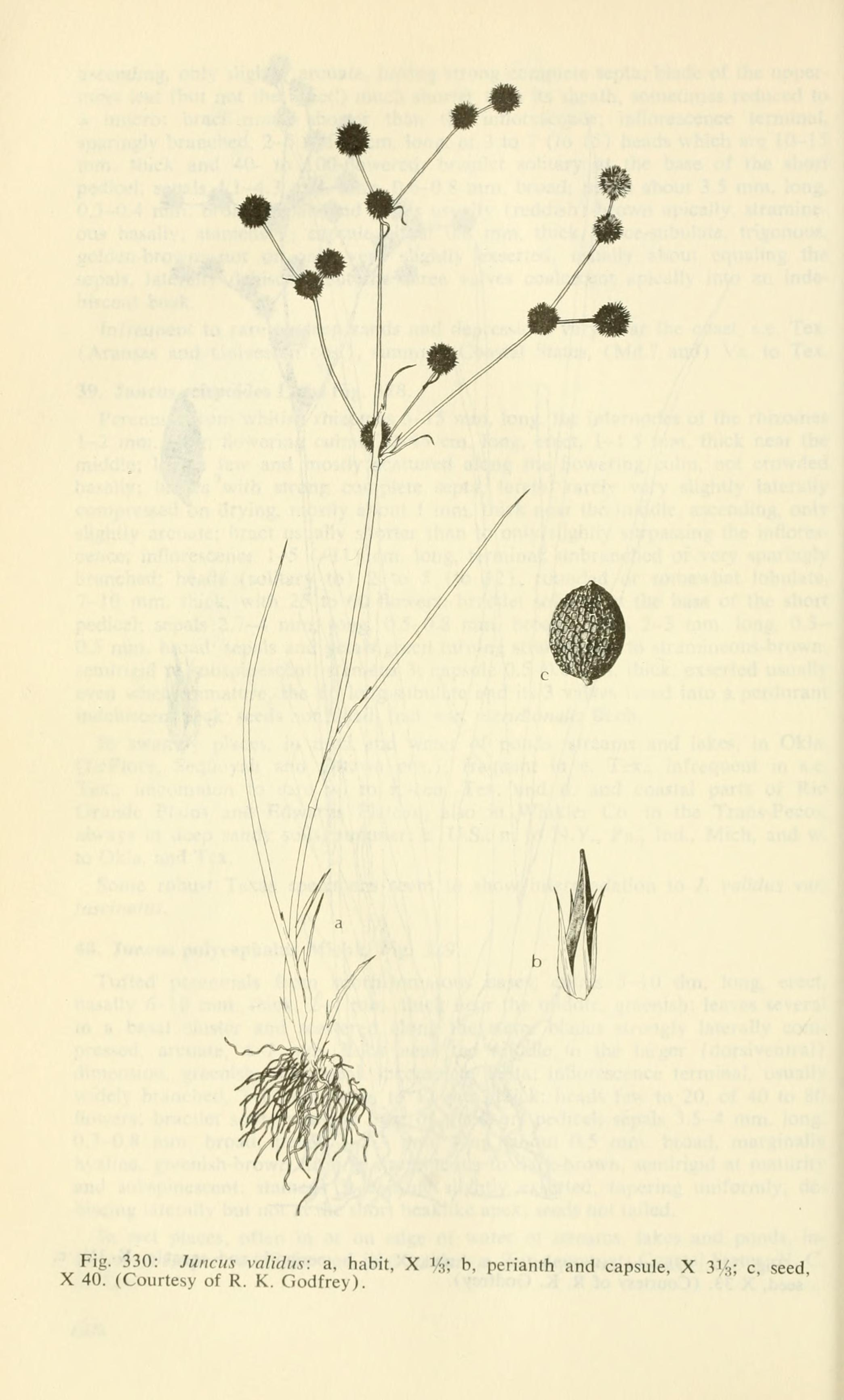
- Botanical illustration

Scientific classification
- Kingdom: Plantae
- Clade: Embryophytes
- Clade: Tracheophytes
- Clade: Spermatophytes
- Clade: Angiosperms
- Clade: Monocots
- Clade: Commelinids
- Order: Poales
- Family: Juncaceae
- Genus: Juncus
- Species: J. validus

Binomial name
- Juncus validus Coville

Synonyms
- Juncus crassifolius Buchenau; Juncus scirpoides subvar. major Engelm.

= Juncus validus =

Species of flowering plant

Juncus validus, the roundhead rush, is a species of flowering plant in the family Juncaceae, native to the central and southeastern United States. It is a somewhat weedy species, found along wet roadsides and in ditches.
