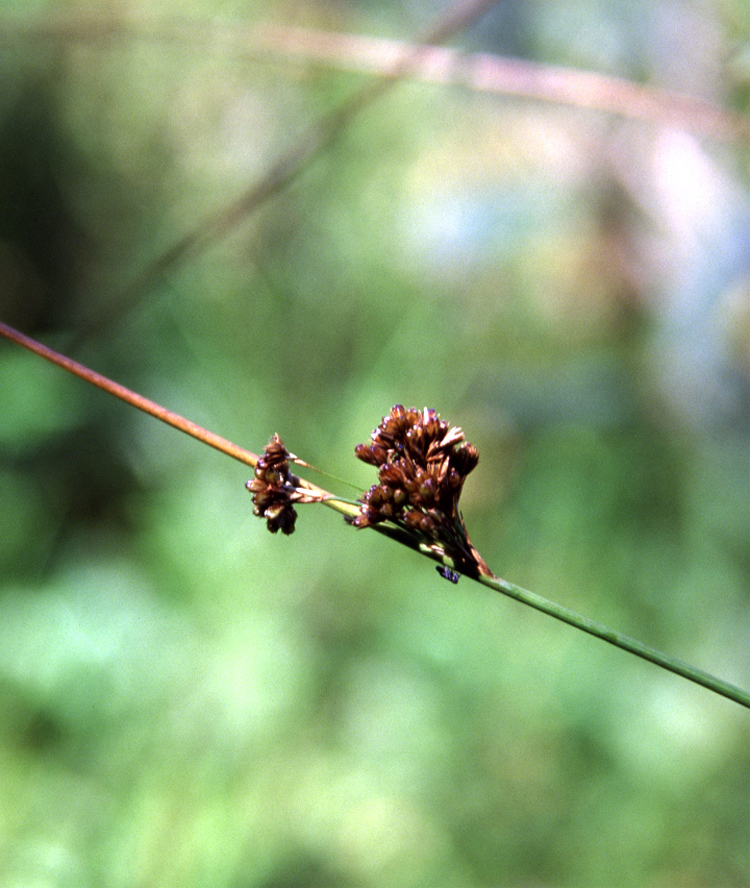

Conservation status
- Secure (NatureServe)

Scientific classification
- Kingdom: Plantae
- Clade: Tracheophytes
- Clade: Angiosperms
- Clade: Monocots
- Clade: Commelinids
- Order: Poales
- Family: Juncaceae
- Genus: Juncus
- Species: J. lesueurii

Binomial name
- Juncus lesueurii Bol.

Synonyms
- Juncus lescurii

= Juncus lesueurii =

Species of grass

Juncus lesueurii is a species of rush known by the common names Lesueur's rush and salt rush. It is accepted by some authorities as Juncus lescurii.

== Distribution ==
It is native to the western coast of North America from British Columbia to California, where it grows in freshwater and salt marshes, and near sand dunes.

== Description ==
It is a rhizomatous perennial herb forming clumps of stems often well exceeding one meter in height. The inflorescence is a cluster of several greenish or brownish flowers accompanied by one cylindrical bract which looks like an extension of the stem.
