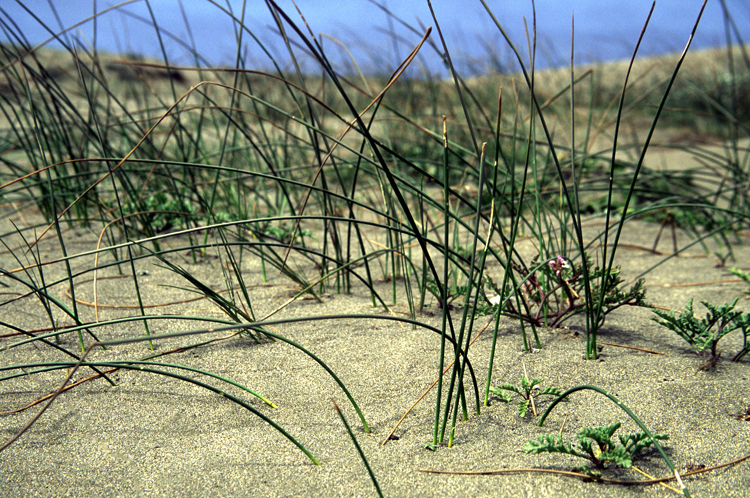

Scientific classification
- Kingdom: Plantae
- Clade: Tracheophytes
- Clade: Angiosperms
- Clade: Monocots
- Clade: Commelinids
- Order: Poales
- Family: Juncaceae
- Genus: Juncus
- Species: J. breweri

Binomial name
- Juncus breweri Engelm.

= Juncus breweri =

Species of grass

Juncus breweri is a species of rush known by the common name Brewer's rush. It is native to western North America from British Columbia to northern California, where it grows in coastal habitat such as beaches and marshes. It is a perennial herb growing from a tough rhizome which anchors it in sand and other unstable substrate. It produces slender stems up to 1.3 metres (4 ft 3 in) long. The leaves are bladeless and are reduced to dark brown sheaths around the stem bases. The inflorescence is a cluster of flowers emerging from the stem and accompanied by a single long, cylindrical bract which looks much like an extension of the stem. The flowers have purplish brown and greenish segments a few millimeters long.
