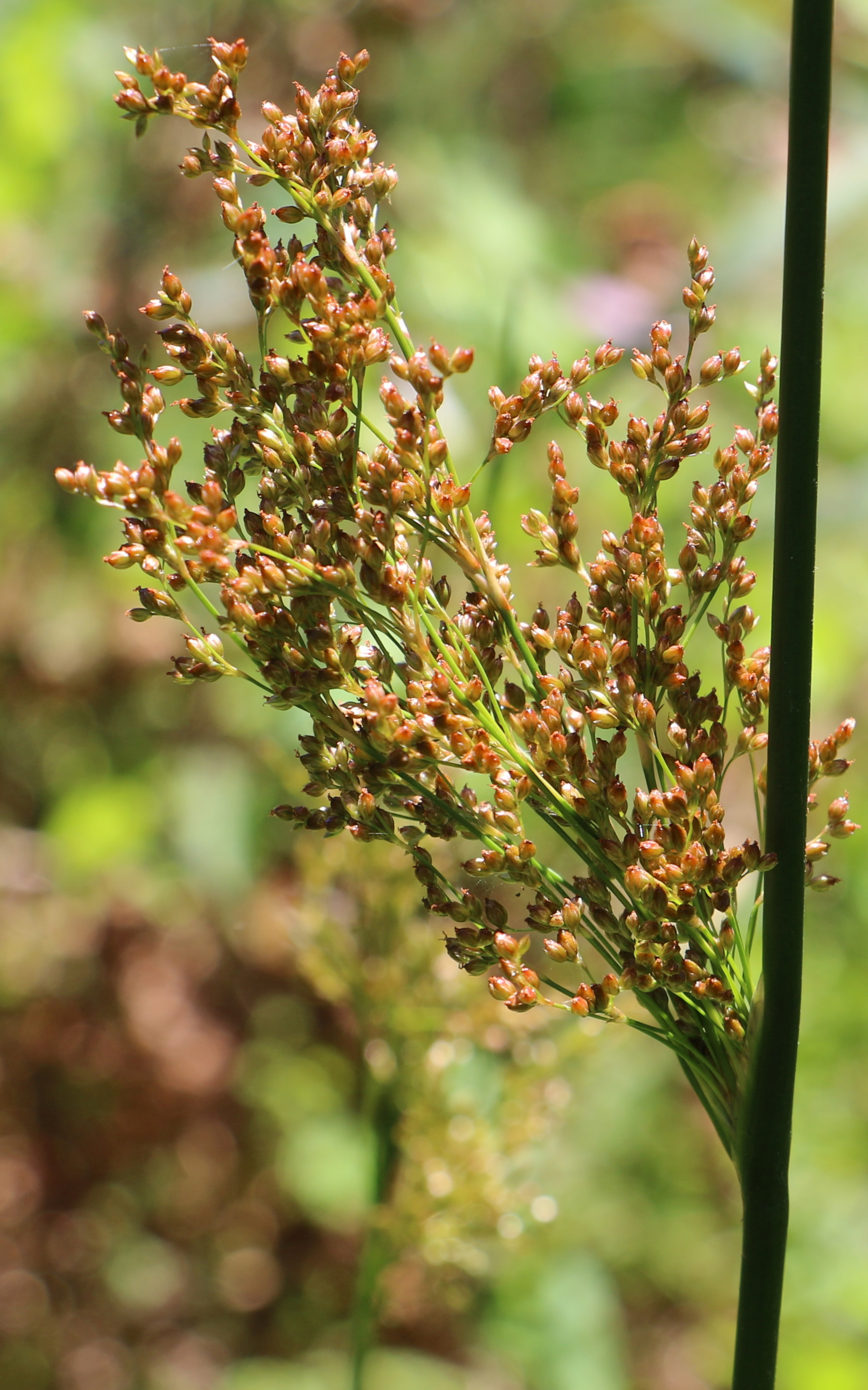
- Dee Why, Australia

Scientific classification
- Kingdom: Plantae
- Clade: Tracheophytes
- Clade: Angiosperms
- Clade: Monocots
- Clade: Commelinids
- Order: Poales
- Family: Juncaceae
- Genus: Juncus
- Species: J. continuus

Binomial name
- Juncus continuus L.A.S.Johnson

= Juncus continuus =

Species of plant native to Australia

Juncus continuus is a perennial plant found in many parts of Australia; namely the regions of Queensland and New South Wales. Juncus continuus has also been introduced in Great Britain and New Zealand, and invasive in Texas. Often growing on sandy, moist soils, near fresh water. The specific epithet refers to the continuous pith within the stems. Basal leaves are reduced to sheaths, colored yellow/brown and split at the base. While the Juncus continuus is a fairly new discovery, its plant family has been documented for many years. First beginning in a journal published by Johann Friedrich Gmelin titled, "Systema Naturae" between 1788 and 1793. The Juncus Continuus, like its many cousins, is a flowering plant, sporting clusters of small brown flowers on the ends of leaf-like stems.

== Characteristics ==
This plant is described as having the following characteristics:

- 35–115 cm long culms
- 1.2-3.0 mm in diameter
- Cataphylls are 8–14 cm long
- Numerous flowers that are solitary or loosely clustered
- Straw-brown tepals
- The ellipsoid capsule of the flower is longer than, or equaling the length of outer tepals
- The Juncaceous family is generally perennial and known as a compact rush

== Gallery ==
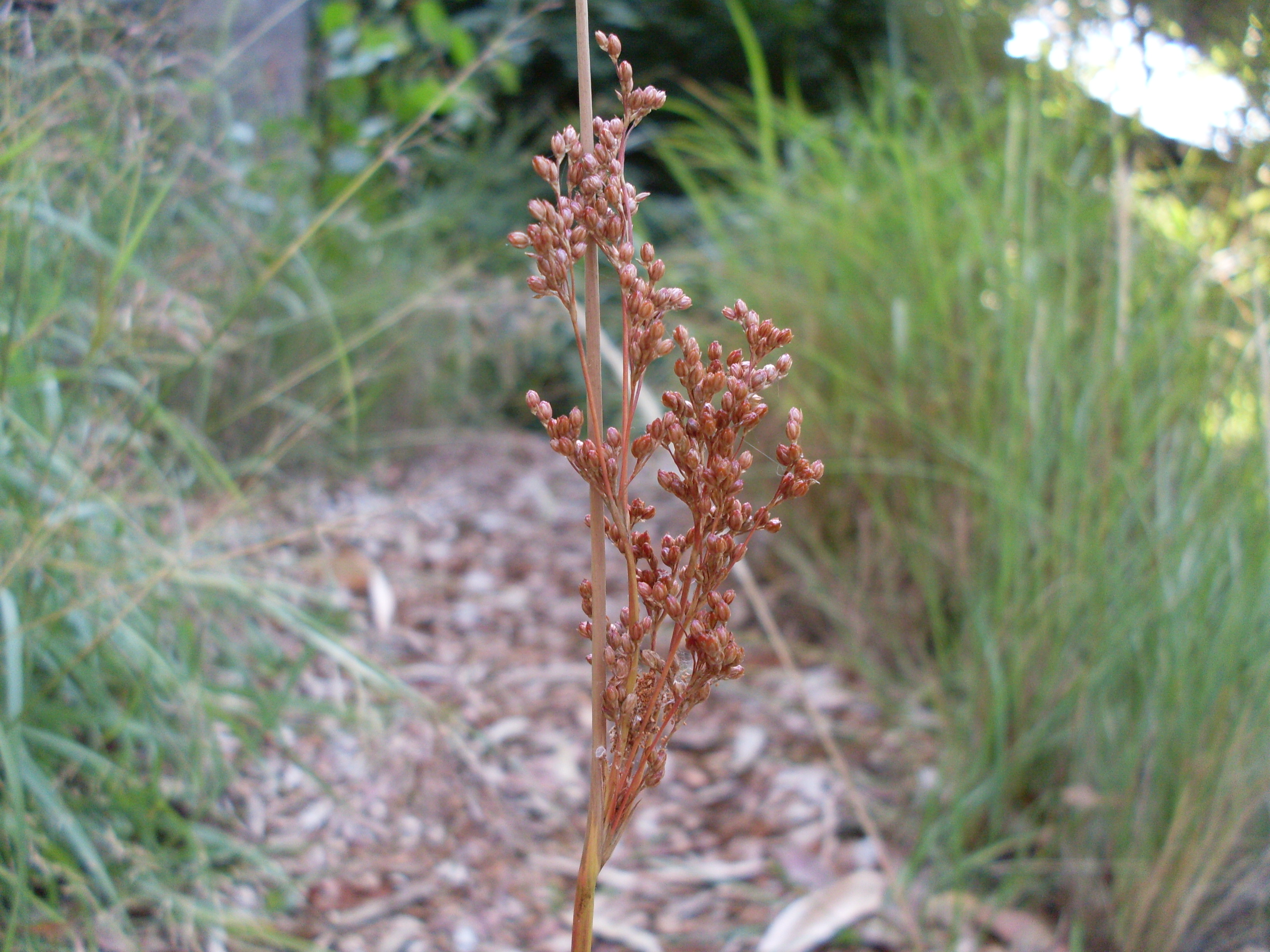

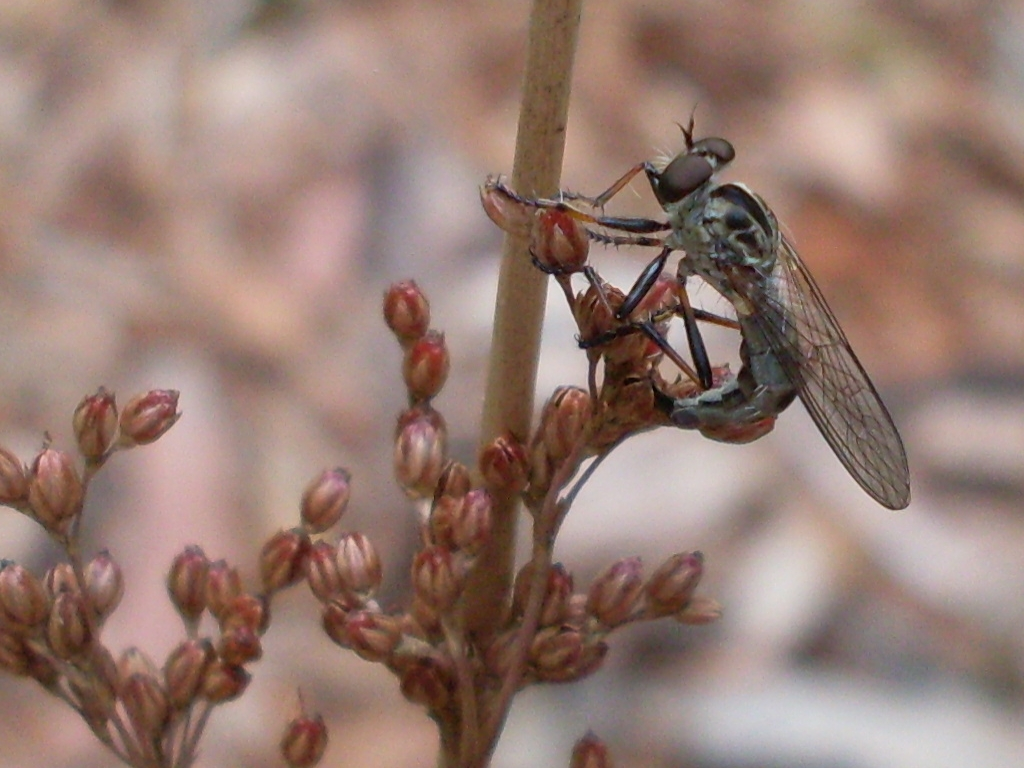

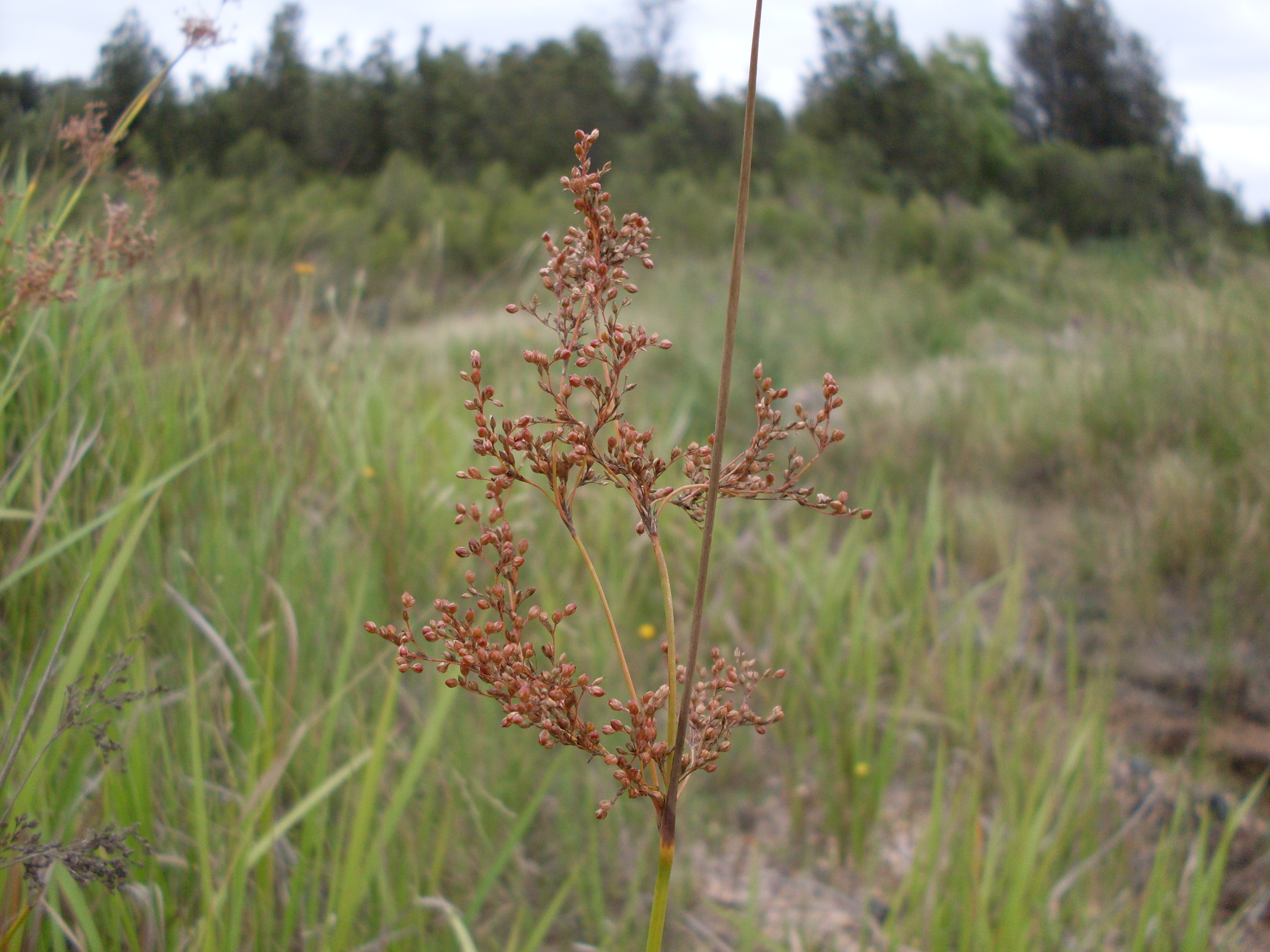

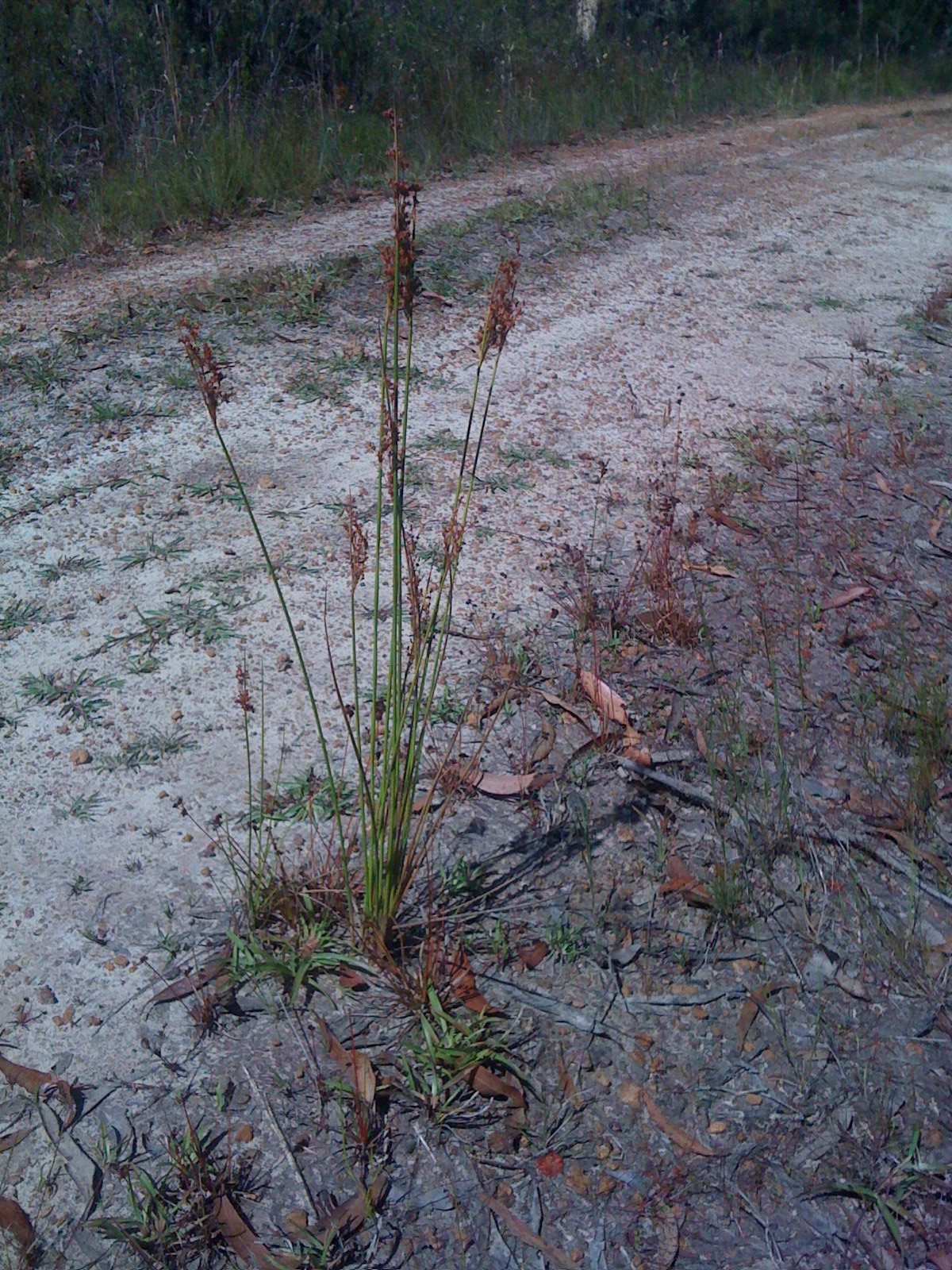
