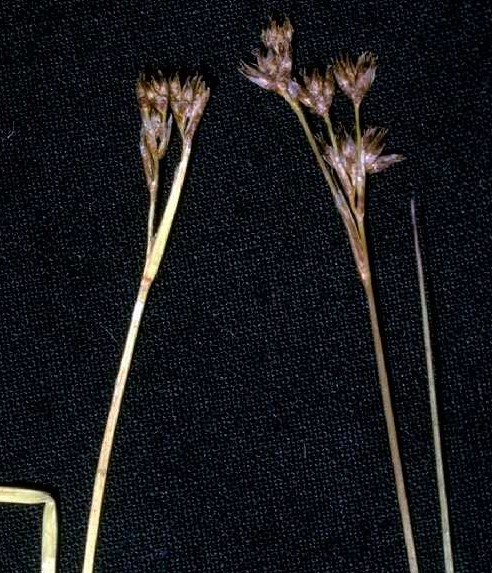

Scientific classification
- Kingdom: Plantae
- Clade: Tracheophytes
- Clade: Angiosperms
- Clade: Monocots
- Clade: Commelinids
- Order: Poales
- Family: Juncaceae
- Genus: Juncus
- Species: J. nevadensis

Binomial name
- Juncus nevadensis S.Wats.

= Juncus nevadensis =

Species of grass

Juncus nevadensis is a species of rush known by the common name Sierra rush. It is native to much of western North America from British Columbia to New Mexico, where it grows in wet areas in many habitat types. This is a rhizomatous perennial herb which varies in appearance. Its thin, smooth stems reach a maximum height between 10 and 70 centimeters. The thin green leaves may be up to 30 centimeters long. The inflorescences generally contain a number of flowers, with each flower bearing dark to very light brown tepals, six stamens with large anthers, and very long stigmas. The fruit is a shiny chestnut brown capsule.
