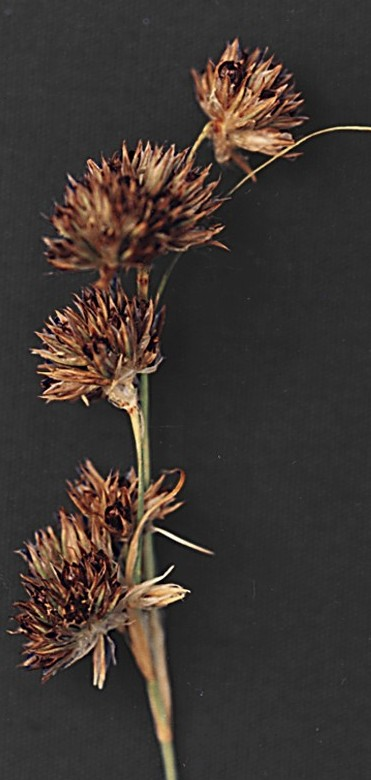

Scientific classification
- Kingdom: Plantae
- Clade: Embryophytes
- Clade: Tracheophytes
- Clade: Spermatophytes
- Clade: Angiosperms
- Clade: Monocots
- Clade: Commelinids
- Order: Poales
- Family: Juncaceae
- Genus: Juncus
- Species: J. howellii

Binomial name
- Juncus howellii F.J.Herm.

= Juncus howellii =

Species of flowering plant

Juncus howellii is a species of rush known by the common name Howell's rush. It is native to the northwestern United States, where it grows in moist mountain meadows. This is a perennial herb growing from a thick rhizome and producing stems up to about 60 centimeters 60 centimeters (24 in) tall. The inflorescence is a series of clusters of small flowers, each flower with brown or green pointed segments a few millimeters long.
