= Juncus hemiendytus =

Scientific classification
- Kingdom: Plantae
- Clade: Embryophytes
- Clade: Tracheophytes
- Clade: Spermatophytes
- Clade: Angiosperms
- Clade: Monocots
- Clade: Commelinids
- Order: Poales
- Family: Juncaceae
- Genus: Juncus
- Species: J. hemiendytus

Binomial name
- Juncus hemiendytus F.J.Herm.

Species of flowering plant

Juncus hemiendytus is a species of rush known by the common name Herman's dwarf rush. It is native to the western United States, where it grows in moist places, especially areas that are wet in spring, such as vernal pools. This is a very small annual herb forming dense clumps of hair-thin reddish stems no more than about 3 centimeters (1.2 in) tall. The tiny, thready leaves surrounding the stems are up to about 2 centimeters (0.8 in) long. Each stem usually bears one reddish flower, which is made up of segments 2 or 3 millimeters long curving around the developing fruit.
