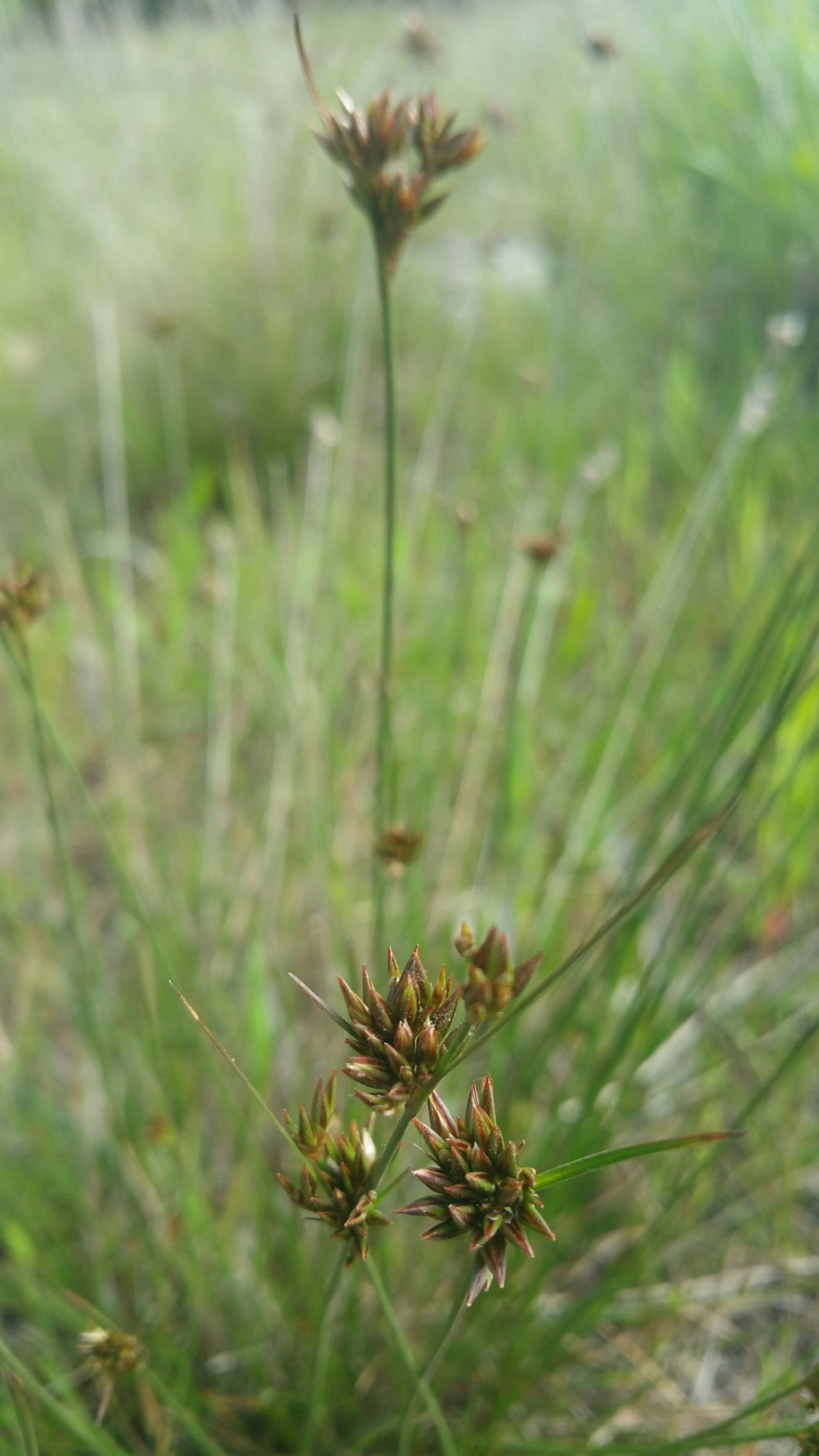

Scientific classification
- Kingdom: Plantae
- Clade: Tracheophytes
- Clade: Angiosperms
- Clade: Monocots
- Clade: Commelinids
- Order: Poales
- Family: Juncaceae
- Genus: Juncus
- Species: J. occidentalis

Binomial name
- Juncus occidentalis Wiegand

= Juncus occidentalis =

Species of grass

Juncus occidentalis is a species of rush known by the common name western rush. It is native to the western United States, where it grows in wet areas in many types of habitat. This is a bunching perennial herb with thin, stiff stems reaching maximum heights between 30 and 60 centimeters. The wispy leaves grow from the base of the stem and may approach half the stem's length. The inflorescence holds loose bundles of individual flowers and there is usually one long, leaflike bract extending far past the flowers. Each flower has green-striped brownish to reddish tepals each several millimeters long, and six stamens with small anthers. The fruit is a brown capsule which grows encased within the tepals.
