= Juncus papillosus =

Scientific classification
- Kingdom: Plantae
- Clade: Tracheophytes
- Clade: Angiosperms
- Clade: Monocots
- Clade: Commelinids
- Order: Poales
- Family: Juncaceae
- Genus: Juncus
- Species: J. papillosus

Binomial name
- Juncus papillosus Franch. & Sav.

Synonyms
- Juncus nikkoensis Satake; Juncus nikkoensis var. minor Satake; Juncus niponensis Buchenau; Juncus niponensis var. hakodatensis H.Lév.; Juncus umbellifer H.Lév. & Vaniot

Species of plant

Juncus papillosus, the papillose rush, is a species of flowering plant in the family Juncaceae, native to eastern China, the Korean Peninsula, Japan, and the southern part of the Russian Far East. A perennial 15 to 50 cm (6 to 20 in) tall with terete stems and leaves, it is typically found in swampy meadows. Its chromosome count is 2n = 40.
