= Juncus kelloggii =

Scientific classification
- Kingdom: Plantae
- Clade: Tracheophytes
- Clade: Angiosperms
- Clade: Monocots
- Clade: Commelinids
- Order: Poales
- Family: Juncaceae
- Genus: Juncus
- Species: J. kelloggii

Binomial name
- Juncus kelloggii Engelm.

Species of grass

Juncus kelloggii is a species of rush known by the common name Kellogg's dwarf rush. It is native to western North America from British Columbia to California to the Baja California peninsula, where it grows in low, wet spots in meadows and other grassy areas, for example, vernal pools.

== Description ==
Juncus kelloggii is a tiny annual herb forming small, dense clumps of hairlike reddish stems no more than a few centimeters tall. The stems are surrounded by a few thready leaves.

The inflorescence is a cluster of approximately three flowers atop the small stems. Each flower is made up of a few reddish segments just 2 or 3 millimeters long curved around the developing fruit.
