= Juncus maximowiczii =

Scientific classification
- Kingdom: Plantae
- Clade: Tracheophytes
- Clade: Angiosperms
- Clade: Monocots
- Clade: Commelinids
- Order: Poales
- Family: Juncaceae
- Genus: Juncus
- Species: J. maximowiczii

Binomial name
- Juncus maximowiczii Buchenau

Synonyms
- Juncus cupreus H.Lév. & Vaniot; Juncus maximowiczii f. rostratus Satake; Juncus takasagomontanus Satake; Juncus triflorus Ohwi, 1937

Species of grass

Juncus maximowiczii is a species of plant in the genus Juncus, native to China, Korea and Japan. It grows in wet areas of mountains.

== Characteristics ==
- Juncus maximowiczii is 5–10 cm tall, perennial.
- The stems are tufted, slender, terete or angled.
- The leaves are filiform, more or less compressed, and the radical leaves are slightly shorter to longer than the stems.
- The flowers are 5–6 mm long, in terminal, solitary heads, and often come 2-3 together, sessile, with ovary. The perianth is linear and obtuse. The 6 stamens are 5–6 mm long, and the filaments are longer than anthers.
- The fruits are capsules of yellowish or light brown color are obovoid, ellipsoid, and longer than perianth. There are 0.5 mm long white tail at both ends of the seeds.
