= Juncus uncialis =

Scientific classification
- Kingdom: Plantae
- Clade: Embryophytes
- Clade: Tracheophytes
- Clade: Spermatophytes
- Clade: Angiosperms
- Clade: Monocots
- Clade: Commelinids
- Order: Poales
- Family: Juncaceae
- Genus: Juncus
- Species: J. uncialis

Binomial name
- Juncus uncialis Greene

Species of flowering plant

Juncus uncialis is a species of rush known by the common names twelfth rush and inch-high rush. It is native to the western United States, where it is known from wet habitat such as vernal pools. This is a petite annual herb forming dense clumps of hair-thin green stems no more than 3 or 4 centimeters (1.2 or 1.6 in) high. The inflorescence is made up of a single tiny flower atop each stem. The flower has several reddish segments about 2 to 5 millimeters long wrapped around the developing fruit.
