= Juncus fauriei =

Scientific classification
- Kingdom: Plantae
- Clade: Tracheophytes
- Clade: Angiosperms
- Clade: Monocots
- Clade: Commelinids
- Order: Poales
- Family: Juncaceae
- Genus: Juncus
- Species: J. fauriei

Binomial name
- Juncus fauriei H.Lév. & Vaniot

Synonyms
- Juncus balticus var. japonicus Buchenau; Juncus glaucus var. yokoscensis Franch. & Sav.; Juncus yokoscensis (Franch. & Sav.) Satake; Juncus yokoscensis var. laxus Satake

Species of plant

Juncus fauriei is a species of flowering plant in the rush family Juncaceae, native to central Korea, central Japan, and the Kuril Islands. A perennial, it is found in wetlands, frequently in sandy soils near the coast. Its chromosome count is 2n = 80.
