= Juncus leiospermus =

Conservation status
- Imperiled (NatureServe)

Scientific classification
- Kingdom: Plantae
- Clade: Tracheophytes
- Clade: Angiosperms
- Clade: Monocots
- Clade: Commelinids
- Order: Poales
- Family: Juncaceae
- Genus: Juncus
- Species: J. leiospermus

Binomial name
- Juncus leiospermus F.J.Herm.

Species of grass

Juncus leiospermus is an uncommon species of rush known by the common name Red Bluff dwarf rush. It is endemic to California, where it is known only from the Central Valley and adjacent Sierra Nevada foothills to the east.

== Description ==
Juncus leiospermus is a plant of vernal pools and other wet seasonal depressions in the local habitat. It is a small annual herb forming dense clumps of hairlike reddish brown stems no more than 10–11 centimetres (3.9–4.3 in) tall. The stems are surrounded by a few thready leaves.

The inflorescence is a single cluster of several reddish flowers atop the small stems.
