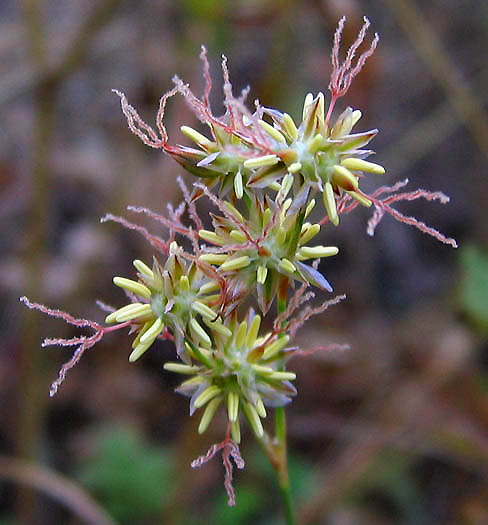
- flowers in bloom

Conservation status
- Apparently Secure (NatureServe)

Scientific classification
- Kingdom: Plantae
- Clade: Tracheophytes
- Clade: Angiosperms
- Clade: Monocots
- Clade: Commelinids
- Order: Poales
- Family: Juncaceae
- Genus: Juncus
- Species: J. macrophyllus

Binomial name
- Juncus macrophyllus Coville

= Juncus macrophyllus =

Species of flowering plant

Juncus macrophyllus is a species of rush known by the common name longleaf rush.

It is native to the southwestern United States and Baja California, where it grows in wet spots in several types of local habitat, such as chaparral.

== Description ==
Juncus macrophyllus is a rhizomatous perennial herb forming tufts of stems up to one meter tall. The sheaths on the basal leaves are between 1.5 and 3.4 millimeters long. The blade has a flat side towards the stem. The stem is between 1.5 and 3 millimeters wide. There are 1 to 2 thick cauline leaves. The inflorescence is an open array of many clusters of a few flowers each. The flower has several segments each about 5 millimeters long. There are a range of 8 to 30 flower clusters. The petals are bigger than the sepals. The midveins generally have red streaks. The fruit is obovoid and shiny brown. The elevation it can be found in ranges from 700 to 2600 meters. The bloom period is between the months of July and October.
