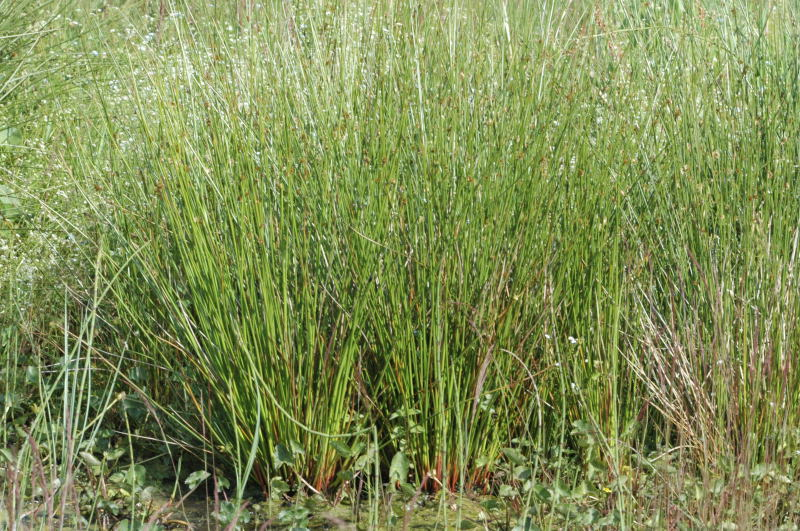
- Habit of J. conglomeratus
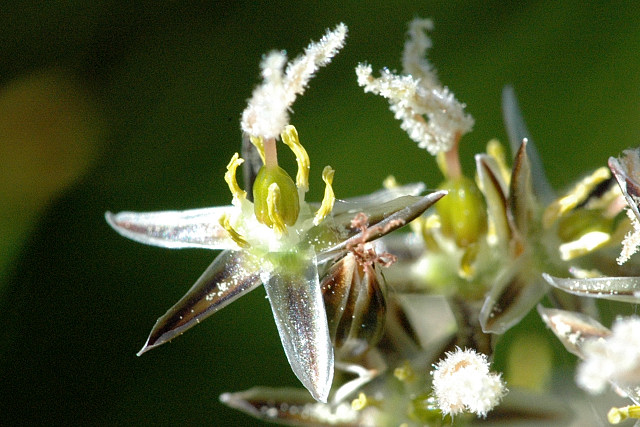
- Flower of J. squarrosus showing: 6 spreading tepals, anthers (upright yellow, held on white filaments), ovary (green) with stigma (pinkish tip column) and styles (white)

Scientific classification
- Kingdom: Plantae
- Clade: Embryophytes
- Clade: Tracheophytes
- Clade: Angiosperms
- Clade: Monocots
- Clade: Commelinids
- Order: Poales
- Family: Juncaceae
- Genus: Juncus; L.

Type species
- Juncus acutus L.

Synonyms
- Agathryon (Raf.) Záv.Drábk. & Proćków, nom. superfl.; Alpinojuncus Záv.Drábk. & Proćków; Australojuncus Záv.Drábk. & Proćków; Boreojuncus Záv.Drábk. & Proćków, nom. superfl.; Cephaloxys Desv.; Juncastrum Fourr., not validly published; Juncinella Fourr., not validly published; Marsippospermum Desv.; Microschoenus C.B.Clarke; Phylloschoenus Fourr., not validly published; Rostkovia Desv.; Tenageia (Dumort.) Fourr.; Tristemon Raf. (1838); Verojuncus Záv.Drábk. & Proćków

= Juncus =

Genus of flowering plants in the rush family

Juncus is a genus of monocotyledonous flowering plants, commonly known as rushes. It is the largest genus in the family Juncaceae, containing around 340 species.

== Description ==
Rushes of the genus Juncus are herbaceous plants that superficially resemble grasses or sedges. They have historically received little attention from botanists; in his 1819 monograph, James Ebenezer Bicheno described the genus as "obscure and uninviting".

The form of the flower differentiates rushes from grasses or sedges. The flowers of Juncus comprise five whorls of floral parts: three sepals, three petals (or, taken together, six tepals), two to six stamens (in two whorls) and a stigma with three lobes. The stems are round in cross-section, unlike those of sedges, which are typically somewhat triangular in cross-section.

In Juncus section Juncotypus (formerly called Juncus subg. Genuini), which contains some of the most widespread and familiar species, the leaves are reduced to sheaths around the base of the stem and the bract subtending the inflorescence closely resembles a continuation of the stem, giving the appearance that the inflorescence is lateral.

== Distribution and ecology ==
Juncus has a cosmopolitan distribution, with species found throughout the world, with the exception of Antarctica. They typically grow in cold or wet habitats, and in the tropics, are most common in montane environments. While typically described as a wind-pollinated genus, recent evidence suggests that some species may be partially insect pollinated.

Juncus species often prefer wetland habitats, such as salt marshes and seeps. For this reason, they often interact with water-borne pollutants and are therefore suspected to uptake these pollutants when they are present in the environment. Research suggests strategic planting of Juncus species may be an effective tactic to clean contaminated water through biotic methods.

Juncus species are important members of the ecosystems they inhabit, providing food and creating habitat for many other organisms, including microbes, insects, amphibians, fish, and birds. Certain species have also been shown to alter the often heavily waterlogged soils they grow in around their roots, increasing the oxygen concentration and changing the pH. Beyond this, Juncus species across their range have been used in diverse ecological studies, including those relating to precipitation effects on marsh species, salt tolerance in brackish wetland plants, the effects of Juncus presence on plant diversity, and the effects of wetland plants on microbial soil communities.

Selected Juncus Habitats

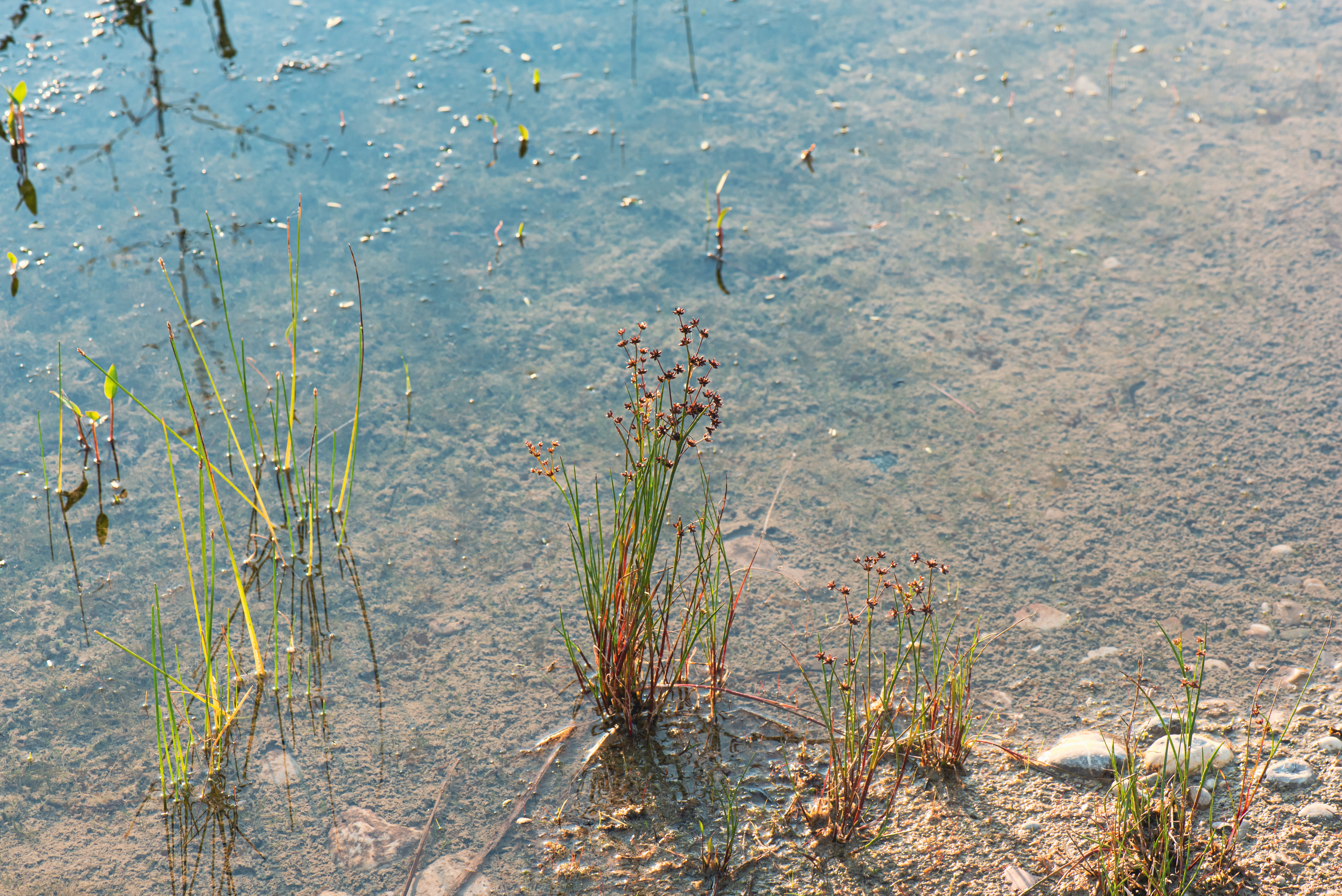
Juncus articulatus in wetland habitat, Germany

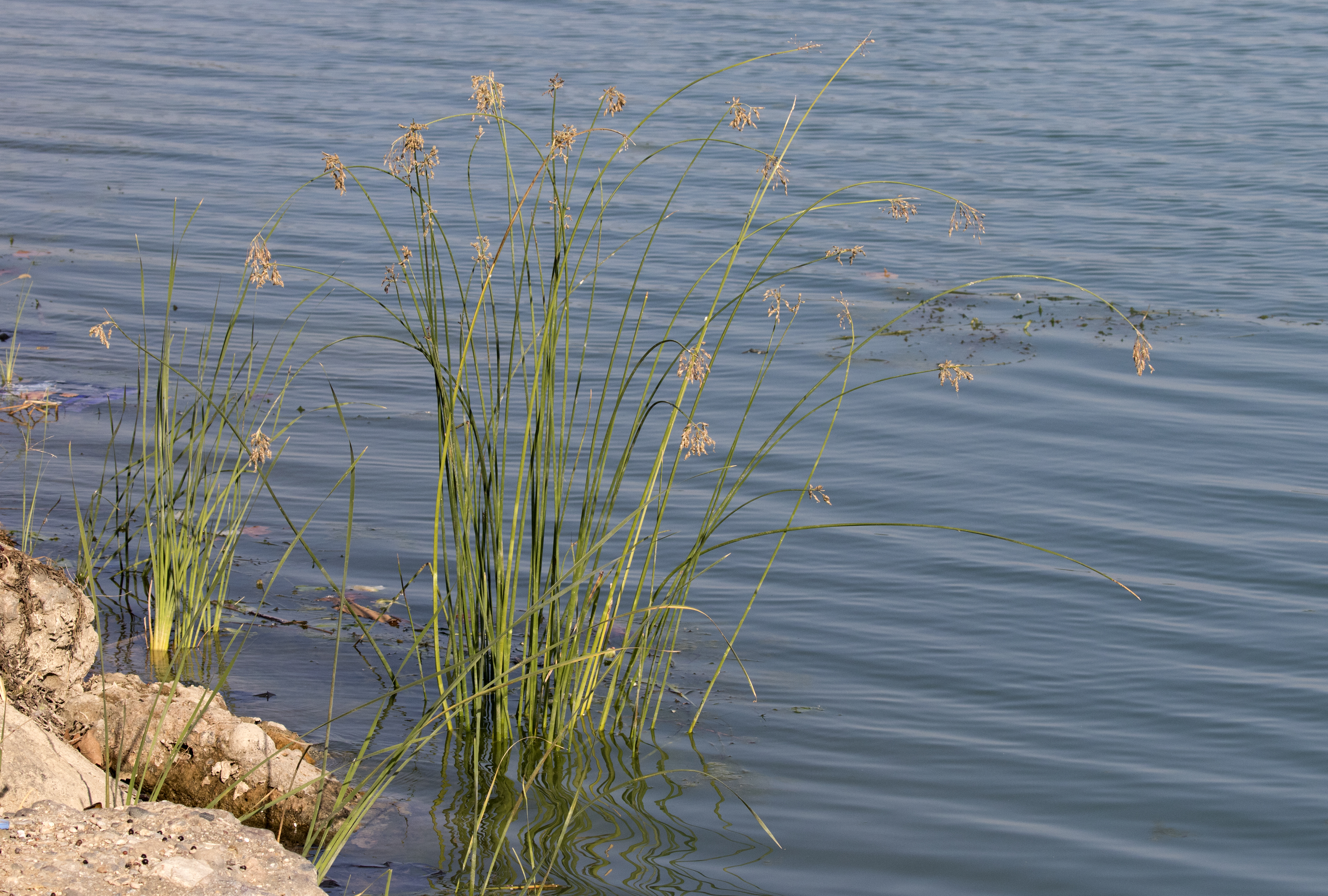
Juncus sp. in wetland habitat, Turkey

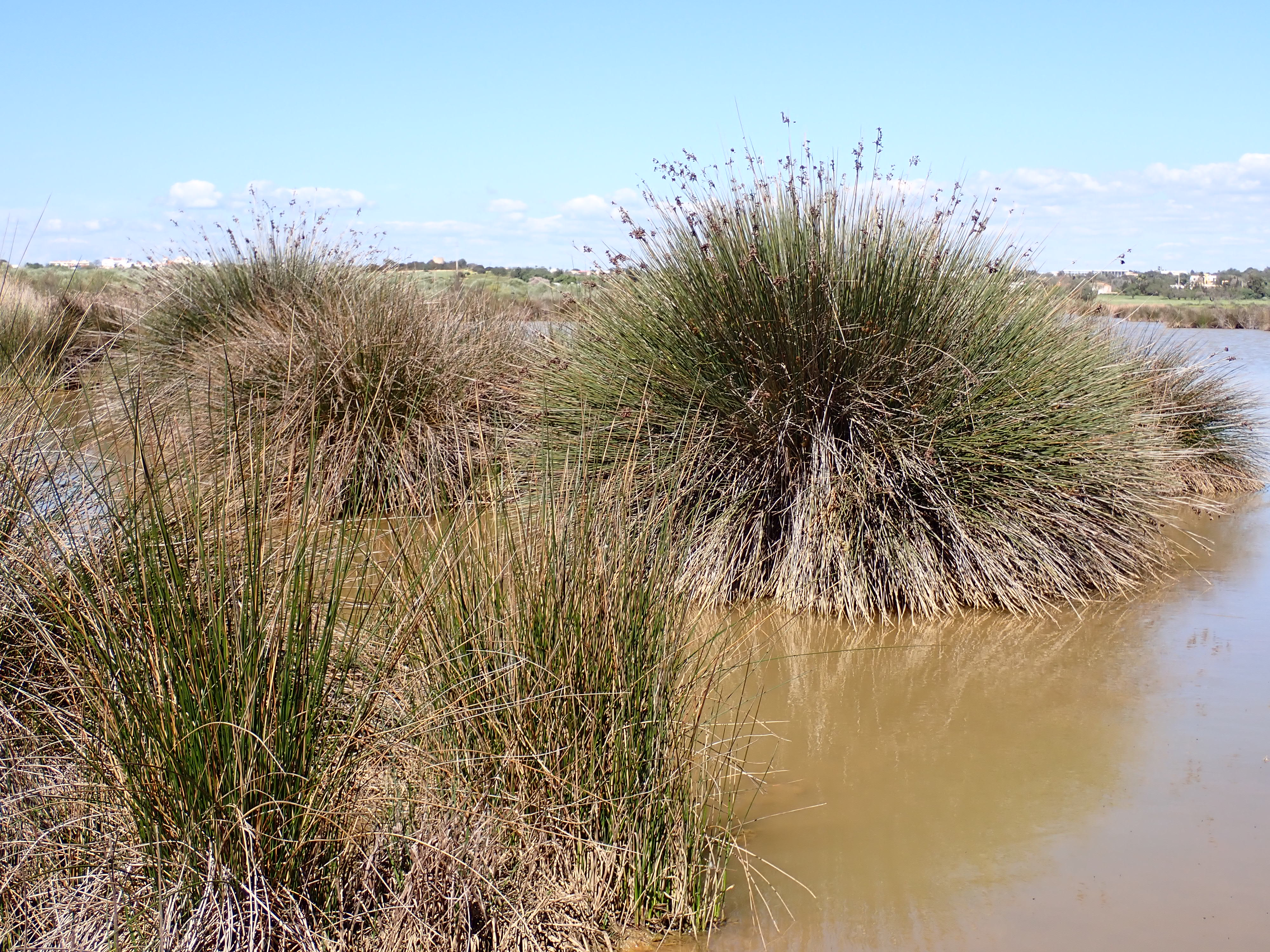
Juncus acutus in wetland habitat, Uruguay

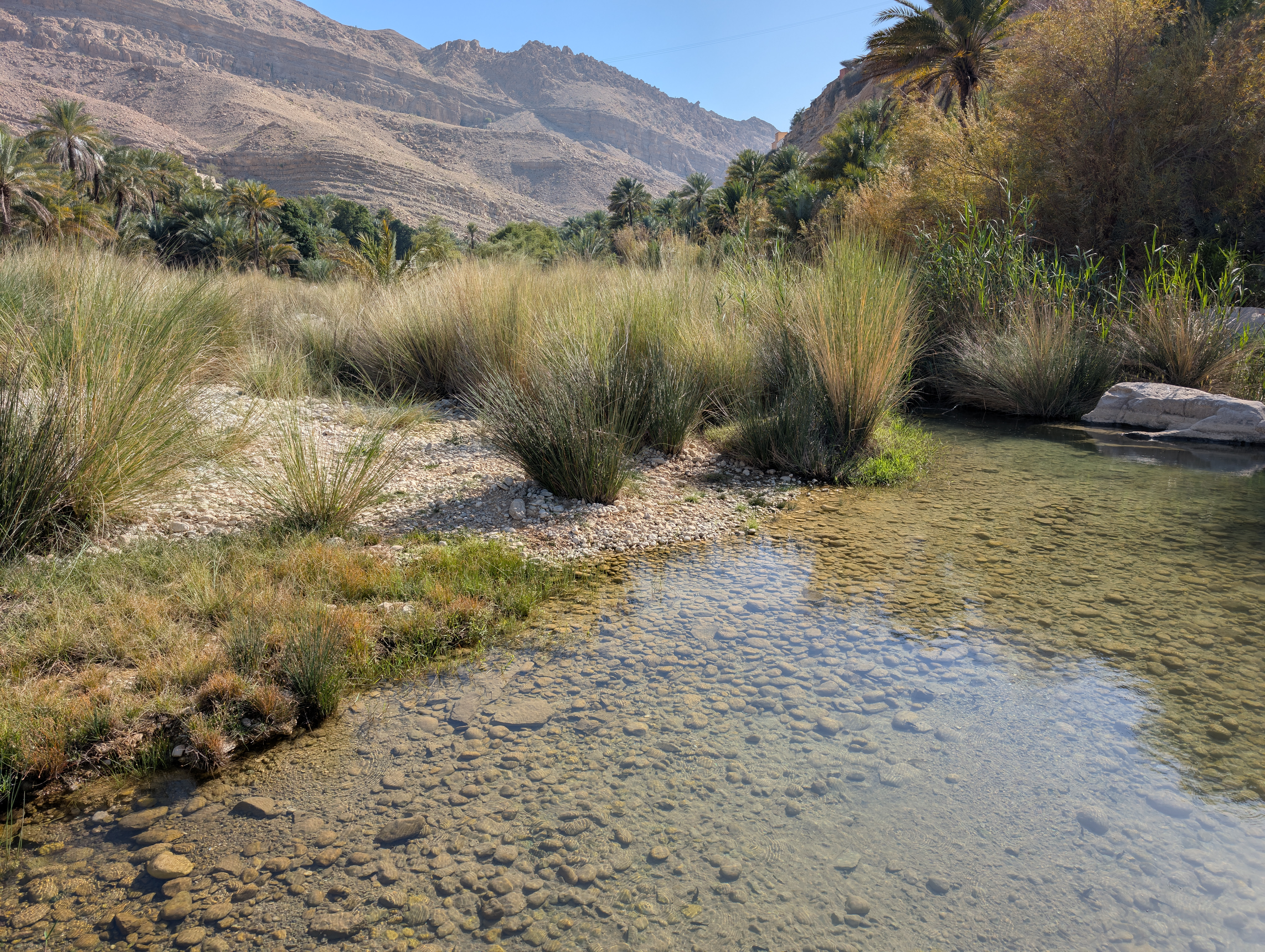
Juncus rigidus in riparian habitat, Oman

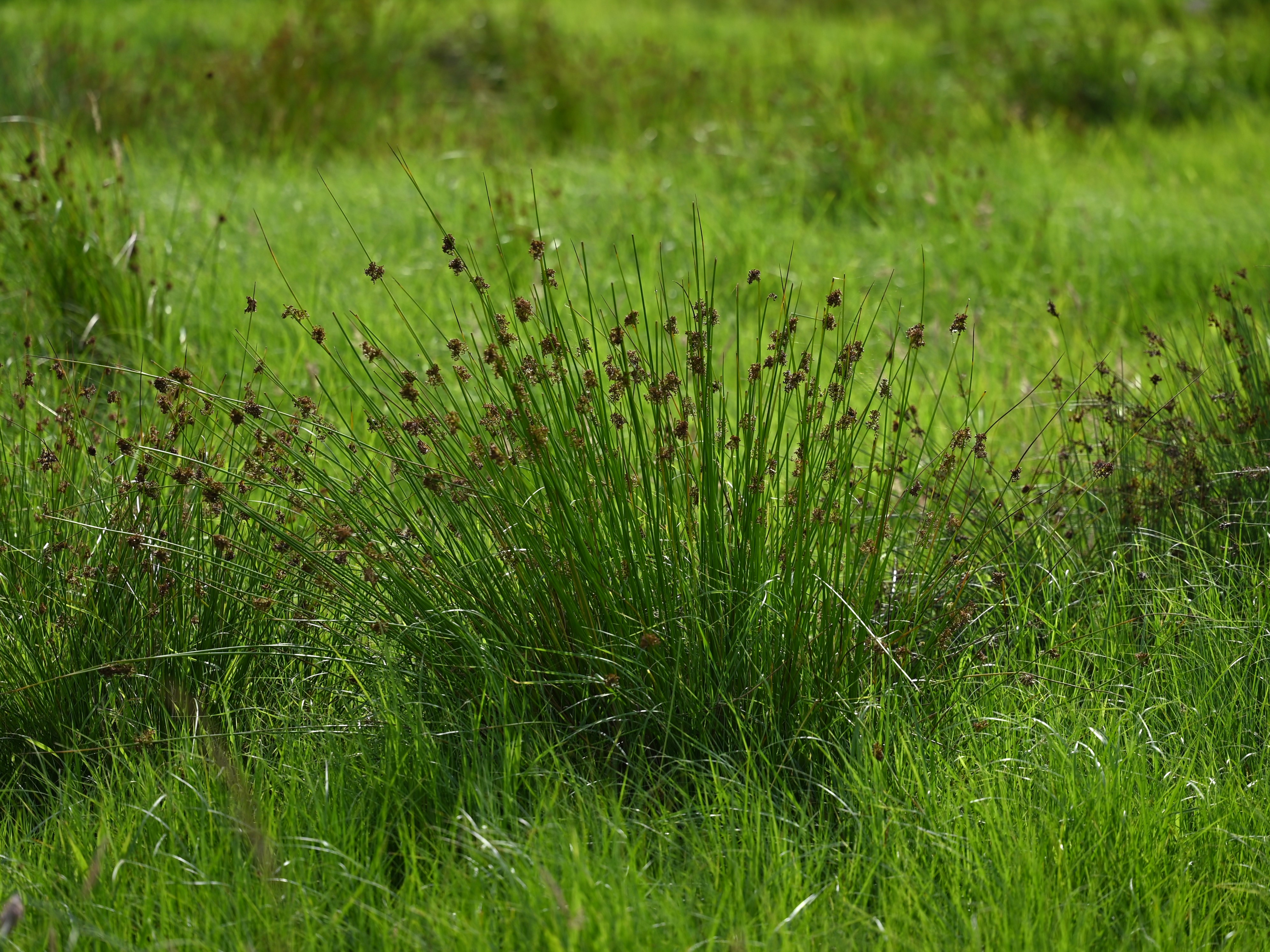
Juncus effusus in grassland habitat, Poland

== Fossil record ==
Several fossil fruits of a Juncus species have been described from middle Miocene strata of the Fasterholt area near Silkeborg in Central Jutland, Denmark.

== Uses ==
Species of genus Juncus are used by cultures around the world for various purposes. The fibrous stems lend themselves to making cordage, and cultures including indigenous peoples of California, South Africa, the Karabakh region, and pre-industrial Scandinavia have used this material to make baskets and candle wicks. There are also potential medical uses for Juncus, with both traditional medicinal uses from China and indigenous Americans as well as findings in modern medical science.

== Classification ==
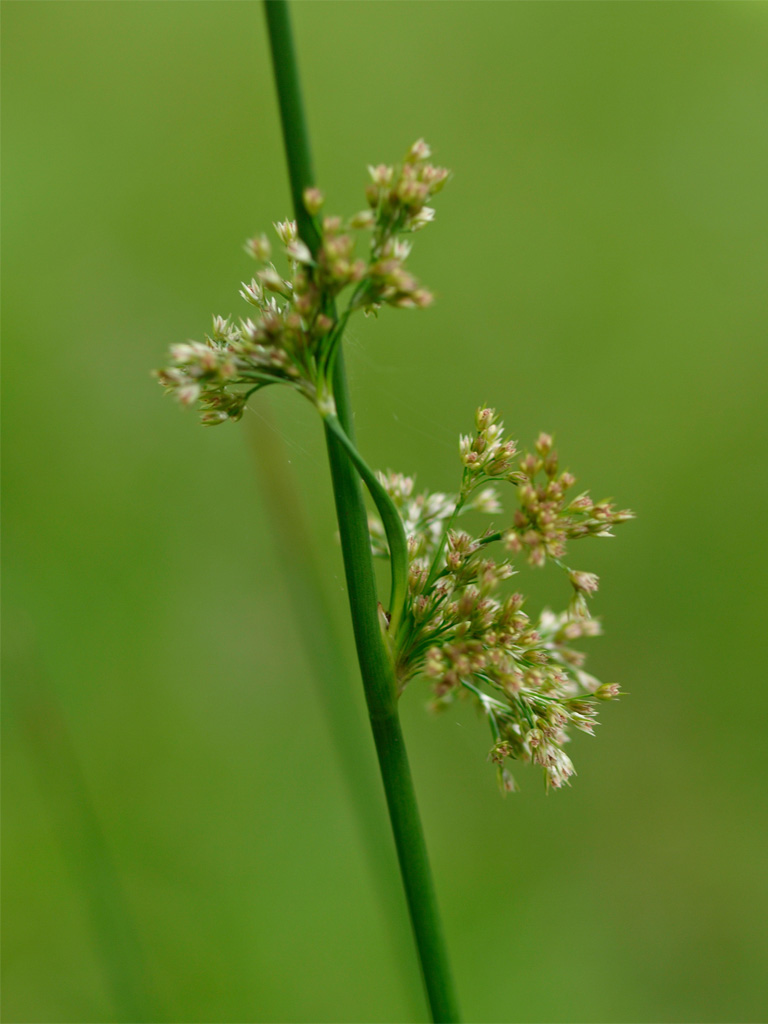
In Juncus effusus (and other species in J. sect. Juncotypus), the bract appears as a continuation of the stem, and the inflorescence appears lateral.

The genus Juncus was first named by Carl Linnaeus in his 1753 Species Plantarum. The type species of the genus was designated by Frederick Vernon Coville, who in 1913 chose the first species in Linnaeus' account, Juncus acutus. Juncus can be divided into two major groups, one group with cymose inflorescences that include bracteoles, and one with racemose inflorescences with no bracteoles.

In 2013 the genus Oreojuncus was separated from Juncus. In 2022 Viktorie Brožová et al. published a phylogenetic analysis of the cyperids (families Juncaceae, Cyperaceae, and Thurniaceae) which found Juncus to be paraphyletic, and the authors proposed that six new genera, Alpinojuncus, Agathryon, Australojuncus, Boreojuncus, Juncinella, and Verojuncus, be split from Juncus. As of July 2025 Plants of the World Online accepts Juncinella but treats the others as synonyms of Juncus.

The genus is divided into the following subgenera and sections:

- Juncus subg. Juncus
  - sect. Juncus
  - sect. Graminei (Engelm.) Engelm.
  - sect. Caespitosi Cout.
  - sect. Stygiopsis Kuntze
  - sect. Ozophyllum Dumort.
  - sect. Iridifolii Snogerup & Kirschner
- Juncus subg. Poiophylli Buchenau
  - sect. Tenageia Dumort.
  - sect. Steirochloa Griseb.
  - sect. Juncotypus Dumort.
  - sect. Forskalina Kuntze

=== Species ===
Selected Juncus species

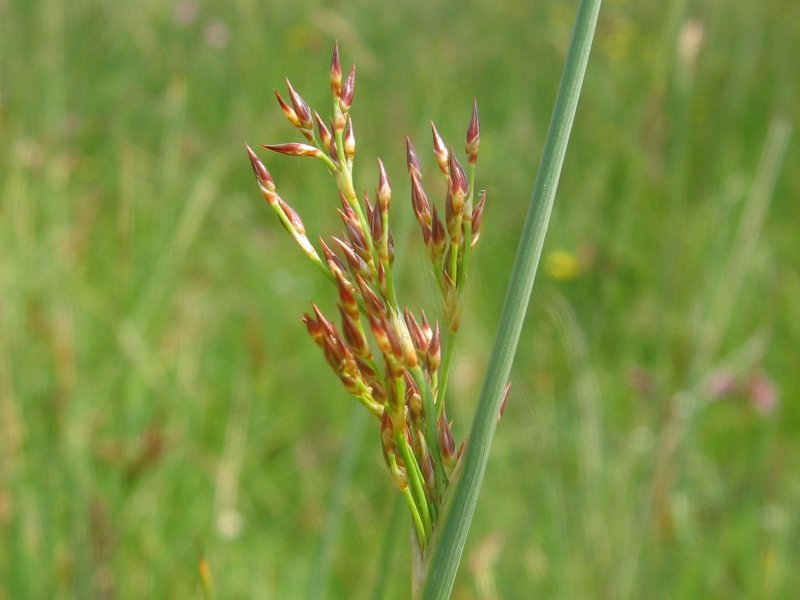
J. inflexus

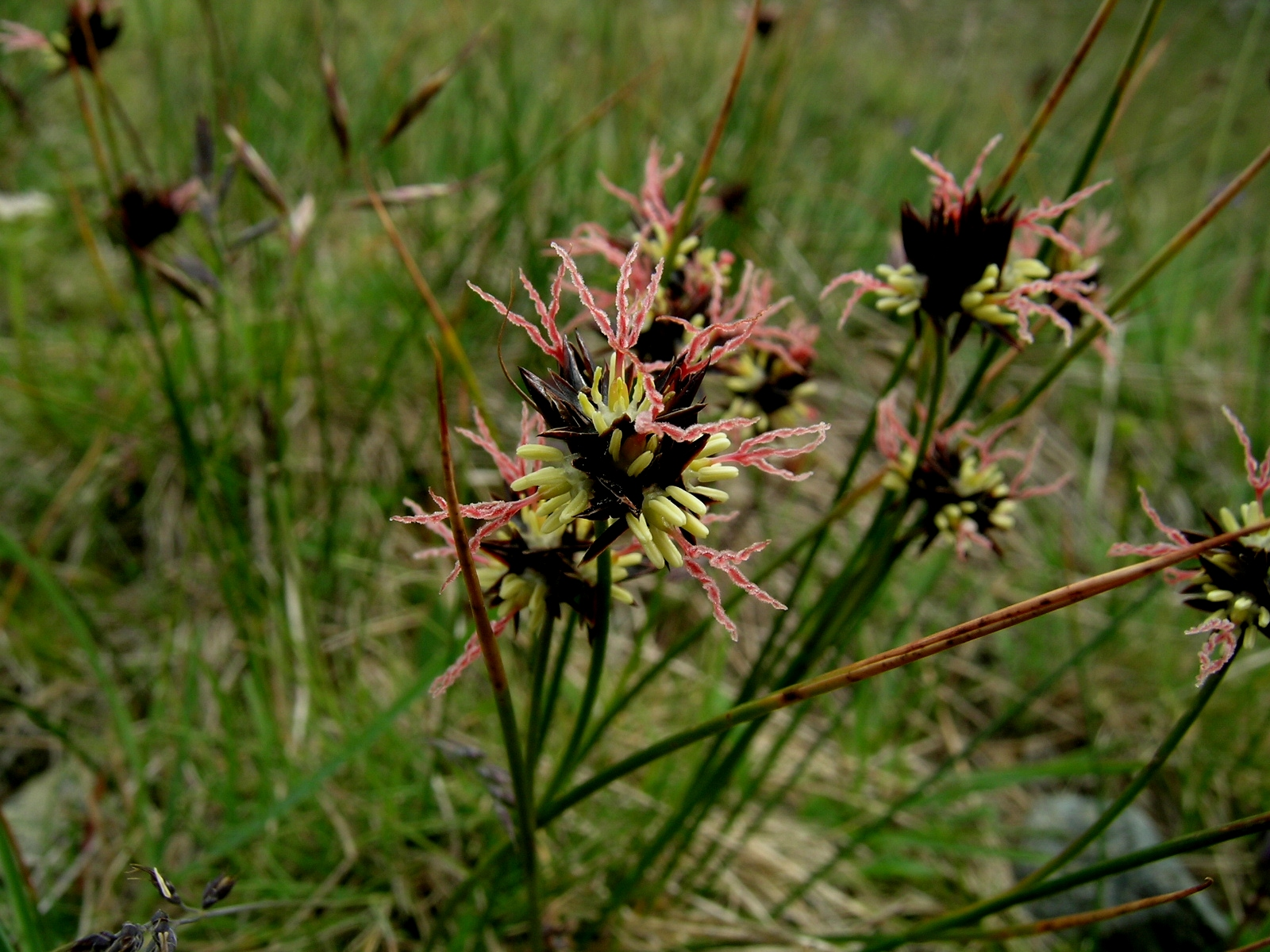
J. jacquinii

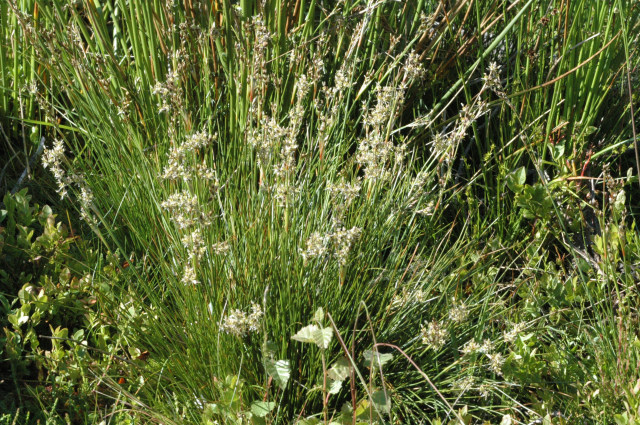
J. squarrosus

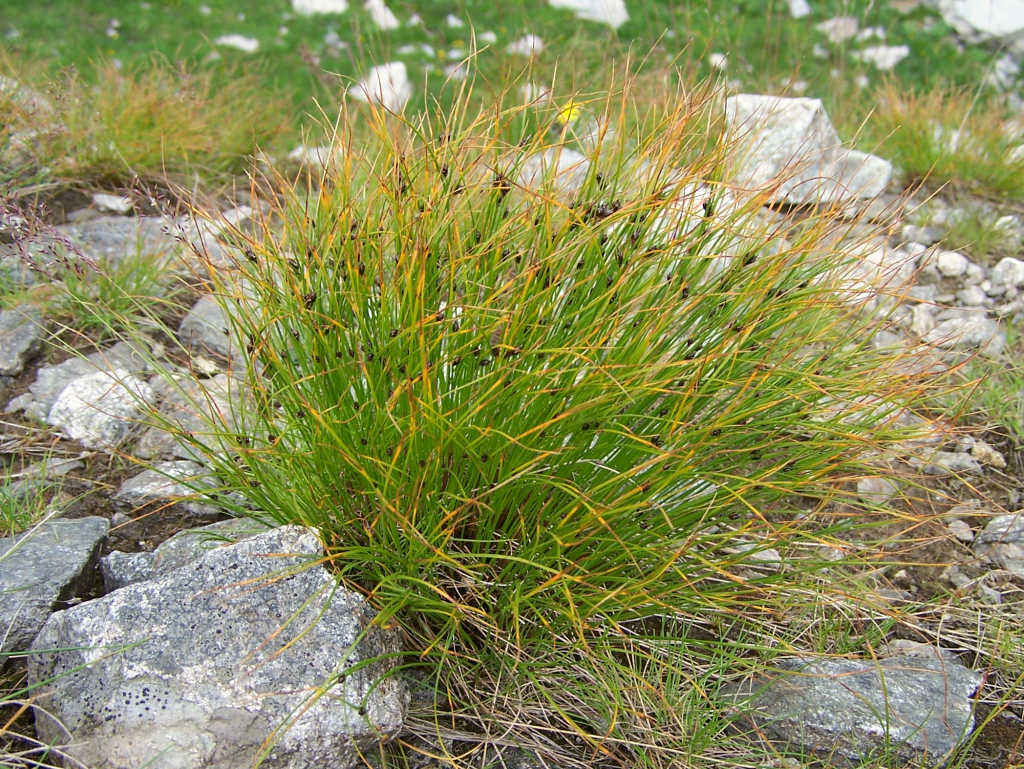
J. trifidus

As of July 2025, Plants of the World Online accepts 342 species:

- Juncus acuminatus Michx.
- Juncus acutiflorus Ehrh. ex Hoffm.
- Juncus acutiusculus Charit.
- Juncus acutus L.
- Juncus aemulans Liebm.
- Juncus alatus Franch. & Sav.
- Juncus alexandri L.A.S.Johnson
- Juncus allioides Franch.
- Juncus alpigenus K.Koch
- Juncus × alpiniformis Fernald
- Juncus alpinoarticulatus Chaix
- Juncus amabilis Edgar
- Juncus amplifolius A.Camus
- Juncus amplus Charit.
- Juncus amuricus (Maxim.) V.I.Krecz. & Gontsch.
- Juncus anatolicus Snogerup
- Juncus anceps Laharpe
- Juncus andersonii Buchenau
- Juncus andinus Balslev
- Juncus antarcticus Hook.f.
- Juncus anthelatus (Wiegand) R.E.Brooks & Whittem.
- Juncus arcticus Willd.
- Juncus aridicola L.A.S.Johnson
- Juncus articulatus L.
- Juncus astreptus L.A.S.Johnson
- Juncus atratus Krock.
- Juncus australis Hook.f.
- Juncus austrobrasiliensis Balslev
- Juncus baekdusanensis M.Kim
- Juncus balticus Willd.
- Juncus bassianus L.A.S.Johnson
- Juncus batrachium Veldkamp
- Juncus benghalensis Kunth
- Juncus beringensis Buchenau
- Juncus biflorus Elliott
- Juncus biglumis L.
- Juncus biglumoides H.Hara
- Juncus bolanderi Engelm.
- Juncus brachycarpus Engelm.
- Juncus brachycephalus (Engelm.) Buchenau
- Juncus brachyphyllus Wiegand
- Juncus brachyspathus Maxim.
- Juncus brachystigma Sam.
- Juncus brasiliensis Breistr.
- Juncus brevibracteus L.A.S.Johnson
- Juncus brevicaudatus (Engelm.) Fernald
- Juncus breviculmis Balslev
- Juncus breweri Engelm.
- Juncus × brueggeri Domin
- Juncus bryoides F.J.Herm.
- Juncus bryophilus W.W.Sm.
- Juncus bufonius L.
- Juncus bulbosus L.
- Juncus burkartii Barros
- Juncus caesariensis Coville
- Juncus caespiticius E.Mey.
- Juncus canadensis J.Gay ex Laharpe
- Juncus capensis Thunb.
- Juncus capillaceus Lam.
- Juncus capillaris F.J.Herm.
- Juncus castaneus Sm.
- Juncus cephalostigma Sam.
- Juncus chiapasensis Balslev
- Juncus chlorocephalus Engelm.
- Juncus chrysocarpus Buchenau
- Juncus clarkei Buchenau
- Juncus compressus Jacq.
- Juncus concinnus D.Don
- Juncus concolor Sam.
- Juncus confusus Coville
- Juncus conglomeratus L.
- Juncus continuus L.A.S.Johnson
- Juncus cooperi Engelm.
- Juncus cordobensis Barros
- Juncus coriaceus Mack.
- Juncus × correctus Steud.
- Juncus covillei Piper
- Juncus crassistylus A.Camus
- Juncus crispus Charit.
- Juncus curtisiae L.A.S.Johnson
- Juncus curvatus Buchenau
- Juncus cyperoides Laharpe
- Juncus debilis A.Gray
- Juncus decipiens (Buchenau) Nakai
- Juncus × degenianus Boros
- Juncus densiflorus Kunth
- Juncus deosaicus Noltie
- Juncus diastrophanthus Buchenau
- Juncus dichotomus Elliott
- Juncus diemii Barros
- Juncus diffusissimus Buckley
- Juncus × diffusus Hoppe
- Juncus digitatus C.W.Witham & Zika
- Juncus distegus Edgar
- Juncus dolichanthus L.A.S.Johnson
- Juncus dongchuanensis K.F.Wu
- Juncus × donyanae Fern.-Carv.
- Juncus dregeanus Kunth
- Juncus drummondii E.Mey.
- Juncus dubius Engelm.
- Juncus dudleyi Wiegand
- Juncus dulongjiongensis Novikov
- Juncus durus L.A.S.Johnson & K.L.Wilson
- Juncus duthiei (C.B.Clarke) Noltie
- Juncus ebracteatus E.Mey.
- Juncus echinocephalus Balslev
- Juncus ecuadoriensis Balslev
- Juncus edgariae L.A.S.Johnson & K.L.Wilson
- Juncus effusus L.
- Juncus elbrusicus Galushko
- Juncus elliottii Chapm.
- Juncus elongatus Charit.
- Juncus emmanuelis A.Fern. & J.G.García
- Juncus engleri Buchenau
- Juncus ensifolius Wikstr.
- Juncus equisetinus Proskur.
- Juncus ernesti-barrosi Barros
- Juncus exiguus (Fernald & Wiegand) Lint ex Snogerup & P.F.Zika
- Juncus exsertus Buchenau
- Juncus falcatus E.Mey.
- Juncus × fallax Trab.
- Juncus fascinatus (M.C.Johnst.) W.M.Knapp
- Juncus fastigiatus Charit.
- Juncus fauriei H.Lév. & Vaniot
- Juncus fauriensis Buchenau
- Juncus fernandez-carvajaliae Romero Zarco & Arán
- Juncus filicaulis Buchenau
- Juncus filiformis L.
- Juncus filipendulus Buckley
- Juncus fimbristyloides Noltie
- Juncus firmus L.A.S.Johnson
- Juncus flavidus L.A.S.Johnson
- Juncus fockei Buchenau
- Juncus foliosus Desf.
- Juncus fominii Zoz
- Juncus fontanesii J.Gay ex Laharpe
- Juncus fugongensis S.Y.Bao
- Juncus × fulvescens Fernald
- Juncus ganeshii Miyam. & H.Ohba
- Juncus georgianus Coville
- Juncus gerardi Loisel.
- Juncus giganteus Sam.
- Juncus glaucoturgidus Noltie
- Juncus gonggae Miyam. & H.Ohba
- Juncus × gracilescens F.J.Herm. ex Wadmond
- Juncus gracilicaulis A.Camus
- Juncus gracillimus (Buchenau) V.I.Krecz. & Gontsch.
- Juncus grandiflorus L.f.
- Juncus greenei Oakes & Tuck.
- Juncus gregiflorus L.A.S.Johnson
- Juncus grisebachii Buchenau
- Juncus guadeloupensis Buchenau & Urb.
- Juncus gubanovii Novikov
- Juncus gymnocarpus Coville
- Juncus haenkei E.Mey.
- Juncus hallii Engelm.
- Juncus harae Miyam. & H.Ohba
- Juncus heldreichianus T.Marsson ex Parl.
- Juncus hemiendytus F.J.Herm.
- Juncus heptopotamicus V.I.Krecz. & Gontsch.
- Juncus hesperius (Piper) Lint
- Juncus heterophyllus Dufour
- Juncus himalensis Klotzsch
- Juncus holoschoenus R.Br.
- Juncus homalocaulis F.Muell. ex Benth.
- Juncus hondurensis Proćków
- Juncus hookeridis Steud.
- Juncus howellii F.J.Herm.
- Juncus hybridus Brot.
- Juncus hydrophilus Noltie
- Juncus imbricatus Laharpe
- Juncus inflexus L.
- Juncus ingens N.A.Wakef.
- Juncus interior Wiegand
- Juncus × inundatus Drejer
- Juncus jacquinii L.
- Juncus jaxarticus V.I.Krecz. & Gontsch.
- Juncus jinpingensis S.Y.Bao
- Juncus kelloggii Engelm.
- Juncus khasiensis Buchenau
- Juncus kingii Rendle
- Juncus kleinii Barros
- Juncus krameri Franch. & Sav.
- Juncus kraussii Hochst.
- Juncus kuohii M.J.Jung
- Juncus laccatus P.F.Zika
- Juncus laeviusculus L.A.S.Johnson
- Juncus lancangensis Y.Y.Qian
- Juncus × lancastriensis Stace
- Juncus × langii Erdner
- Juncus leiospermus F.J.Herm.
- Juncus × lemieuxii B.Boivin
- Juncus leptospermus Buchenau
- Juncus lesueurii Bol.
- Juncus leucanthus Royle ex D.Don
- Juncus leucomelas Royle ex D.Don
- Juncus liebmannii J.F.Macbr.
- Juncus littoralis C.A.Mey.
- Juncus llanquihuensis Barros
- Juncus lomatophyllus Spreng.
- Juncus longiflorus (A.Camus) Noltie
- Juncus longii Fernald
- Juncus longirostris Kuvaev
- Juncus longistamineus A.Camus
- Juncus longistylis Torr.
- Juncus luciensis Ertter
- Juncus luzuliformis Franch.
- Juncus macrandrus Coville
- Juncus macrantherus V.I.Krecz. & Gontsch.
- Juncus macrophyllus Coville
- Juncus magellanicus Lam.
- Juncus marginatus Rostk.
- Juncus maritimus Lam.
- Juncus maroccanus Kirschner
- Juncus maximowiczii Buchenau
- Juncus megacephalus M.A.Curtis
- Juncus megalophyllus S.Y.Bao
- Juncus meianthus L.A.S.Johnson ex K.L.Wilson
- Juncus membranaceus Royle
- Juncus mertensianus Bong.
- Juncus micranthus Schrad. ex E.Mey.
- Juncus microcephalus Kunth
- Juncus milashanensis A.M.Lu & Z.Y.Zhang
- Juncus militaris Bigelow
- Juncus minimus Buchenau
- Juncus minutulus (Albert & Jahand.) Prain
- Juncus modicus N.E.Br.
- Juncus mogadorensis (H.Lindb.) A.W.Hill
- Juncus mollis L.A.S.Johnson
- Juncus × montellii Vierh.
- Juncus × montserratensis Marcet
- Juncus × murbeckii Sagorski
- Juncus mustangensis Miyam. & H.Ohba
- Juncus × neglectus Charit.
- Juncus nepalicus Miyam. & H.Ohba
- Juncus nevadensis S.Watson
- Juncus nodatus Coville
- Juncus × nodosiformis Fernald
- Juncus nodosus L.
- Juncus novae-zelandiae Hook.f.
- Juncus nupela Veldkamp
- Juncus oblongus Charit.
- Juncus × obotritorum Rothm.
- Juncus obtusiusculus Charit.
- Juncus occidentalis (Colville) Wiegand
- Juncus ochraceus Buchenau
- Juncus ochrocoleus L.A.S.Johnson
- Juncus orchonicus Novikov
- Juncus × oronensis Fernald
- Juncus orthophyllus Coville
- Juncus oxycarpus E.Mey. ex Kunth
- Juncus oxymeris Engelm.
- Juncus pallescens Lam.
- Juncus pallidus R.Br.
- Juncus paludosus E.L.Bridges & Orzell
- Juncus papillosus Franch. & Sav.
- Juncus parryi Engelm.
- Juncus patens E.Mey.
- Juncus pauciflorus R.Br.
- Juncus pelocarpus E.Mey.
- Juncus perpusillus Sam.
- Juncus persicus Boiss.
- Juncus pervetus Fernald
- Juncus petrophilus Miyam.
- Juncus phaeanthus L.A.S.Johnson
- Juncus phaeocephalus Engelm.
- Juncus planifolius R.Br.
- Juncus polyanthemus Buchenau
- Juncus polycephalos Michx.
- Juncus potaninii Buchenau
- Juncus prismatocarpus R.Br.
- Juncus procerus E.Mey.
- Juncus prominens (Buchenau) Miyabe & Kudô
- Juncus przewalskii Buchenau
- Juncus psammophilus L.A.S.Johnson
- Juncus punctorius L.f.
- Juncus pusillus Buchenau
- Juncus pygmaeus Rich. ex Thuill.
- Juncus pylaei Laharpe
- Juncus radula Buchenau
- Juncus ramboi Barros
- Juncus ranarius Songeon & E.P.Perrier
- Juncus ratkowskyanus L.A.S.Johnson
- Juncus rechingeri Snogerup
- Juncus rectus Charit.
- Juncus regelii Buchenau
- Juncus remotiflorus L.A.S.Johnson
- Juncus repens Michx.
- Juncus requienii Parl.
- Juncus revolutus R.Br.
- Juncus rigidus Desf.
- Juncus riparius Charit.
- Juncus roemerianus Scheele
- Juncus rohtangensis Goel & Aswal
- Juncus × ruhmeri Asch. & Graebn.
- Juncus × sallandiae Corporaal & Schaminée
- Juncus salsuginosus Turcz. ex C.A.Mey.
- Juncus sandwithii Lourteig
- Juncus sarophorus L.A.S.Johnson
- Juncus saximontanus A.Nelson
- Juncus scheuchzerioides Gaudich.
- Juncus scirpoides Lam.
- Juncus scrobilatus Charit.
- Juncus secundus P.Beauv. ex Poir.
- Juncus semisolidus L.A.S.Johnson
- Juncus setchuensis Buchenau
- Juncus sherei Miyam. & H.Ohba
- Juncus sikkimensis Hook.f.
- Juncus snowii W.M.Knapp & R.Carter
- Juncus socotranus (Buchenau) Snogerup
- Juncus sonderianus Buchenau
- Juncus soranthus Schrenk
- Juncus sorrentinoi Parl.
- Juncus sparganiifolius Boiss. & Kotschy ex Buchenau
- Juncus spectabilis Rendle
- Juncus sphacelatus Decne.
- Juncus sphaerocarpus Nees
- Juncus spumosus Noltie
- Juncus squarrosus L.
- Juncus stipulatus Nees & Meyen
- Juncus striatus Schousb. ex E.Mey.
- Juncus × stuckeyi Reinking
- Juncus stygius L.
- Juncus × subatratus Charit.
- Juncus subcaudatus (Engelm.) Coville & S.F.Blake
- Juncus subglaucus L.A.S.Johnson
- Juncus subnodulosus Schrank
- Juncus subsecundus N.A.Wakef.
- Juncus subtilis E.Mey.
- Juncus subulatus Forssk.
- Juncus subulitepalus Balslev
- Juncus supiniformis Engelm.
- Juncus taonanensis Satake & Kitag.
- Juncus tenageia Ehrh. ex L.f.
- Juncus tenuis Willd.
- Juncus texanus (Engelm.) Coville
- Juncus textilis Buchenau
- Juncus thomasii Ten.
- Juncus thompsonianus L.A.S.Johnson
- Juncus thomsonii Buchenau
- Juncus tiehmii Ertter
- Juncus tingitanus Maire & Weiller
- Juncus tobdeniorum Noltie
- Juncus torreyi Coville
- Juncus trachyphyllus Miyam. & H.Ohba
- Juncus trichophyllus W.W.Sm.
- Juncus triformis Engelm.
- Juncus triglumis L.
- Juncus trigonocarpus Steud.
- Juncus trilocularis Zika
- Juncus turkestanicus V.I.Krecz. & Gontsch.
- Juncus uncialis Greene
- Juncus uniflorus W.W.Sm.
- Juncus uruguensis Griseb.
- Juncus usitatus L.A.S.Johnson
- Juncus vaginatus R.Br.
- Juncus × valbrayi H.Lév.
- Juncus validus Coville
- Juncus valvatus Link
- Juncus vaseyi Engelm.
- Juncus venturianus Castillón
- Juncus virens Buchenau
- Juncus wallichianus J.Gay ex Laharpe
- Juncus xiphioides E.Mey.
- Juncus yui S.Y.Bao

=== Formerly placed here ===
- Juncinella capitata (Weigel) Záv.Drábk. & Proćków (as Juncus capitatus Weigel)
- Juncinella cephalotes (Thunb.) Záv.Drábk. & Proćków (as Juncus cephalotes Thunb.)
- Juncinella obliqua (Adamson) Záv.Drábk. & Proćków (as Juncus obliquus Adamson)
- Juncinella picta (Steud.) Záv.Drábk. & Proćków (as Juncus pictus Steud.)
- Juncinella rupestris (Kunth) Záv.Drábk. & Proćków (as Juncus rupestris Kunth)
- Juncinella scabriuscula (Kunth) Záv.Drábk. & Proćków (as Juncus scabriusculus Kunth)
- Juncinella stenopetala (Adamson) Záv.Drábk. & Proćków (as Juncus stenopetalus Adamson)
