= List of Canadian plants by family I–K =

Main page: List of Canadian plants by family

The following families of vascular plants are listed as occurring in Canada:

For mosses of Canada, see:

== Iridaceae ==
- Iris brevicaulis — Lamance iris
- Iris lacustris — dwarf lake iris
- Iris missouriensis — western blue iris
- Iris prismatica — slender blueflag
- Iris setosa — beach-head iris
- Iris virginica — Virginia blueflag
- Iris x robusta
- Iris x sancti-cyrii — St. Cyr's iris
- Olsynium douglasii — Douglas' blue-eyed-grass
- Sisyrinchium albidum — white blue-eyed-grass
- Sisyrinchium angustifolium — pointed blue-eyed-grass
- Sisyrinchium atlanticum — eastern blue-eyed-grass
- Sisyrinchium bellum — California blue-eyed-grass
- Sisyrinchium californicum — golden blue-eyed-grass
- Sisyrinchium campestre — prairie blue-eyed-grass
- Sisyrinchium fuscatum — coastal plain blue-eyed-grass
- Sisyrinchium idahoense — Idaho blue-eyed-grass
- Sisyrinchium littorale — Alaska blue-eyed-grass
- Sisyrinchium montanum — strict blue-eyed-grass
- Sisyrinchium mucronatum — Michaux's blue-eyed-grass
- Sisyrinchium septentrionale — northern blue-eyed-grass

== Isoetaceae ==
- Isoetes acadiensis — Acadian quillwort
- Isoetes bolanderi — Bolander's quillwort
- Isoetes echinospora — spinyspore quillwort
- Isoetes engelmannii — Appalachian quillwort
- Isoetes howellii — Howell's quillwort
- Isoetes lacustris — western lake quillwort
- Isoetes macrospora — lake quillwort
- Isoetes maritima — maritime quillwort
- Isoetes nuttallii — Nuttall's quillwort
- Isoetes occidentalis — western quillwort
- Isoetes prototypus — spike quillwort
- Isoetes riparia — riverbank quillwort
- Isoetes tuckermanii — Tuckerman's quillwort
- Isoetes x dodgei — Dodge's quillwort
- Isoetes x eatonii — Eaton's quillwort
- Isoetes x harveyi — Harvey's quillwort
- Isoetes x heterospora
- Isoetes x hickeyi — Hickey's quillwort
- Isoetes x truncata — truncate quillwort

== Jubulaceae ==
- Frullania bolanderi
- Frullania brittoniae
- Frullania eboracensis
- Frullania inflata
- Frullania oakesiana
- Frullania selwyniana
- Frullania tamarisci

== Juglandaceae ==
- Carya alba — mockernut hickory
- Carya cordiformis — bitternut hickory
- Carya glabra — sweet pignut hickory
- Carya laciniosa — big shellbark hickory
- Carya ovalis — red hickory
- Carya ovata — shagbark hickory
- Carya x laneyi — Laney's hickory
- Juglans cinerea — butternut
- Juglans nigra — black walnut

== Juncaceae ==
- Juncus acuminatus — sharpfruit rush
- Juncus acutiflorus — sharpflower rush
- Juncus albescens — northern white rush
- Juncus alpinoarticulatus — northern green rush
- Juncus ambiguus — seaside rush
- Juncus arcticus — arctic rush
- Juncus articulatus — jointed rush
- Juncus balticus — Baltic rush
- Juncus biflorus — grass-leaved rush
- Juncus biglumis — two-flower rush
- Juncus bolanderi — Bolander's rush
- Juncus brachycarpus — shortfruit rush
- Juncus brachycephalus — smallhead rush
- Juncus brevicaudatus — narrowpanicle rush
- Juncus breweri — Brewer's rush
- Juncus bufonius — toad rush
- Juncus bulbosus — bulbous rush
- Juncus caesariensis — New Jersey rush
- Juncus canadensis — Canada rush
- Juncus castaneus — chestnut rush
- Juncus confusus — Colorado rush
- Juncus covillei — Coville's rush
- Juncus drummondii — Drummond's rush
- Juncus dudleyi — Dudley's rush
- Juncus effusus — soft rush
- Juncus ensifolius — three-stamened rush
- Juncus falcatus — sickleleaf rush
- Juncus filiformis — thread rush
- Juncus gerardii — black-grass rush
- Juncus greenei — Greene's rush
- Juncus haenkei — Thaddäus Haenke's rush
- Juncus interior — inland rush
- Juncus kelloggii — Kellogg's rush
- Juncus lesueurii — salt rush
- Juncus longistylis — long-styled rush
- Juncus marginatus — grassleaf rush
- Juncus mertensianus — Mertens' rush
- Juncus militaris — bayonet rush
- Juncus nevadensis — Sierran rush
- Juncus nodosus — knotted rush
- Juncus occidentalis — western rush
- Juncus oxymeris — pointed rush
- Juncus parryi — Parry's rush
- Juncus pelocarpus — brownfruit rush
- Juncus regelii — Regel's rush
- Juncus saximontanus — Rocky Mountain rush
- Juncus secundus — secund rush
- Juncus stygius — Moor rush
- Juncus subcaudatus — woodland rush
- Juncus subtilis — creeping rush
- Juncus supiniformis — hairyleaf rush
- Juncus tenuis — slender rush
- Juncus torreyi — Torrey's rush
- Juncus tracyi — Tracy's rush
- Juncus trifidus — highland rush
- Juncus triglumis — three-flower rush
- Juncus vaseyi — Vasey's rush
- Juncus x alpiniformis
- Juncus x fulvescens
- Juncus x gracilescens
- Juncus x lemieuxii — Lemieux's rush
- Juncus x nodosiformis
- Luzula acuminata — hairy woodrush
- Luzula alpinopilosa — alpine woodrush
- Luzula nivalis — arctic woodrush
- Luzula arcuata — curved woodrush
- Luzula campestris — common woodrush
- Luzula comosa — Pacific woodrush
- Luzula confusa — northern woodrush
- Luzula echinata — hedgehog woodrush
- Luzula glabrata — smooth woodrush
- Luzula groenlandica — Greenland woodrush
- Luzula multiflora — common woodrush
- Luzula parviflora — smallflower woodrush
- Luzula piperi — Piper's woodrush
- Luzula rufescens — hairy woodrush
- Luzula spicata — spiked woodrush
- Luzula wahlenbergii — Wahlenberg's woodrush

== Juncaginaceae ==
- Triglochin concinna — slender arrow-grass
- Triglochin gaspensis — Gaspé Peninsula arrow-grass
- Triglochin maritima — common bog arrow-grass
- Triglochin palustris — slender bog arrow-grass
- Triglochin scilloides (syn. Lilaea scilloides) — flowering quillwort

== Jungermanniaceae ==
- Anastrophyllum assimile
- Anastrophyllum helleranum
- Anastrophyllum michauxii
- Anastrophyllum minutum
- Anastrophyllum saxicola
- Anastrophyllum tenue
- Barbilophozia atlantica
- Barbilophozia attenuata
- Barbilophozia barbata
- Barbilophozia binsteadii
- Barbilophozia cavifolia
- Barbilophozia floerkei
- Barbilophozia hatcheri
- Barbilophozia kunzeana
- Barbilophozia lycopodioides
- Barbilophozia quadriloba
- Chandonanthus setiformis
- Cryptocolea imbricata
- Gymnocolea acutiloba
- Gymnocolea inflata
- Jamesoniella autumnalis
- Jungermannia atrovirens
- Jungermannia confertissima
- Jungermannia crenuliformis
- Jungermannia exsertifolia
- Jungermannia gracillima
- Jungermannia hyalina
- Jungermannia karl-muelleri
- Jungermannia leiantha
- Jungermannia obovata
- Jungermannia polaris
- Jungermannia pumila
- Jungermannia rubra
- Jungermannia sphaerocarpa
- Jungermannia subelliptica
- Lophozia alpestris
- Lophozia ascendens
- Lophozia badensis
- Lophozia bantriensis
- Lophozia bicrenata
- Lophozia capitata
- Lophozia collaris
- Lophozia excisa
- Lophozia gillmanii
- Lophozia grandiretis
- Lophozia groenlandica
- Lophozia guttulata
- Lophozia heterocolpos
- Lophozia hyperarctica
- Lophozia incisa
- Lophozia latifolia
- Lophozia laxa
- Lophozia longidens
- Lophozia obtusa
- Lophozia opacifolia
- Lophozia pellucida
- Lophozia rutheana
- Lophozia sudetica
- Lophozia ventricosa
- Lophozia wenzelii
- Mylia anomala
- Mylia taylorii
- Nardia breidleri
- Nardia geoscyphus
- Nardia insecta
- Nardia scalaris — ladder flapwort
- Tritomaria exsecta
- Tritomaria exsectiformis
- Tritomaria heterophylla
- Tritomaria polita
- Tritomaria quinquedentata
- Tritomaria scitula
