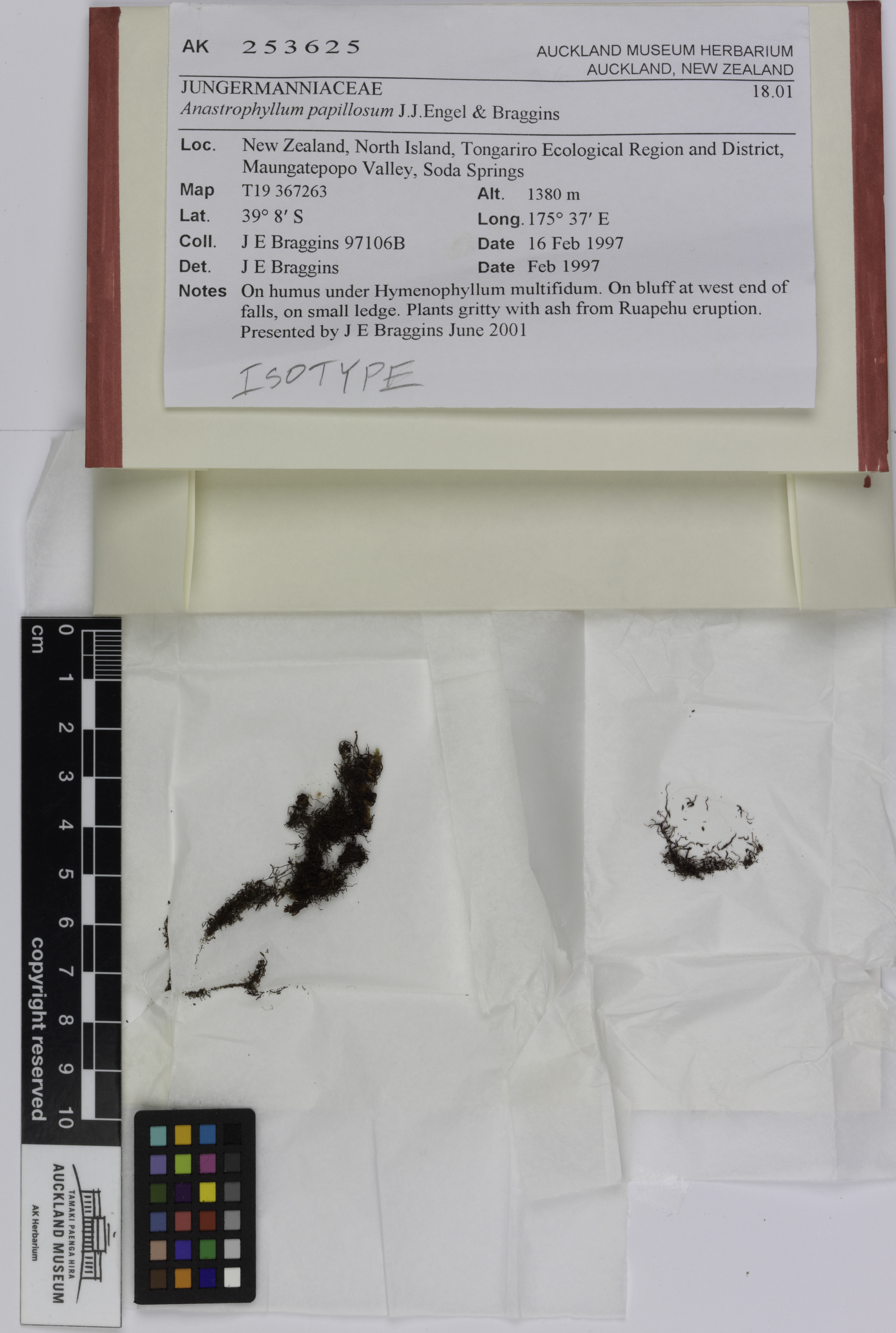
- Type specimen from the Auckland War Memorial Museum herbarium

Scientific classification
- Kingdom: Plantae
- Division: Marchantiophyta
- Class: Jungermanniopsida
- Order: Lophoziales
- Family: Anastrophyllaceae
- Genus: Schizophyllopsis
- Species: S. papillosa

Binomial name
- Schizophyllopsis papillosa (J.J.Engel & Braggins) Váňa & L.Söderstr.

Synonyms
- Anastrophyllum papillosum J.J.Engel et Braggins; Schizophyllum papillosum (J.J.Engel et Braggins.) Váňa et L.Söderstr.

= Schizophyllopsis papillosa =

Species of liverwort

Schizophyllopsis papillosa is a species of liverwort in the family Anastrophyllaceae. The species was first identified as Anastrophyllum papillosum by John J. Engel, John E. Braggins, and Rudolf M. Schuster in 1998.

== Etymology ==
The species epithet papillosa refers to the raised uneven tubercles found on the plant.

== Taxonomy ==
The species was originally described as Anastrophyllum papillosum. In 2013, when the Anastrophyllum subgenus Schizophyllum was elevated to genus status by Jiří Váňa and Lars Söderström, the species was briefly known as Schizophyllum papillosum. Due to Schizophyllum being a name for a pre-existing genus, this name was not considered legitimate and the new genus Schizophyllopsis was created. After this, the species became known as Schizophyllopsis papillosa.

== Description ==
Schizophyllopsis papillosa is stiff and wiry, and has a deep red pigment. The species is visually similar to Anastrophyllum auritum, and can be differentiated by sparse lateral intercalary branching.

== Distribution and habitat ==
Schizophyllopsis papillosa is endemic to New Zealand, with the holotype of the species occurring above 1,350 m (4,430 ft) in the vicinity of Soda Springs in Tongariro National Park. The species has been identified in alpine areas of Mount Taranaki and the Southern Alps.
