= Forêt ancienne du Lac des Neiges =

Forest ecosystem in Quebec, Canada

- IUCN category III (natural monument or feature)
- Location within Quebec
- Location: Lac-Jacques-Cartier, MRC La Côte-de-Beaupré, Capitale-Nationale, Quebec, Canada
- Coordinates: 47°28′49″N 71°01′36″W
- Established: 2005
- Administrator: Ministry of Energy and Natural Resources

The Forêt ancienne du Lac-des-Neiges (English: Lac-des-Neiges old forest) is an exceptional forest ecosystem of Quebec located in the unorganized territory of Lac-Jacques-Cartier, in the province of Quebec, Canada. It protects a fir tree black spruce located on the mountain floor aged about 200 years. It is located in the Laurentides Wildlife Reserve, near the Lac des Neiges.

== Toponymy ==
The name of the Lac-des-Neiges ancient forest comes from the lac des Neiges which is located nearby. The name of the lake appears on a 1731 father's card Pierre-Michel Laure. The name of the lake refers to the snow that persists on the tops of the surrounding mountains for much of the year.

== Geography ==
The Lac-des-Neiges Ancient Forest is located 70 kilometres (43 mi) north of Quebec, in the unorganized territory of Lac-Jacques-Cartier. It is divided into three sectors with a total of 408 hectares (1,010 acres). The soil is composed of thick till having more than 25 centimetres (9.8 in). The climate is cool and humid.

It is located in the Laurentides Wildlife Reserve.

== Flora ==
The Lac-des-Neiges old growth forest is a black spruce fir tree about 200 years (6,300 Ms). It is a forest that has not experienced any natural or anthropogenic disturbance, a rare fact because the forest north of Quebec has been exploited for more than a century. There is also the fungus Leptoporus mollis and the liverwort Anastrophyllum hellerianum which are associated with forests having large woody debris little degraded. The forest is dominated by the balsam fir (Abies balsamea). The mountain character of the forest is characterized by the presence of small trees and low density forest cover. There are also black spruce (Picea marian) and white birch (Betula papyrifer) in low density. The presence of white birch is more important in the most important windfall. The regeneration is mainly composed of balsam fir and occasionally black spruce and paper birch.

The herbaceous layer is dense and dominated by pubescent bramble (Rubus pubescens) and oak fern gymnocarp (Gymnocarpium dryopteris). The flowerbed is dominated in places by mosses Pleurozium schreberi and Hylocomium splendens.

== Appendices ==
=== Related articles ===
- Laurentides Wildlife Reserve

=== Bibliography ===
- Ministère des Ressources naturelles et de la Faune (2005). Lac-des-Neiges Old Forest (PDF). Archived from the original (PDF) on 2022-01-21..
