= Coleophora bispinatella =

Scientific classification
- Kingdom: Animalia
- Phylum: Arthropoda
- Class: Insecta
- Order: Lepidoptera
- Family: Coleophoridae
- Genus: Coleophora
- Species: C. bispinatella

Binomial name
- Coleophora bispinatella McDunnough, 1954

Species of moth

Coleophora bispinatella is a moth of the family Coleophoridae. It is found in Canada, including Nova Scotia.

The larvae feed on the seeds of Juncus canadensis. They create a trivalved, tubular silken case.
