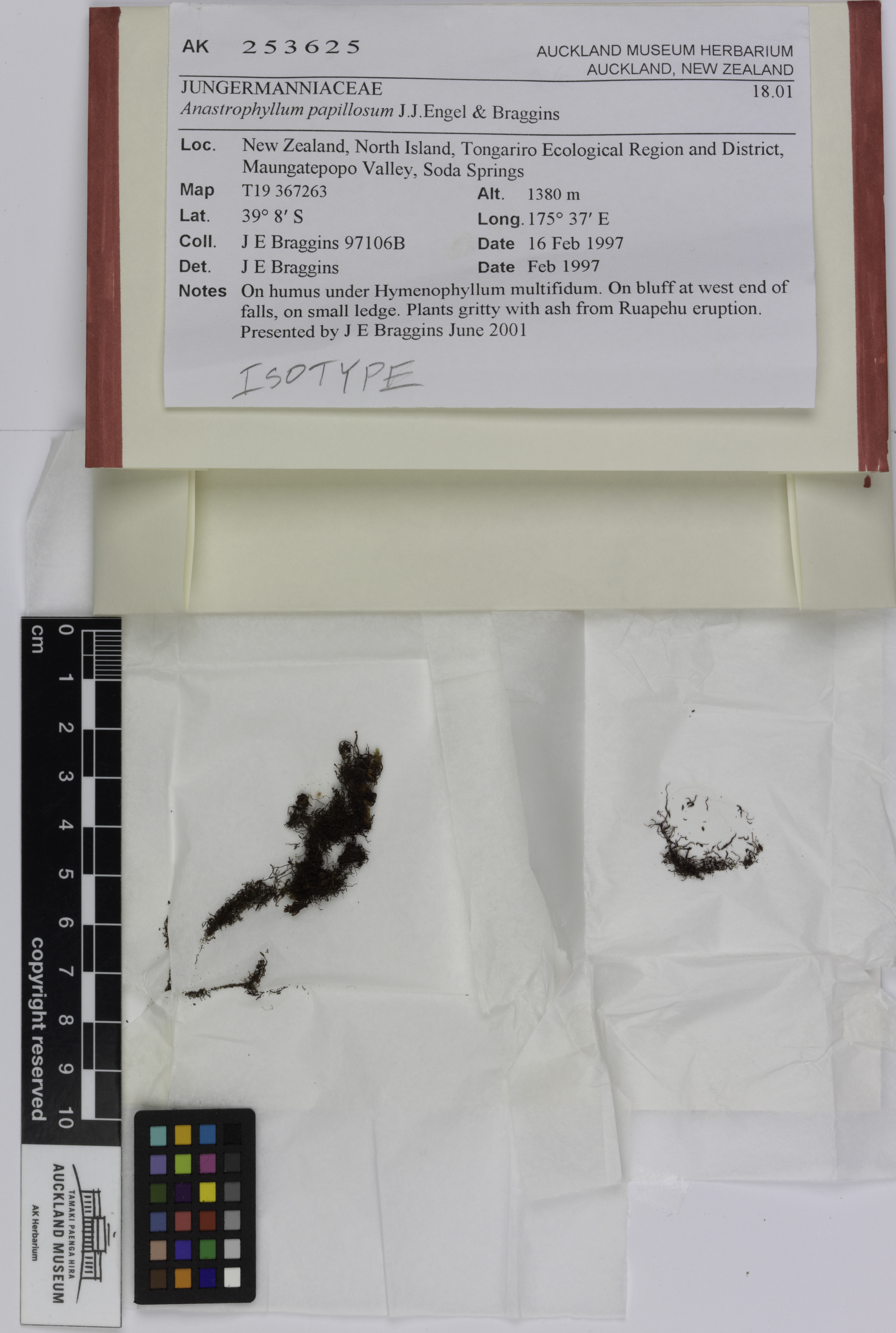
- Schizophyllopsis papillosa

Scientific classification
- Kingdom: Plantae
- Division: Marchantiophyta
- Class: Jungermanniopsida
- Order: Lophoziales
- Family: Anastrophyllaceae
- Genus: Schizophyllopsis; Váňa & L.Söderstr.

= Schizophyllopsis =

Genus of liverworts

Schizophyllopsis is a genus of liverworts belonging to the family Anastrophyllaceae. The Anastrophyllum subgenus Schizophyllum was elevated to genus status by Jiří Váňa and Lars Söderström in 2013, but Schizophyllum was already an accepted name for another genus, so the new genus Schizophyllopsis was created as a substitute.

== Species ==
As accepted by GBIF;

- Schizophyllopsis aristata (Herzog ex N.Kitag.) Váňa & L.Söderstr.
- Schizophyllopsis bidens (Reinw., Blume & Nees) Váňa & L.Söderstr.
- Schizophyllopsis lanciloba (Steph.) Váňa & L.Söderstr.
- Schizophyllopsis papillosa (J.J.Engel & Braggins) Váňa & L.Söderstr.
- Schizophyllopsis sphenoloboides (R.M.Schust.) Váňa & L.Söderstr.
