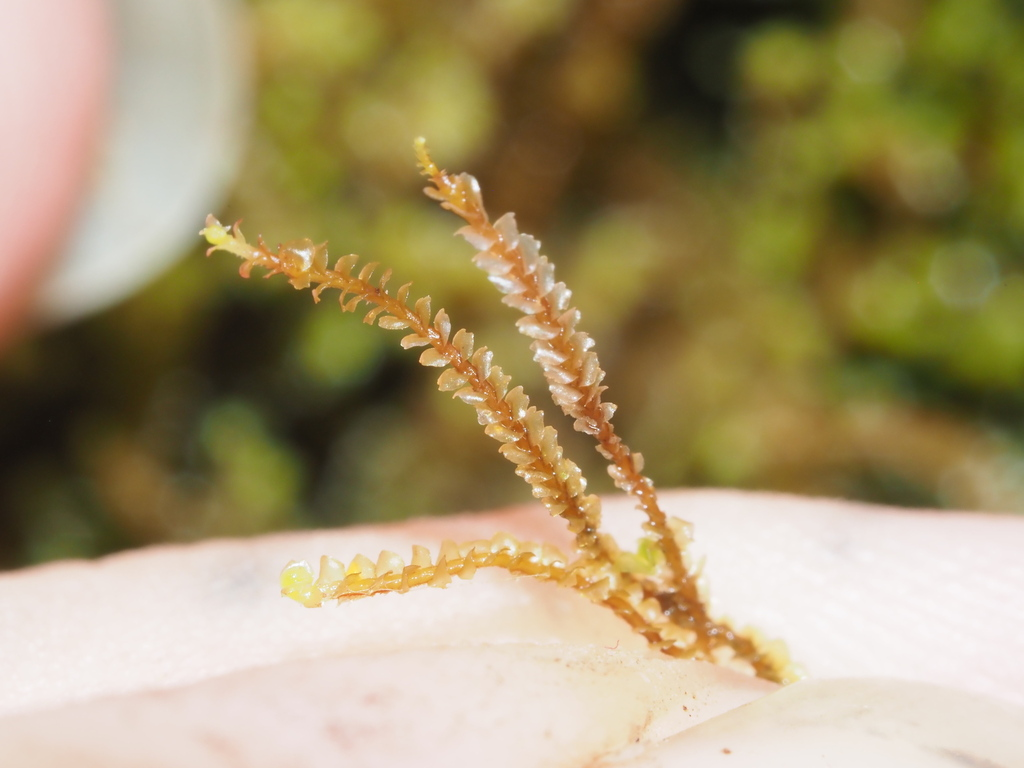

Scientific classification
- Kingdom: Plantae
- Division: Marchantiophyta
- Class: Jungermanniopsida
- Order: Lophoziales
- Family: Anastrophyllaceae
- Genus: Anastrepta
- Species: A. orcadensis

Binomial name
- Anastrepta orcadensis (Hook.) Schiffn.

= Anastrepta orcadensis =

Species of liverwort

Anastrepta orcadensis, also known as Orkney notchwort, is a species of liverwort found in the United States, Canada, and widely in Europe.

Its existence was first discovered on Ward Hill, on the island of Hoy, Orkney, Scotland by William Jackson Hooker in 1808. It is commonly found in the northern hepatic mat on heather-covered slopes, woodland floors and on scree slopes in the Highlands and occurs elsewhere on the west and north coasts of the British Isles.

In Alaska, it is most abundant on islands near the open sea and on inner islands at elevations above 300 metres (1500 ft).
