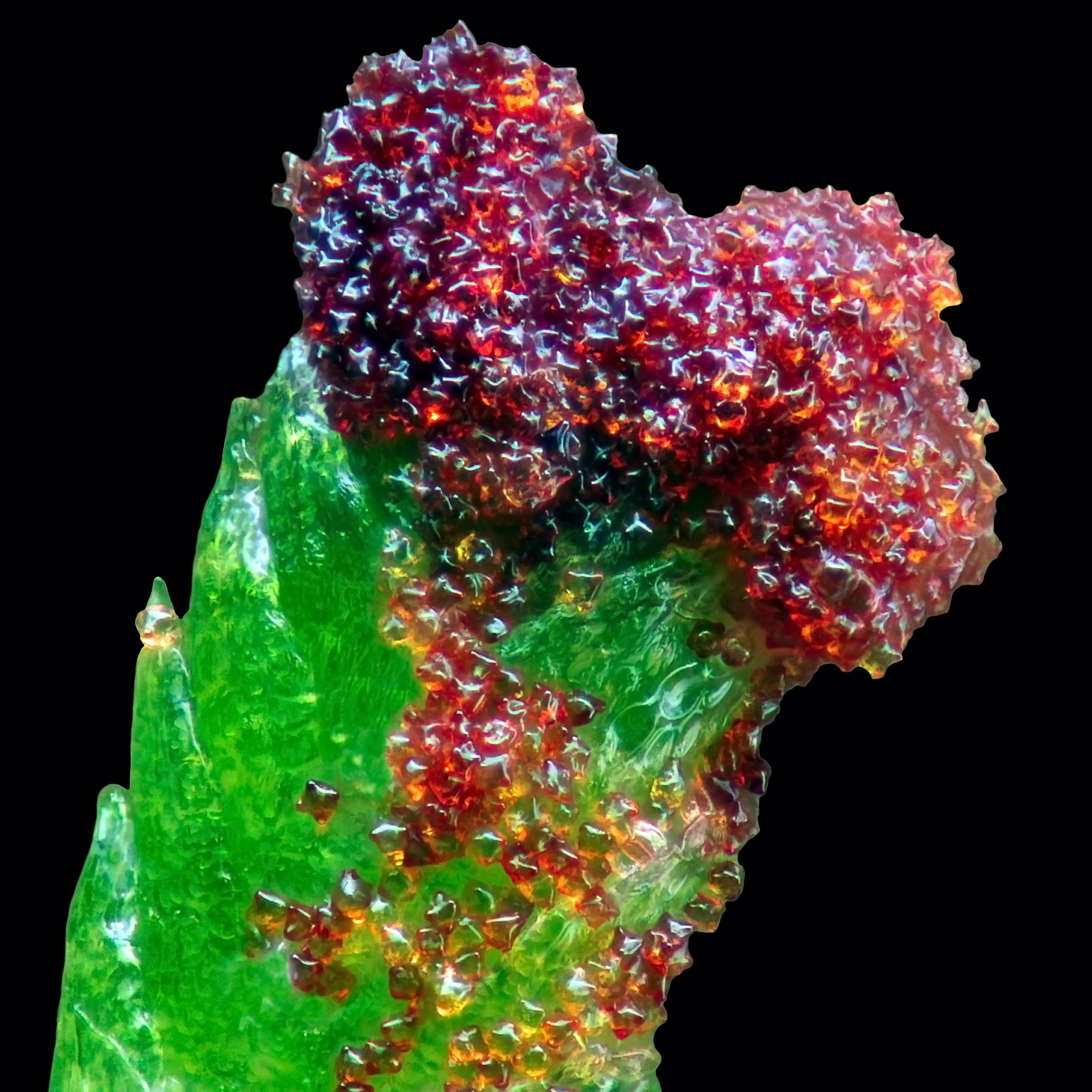

Scientific classification
- Kingdom: Plantae
- Division: Marchantiophyta
- Class: Jungermanniopsida
- Order: Lophoziales
- Family: Anastrophyllaceae
- Genus: Anastrophyllum
- Species: A. hellerianum

Binomial name
- Anastrophyllum hellerianum (Nees ex Lindenb.) R.M. Schust.

= Anastrophyllum hellerianum =

Species of liverwort

Anastrophyllum hellerianum is a species of liverwort belonging to the family Anastrophyllaceae.

Synonyms:

- Isopaches hellerianus (Nees ex Lindenb.) H. Buch
- Jungermannia helleriana Nees ex Lindenb.
- Sphenolobus hellerianus (Nees ex Lindenb.) Stephani
