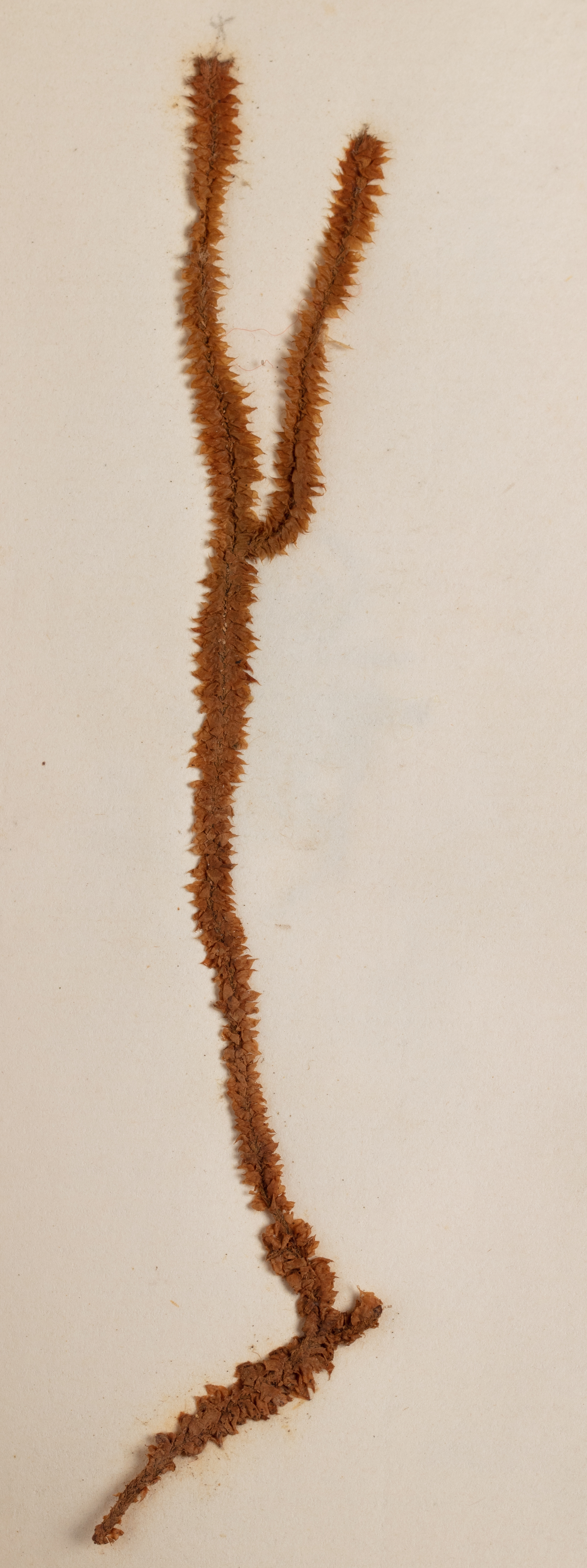
- Chandonanthus squarrosus

Scientific classification
- Kingdom: Plantae
- Division: Marchantiophyta
- Class: Jungermanniopsida
- Order: Lophoziales
- Family: Anastrophyllaceae
- Genus: Chandonanthus; Mitt.

= Chandonanthus =

Genus of liverworts

Chandonanthus is a genus of liverworts belonging to the family Anastrophyllaceae.

The genus is only found in North America, parts of Europe, Central Africa, parts of East Asia, and Australasia.

== Species ==
As accepted by the Global Biodiversity Information Facility (GBIF);

- Chandonanthus perloi Gola
- Chandonanthus pusillus Stephani
- Chandonanthus quadrifidus Stephani
- Chandonanthus squarrosus (Menzies) Mitt.
