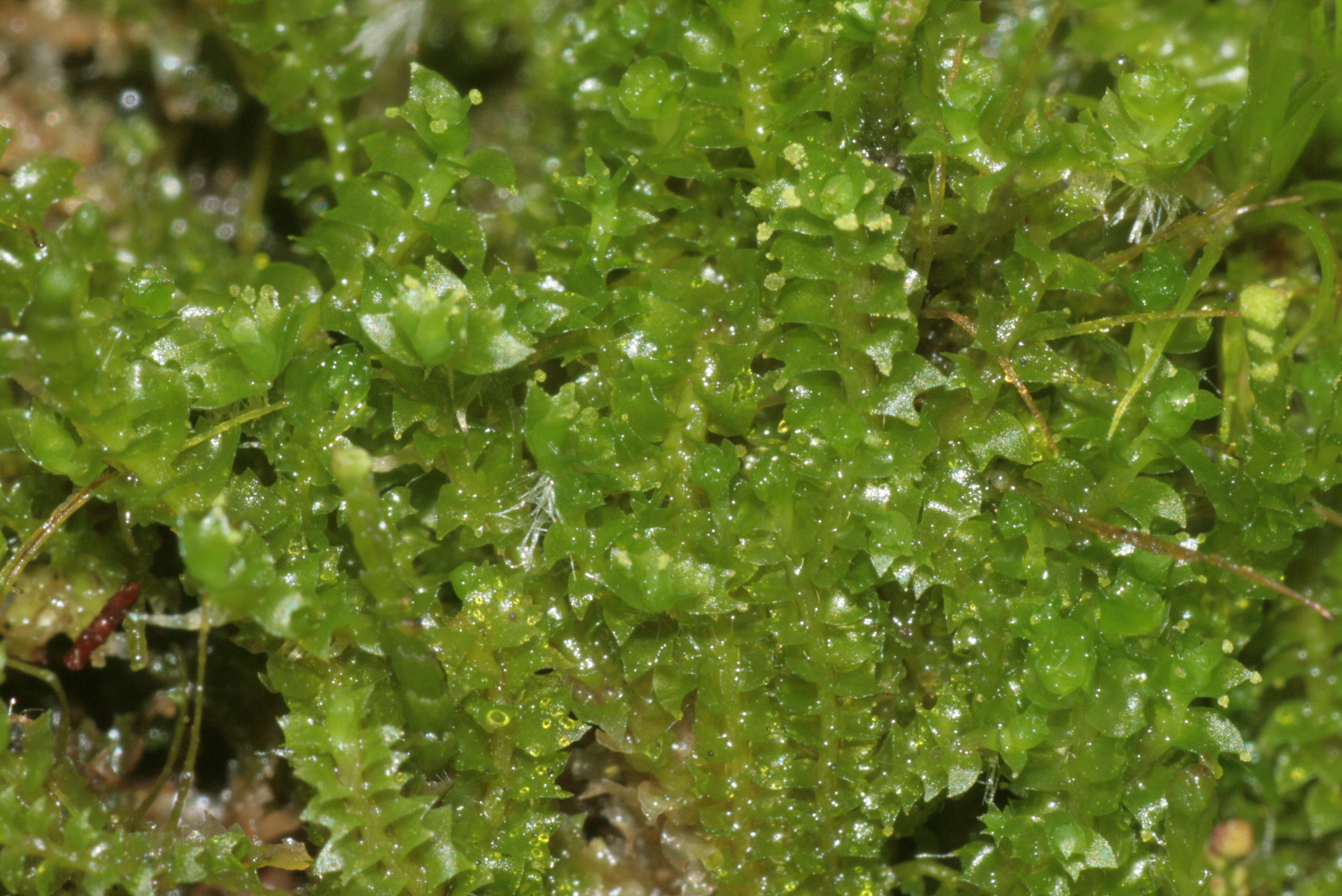

Scientific classification
- Kingdom: Plantae
- Division: Marchantiophyta
- Class: Jungermanniopsida
- Order: Lophoziales
- Family: Anastrophyllaceae
- Genus: Barbilophozia
- Species: B. attenuata

Binomial name
- Barbilophozia attenuata (Nees) Loeske

= Barbilophozia attenuata =

Species of liverwort

Barbilophozia attenuata is a species of liverwort belonging to the family Anastrophyllaceae.

It is native to Eurasia and Northern America.

== Ecology ==
Barbilophozia attenuata reproduces both sexually through spores and asexually via gemmae (specialised reproductive structures). The spores are small (10–14 micrometre (μm) in diameter) and verruculose, while the triangular gemmae are larger (19–22 by 22–32 μm) and one-to-two-celled. Studies have shown that the species shows different reproductive patterns depending on habitat conditions – plants growing along disturbed areas like ant trails tend to reproduce primarily through asexual gemmae, while those in other locations show higher rates of sexual reproduction through spore production. The larger gemmae provide more effective local establishment compared to spores, particularly in disturbed microsites, while the smaller spores enable longer-distance dispersal. Research using genetic markers has demonstrated that populations show significant spatial genetic structure at short distances (up to about 8 meters), with nearby plants being more closely related than would be expected by chance. This pattern suggests that local colonisation occurs primarily through asexual reproduction, while gene flow over longer distances is facilitated by spore dispersal.
