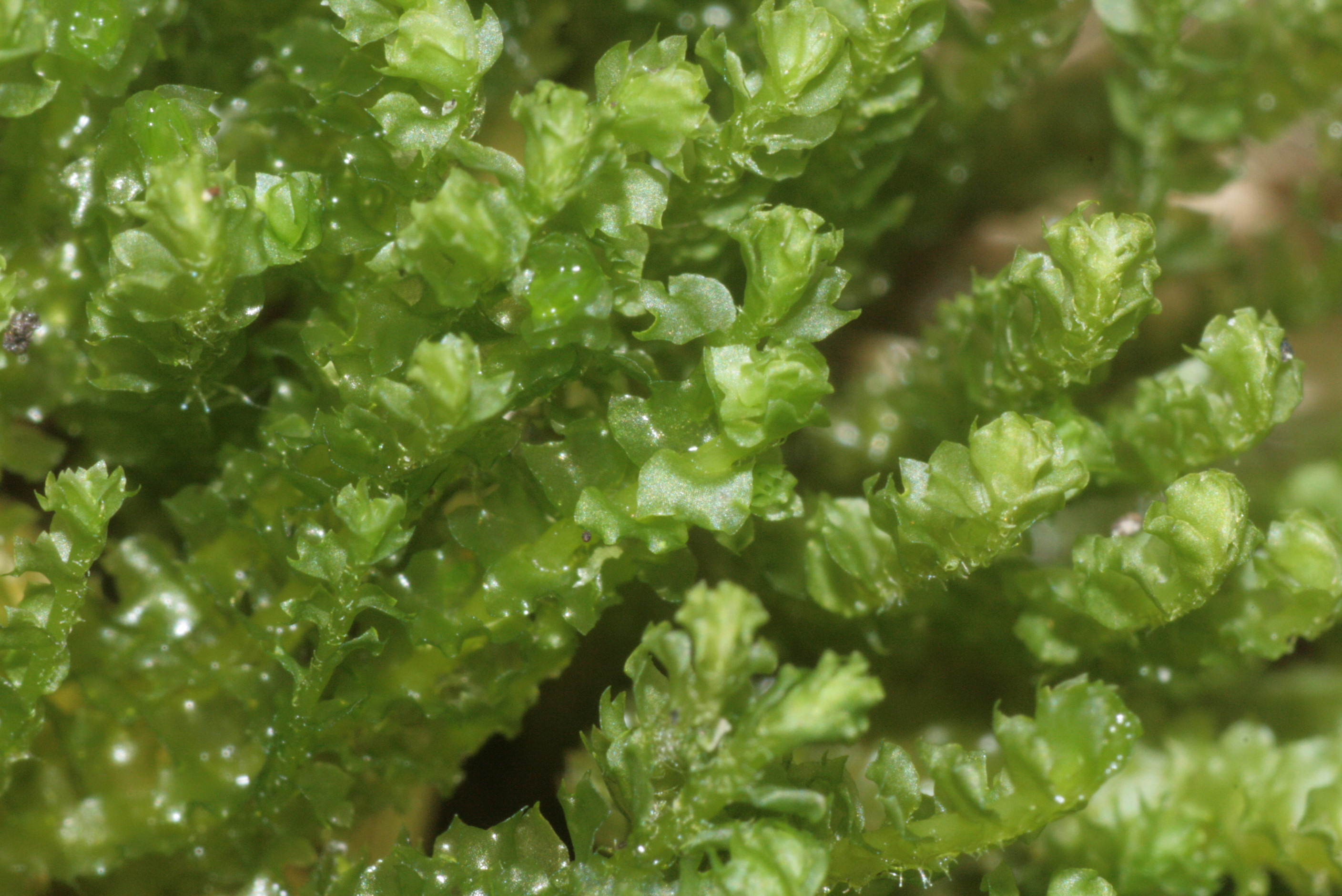
- Barbilophozia floerkei

Scientific classification
- Kingdom: Plantae
- Division: Marchantiophyta
- Class: Jungermanniopsida
- Order: Lophoziales
- Family: Anastrophyllaceae
- Genus: Barbilophozia; Loeske

= Barbilophozia =

Genus of liverworts

Barbilophozia is a liverwort genus in the family Anastrophyllaceae.

== Species ==
- Barbilophozia atlantica (Kaal.) K. Mull., the Atlantic barbilophozia
- Barbilophozia attenuata (Mart.) Loeske, the attenuate barbilophozia
- Barbilophozia barbata (Schmid. ex Schreb.) Loeske, the barbilophozia
- Barbilophozia binsteadii (Kaal.) Loeske, the Binstead's barbilophozia
- Barbilophozia cavifolia (Buch & S. Arnell) R. Stotl. & B. Stotl., the barbilophozia
- Barbilophozia floerkei (Web. & Mohr) Loeske, the Floerke's barbilophozia
- Barbilophozia gracilis K. Müll., the barbilophozia
- Barbilophozia hatcheri (Evans) Loeske, the Hatcher's barbilophozia
- Barbilophozia hyperborea (Schust.) R. Stotl. & B. Stotl., the barbilophozia
- Barbilophozia kunzeana (Hub.) Gams, the Kunze's barbilophozia
- Barbilophozia lycopodioides (Wallr.) Loeske, the barbilophozia
- Barbilophozia quadriloba (Lindb.) Loeske, the fourlobe barbilophozia
- Barbilophozia rubescens (Schust. & Damsholt) Kart. & Söder., the barbilophozia
