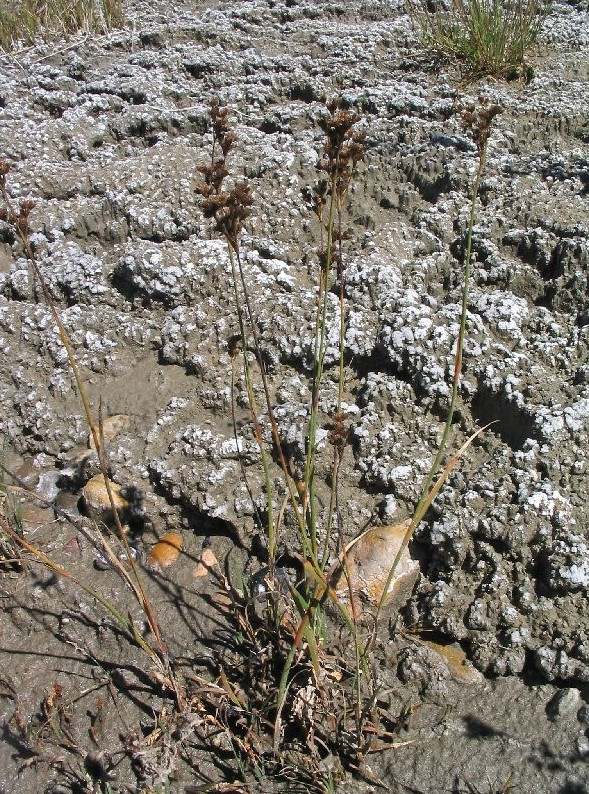

Scientific classification
- Kingdom: Plantae
- Clade: Tracheophytes
- Clade: Angiosperms
- Clade: Monocots
- Clade: Commelinids
- Order: Poales
- Family: Juncaceae
- Genus: Juncus
- Species: J. saximontanus

Binomial name
- Juncus saximontanus A.Nels.

= Juncus saximontanus =

Species of grass

Juncus saximontanus is a species of rush known by the common name Rocky Mountain rush. It is native to much of western North America from Alaska to central Mexico, where it grows in wet habitat, often in mountainous areas, such as bogs and moist meadows.

This is a rhizomatous perennial herb producing a clump of stems up to about 60 centimeters tall. The inflorescence is made up of several oval or spherical heads containing up to 25 flowers each. The flower has narrow, pointed brown segments not more than about 3 millimeters long. This rush is sometimes treated as a variety of Juncus ensifolius.
