= Hattoria =

Conservation status
- Vulnerable (IUCN 2.3)

Scientific classification
- Kingdom: Plantae
- Division: Marchantiophyta
- Class: Jungermanniopsida
- Order: Lophoziales
- Family: Anastrophyllaceae
- Genus: Hattoria; R.M.Schust.
- Species: H. yakushimensis

Binomial name
- Hattoria yakushimensis (Horik.) R.M.Schust.

Synonyms
- Anastrophyllum yakushimense Horik.

Genus of liverworts

Hattoria yakushimensis is the only species of liverwort in the genus Hattoria, in the family Anastrophyllaceae. It is endemic to Japan. Its natural habitat is temperate forests. It is threatened by habitat loss.

The genus name Hattoria is in honour of Sinsuke (Sinske, Shinsuke) Hattori (1915-1992), who was a Japanese botanist (Bryology) and Professor of Botany at the University of Tokyo.
