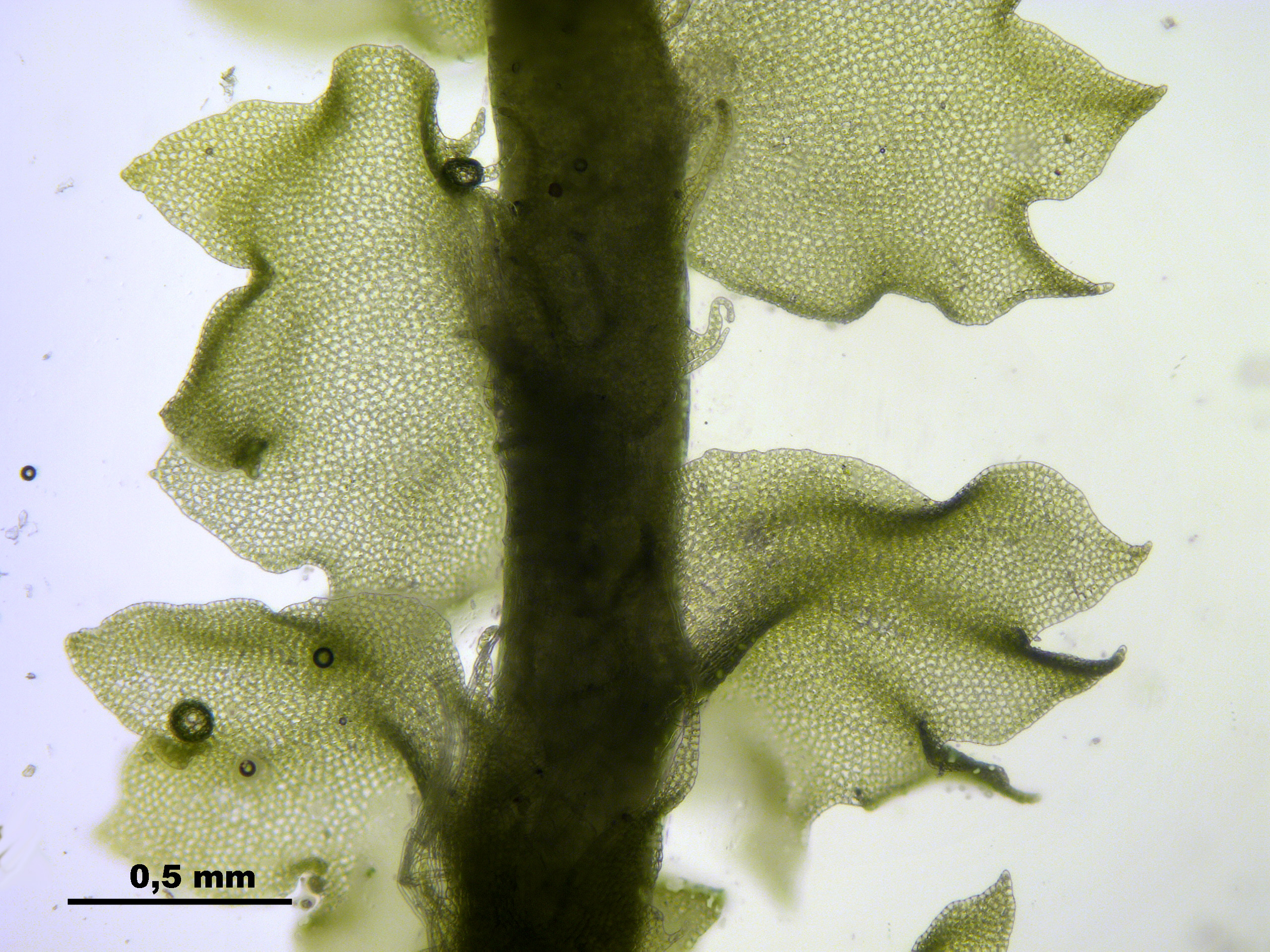
- Neoorthocaulis floerkei

Scientific classification
- Kingdom: Plantae
- Division: Marchantiophyta
- Class: Jungermanniopsida
- Order: Lophoziales
- Family: Anastrophyllaceae
- Genus: Neoorthocaulis; L.Söderstr.

Type species
- Neoorthocaulis attenuatus (Mart.) L.Söderstr., De Roo & Hedd.

= Neoorthocaulis =

Genus of liverworts

Neoorthocaulis is a genus of liverworts belonging to the family Anastrophyllaceae.

The species of this genus are mainly found in Northern Hemisphere.

== Species ==
As accepted by GBIF;

- Neoorthocaulis attenuatus (Mart.) L.Söderstr., De Roo & Hedd.
- Neoorthocaulis binsteadii (Kaal.) L.Söderstr., De Roo & Hedd.
- Neoorthocaulis floerkei (F.Weber & D.Mohr) L.Söderstr., De Roo & Hedd.
- Neoorthocaulis hyperboreus (R.M.Schust.) L.Söderstr., De Roo & Hedd.
