= Isopaches =

Scientific classification
- Kingdom: Plantae
- Division: Marchantiophyta
- Class: Jungermanniopsida
- Order: Lophoziales
- Family: Anastrophyllaceae
- Genus: Isopaches; H.Buch

Genus of liverworts

Isopaches is a genus of liverworts belonging to the family Anastrophyllaceae.

The genus has almost cosmopolitan distribution.

== Species ==
As accepted by GBIF;

- Isopaches alboviridis (R.M.Schust.) Schljakov
- Isopaches bicrenatus (Schmidel ex Hoffm.) H.Buch
- Isopaches decolorans (Limpr.) H.Buch
- Isopaches pumicicola (Berggr.) Bakalin
