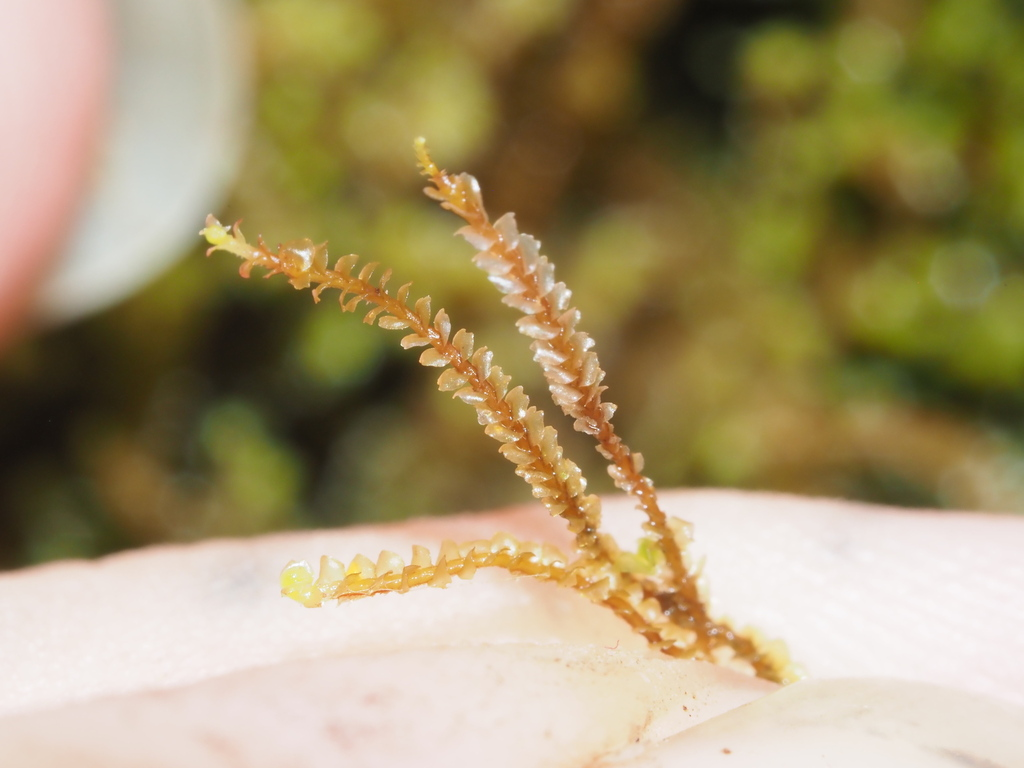

Scientific classification
- Kingdom: Plantae
- Division: Marchantiophyta
- Class: Jungermanniopsida
- Order: Lophoziales
- Family: Anastrophyllaceae
- Genus: Anastrepta (Lindb.) Schiffn.

= Anastrepta =

Genus of liverworts

Anastrepta is a genus of liverworts belonging to the family Anastrophyllaceae. This taxon was first described in 1889 as Jungermannia sect. Anastrepta by Sextus Otto Lindberg, and was first described as a genus by Victor Félix Schiffner in 1893.

The species of this genus are found in Eurasia and Northern America.

== Species ==
- Anastrepta bifida (Stephani) Stephani
- Anastrepta longissima (Stephani) Stephani
- Anastrepta orcadensis (Hook.) Schiffner
