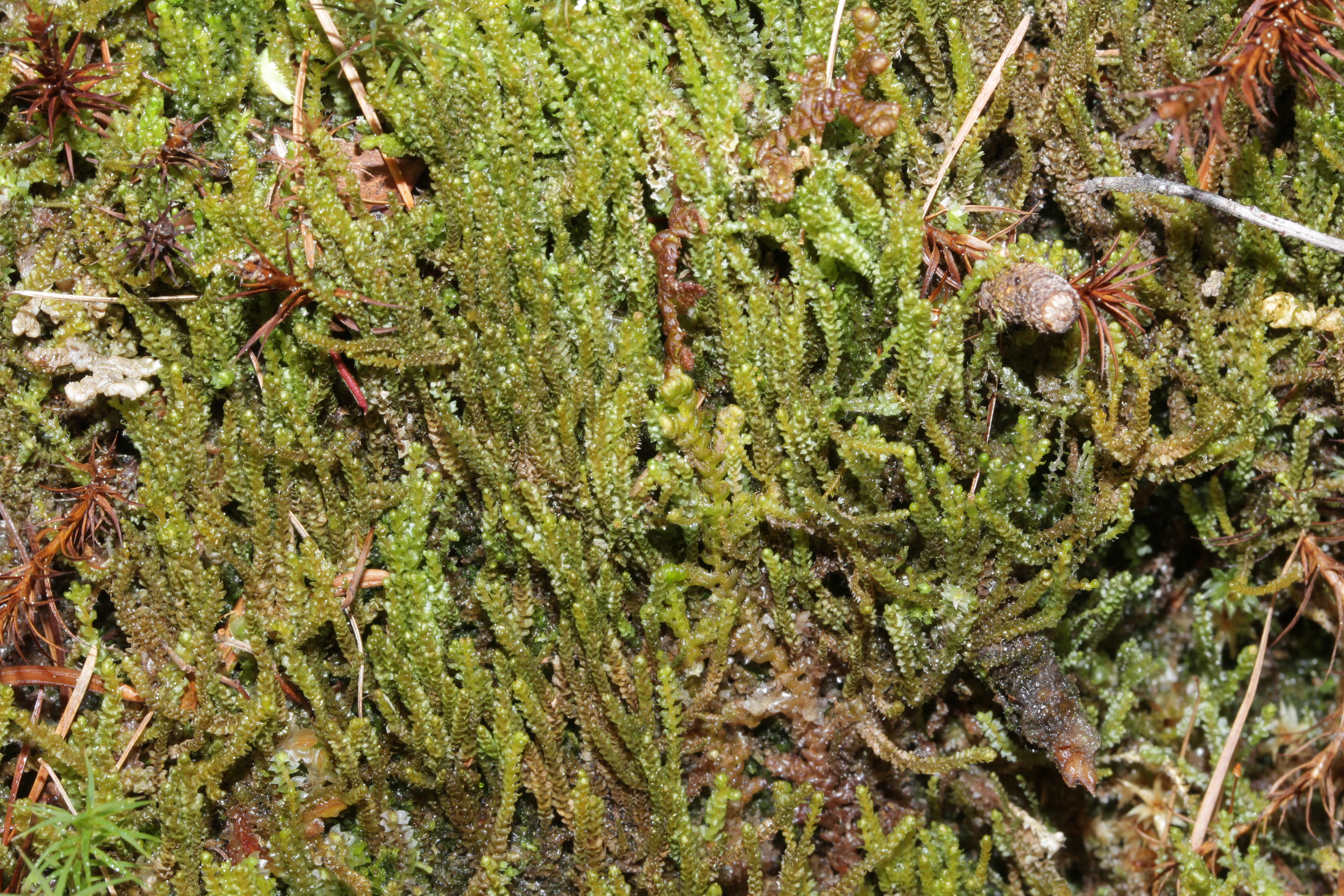
- Schljakovia kunzeana

Scientific classification
- Kingdom: Plantae
- Division: Marchantiophyta
- Class: Jungermanniopsida
- Order: Lophoziales
- Family: Anastrophyllaceae
- Genus: Schljakovia; Konstant. & Vilnet
- Species: S. kunzeana

Binomial name
- Schljakovia kunzeana (Huebener) Konstant. & Vilnet

Synonyms
- Lophozia kunzeana (Huebener) A.Evans

= Schljakovia =

Genus of liverworts

Schljakovia is a monotypic genus of liverworts belonging to the family Anastrophyllaceae. The only known species is Schljakovia kunzeana.

The genus was described by Nadezhda Konstantinova and Anna Alexandrovna Vilnet in Arctoa vol.18 on page 66 in 2009.

It is native to Eurasia and Northern America.

The genus name of Schljakovia is in honour of Roman Nicolaevich Schljakov (1912–1999), who was a Russian naturalist and botanist (Bryology and Lichenology) and Geobotanist. He worked at Komarov Botanical Institute.
