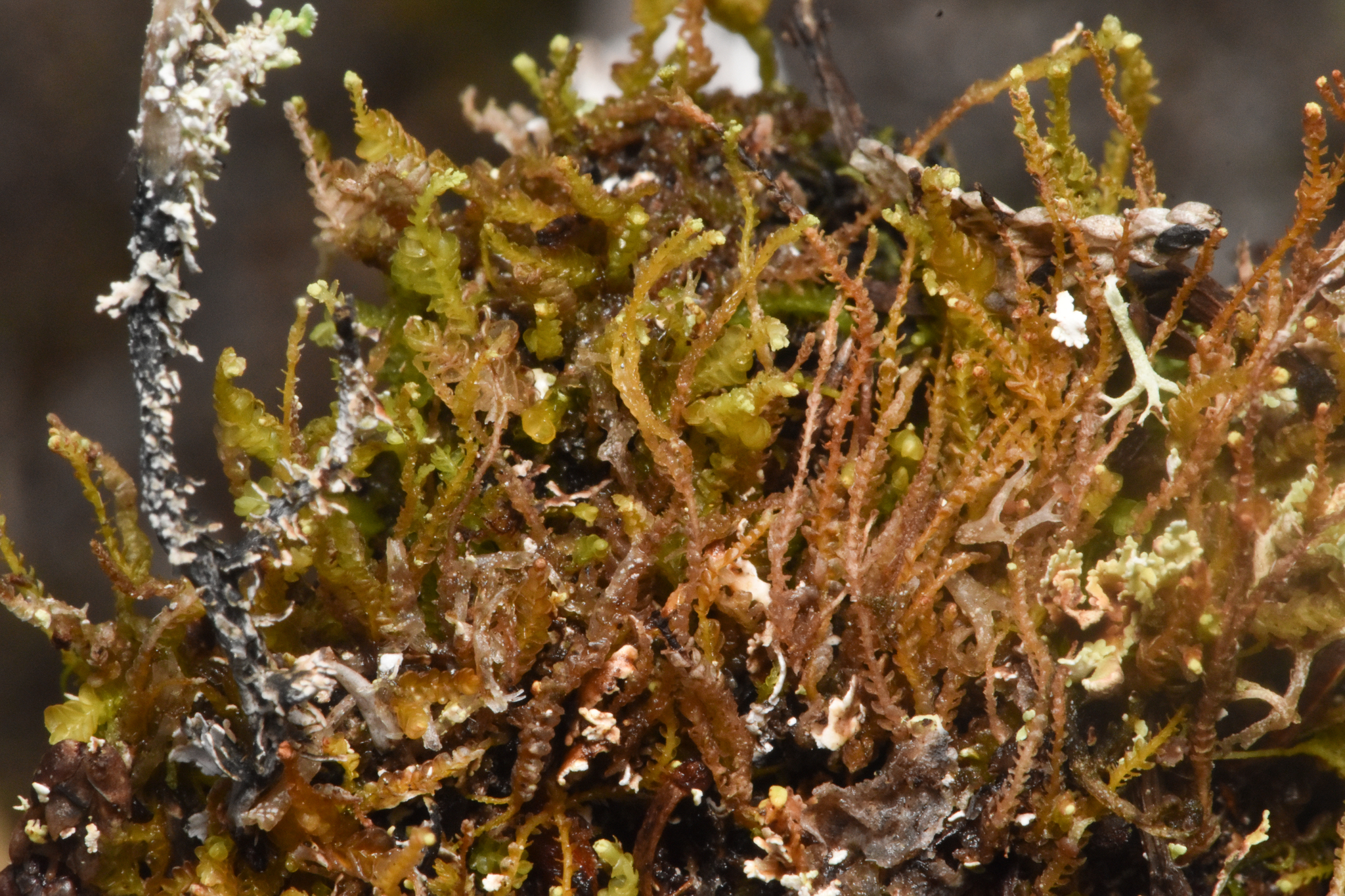
- Sphenolobus minutus

Scientific classification
- Kingdom: Plantae
- Division: Marchantiophyta
- Class: Jungermanniopsida
- Order: Lophoziales
- Family: Anastrophyllaceae
- Genus: Sphenolobus (Lindb.) Berggr.

Type species
- Anastrophyllum donnianum (formerly Jungermannia donniana) (W. J. Hooker) Stephani

Synonyms
- Eremonotus Lindb. & Kaal. ex Pearson; Jungermannia subg. Anastrophyllum Spruce; Schizophyllopsis Váňa & L. Söderstr.; Sphenolobus (Lindb.) Berggr.

= Sphenolobus =

Genus of liverworts

Sphenolobus is a genus of liverworts belonging to the family Anastrophyllaceae.

The genus has a cosmopolitan distribution, but mainly in the Northern Hemisphere.

== Species ==
As accepted by GBIF;

- Sphenolobus achrous Spruce
- Sphenolobus acuminatus Horik.
- Sphenolobus austroamericanus (Váa) Váa
- Sphenolobus austroamericanus (Váňa) Váňa
- Sphenolobus flagellaris (S.Hatt.) Grolle
- Sphenolobus minutus (Schreb.) Berggr.
- Sphenolobus pearcei Stephani
- Sphenolobus rigidus (Lindb.) Müll.Frib.
- Sphenolobus saccatula (Lindb.) Müll.Frib.
- Sphenolobus saxicola (Schrad.) Steph.
- Sphenolobus striolatus Horik.
