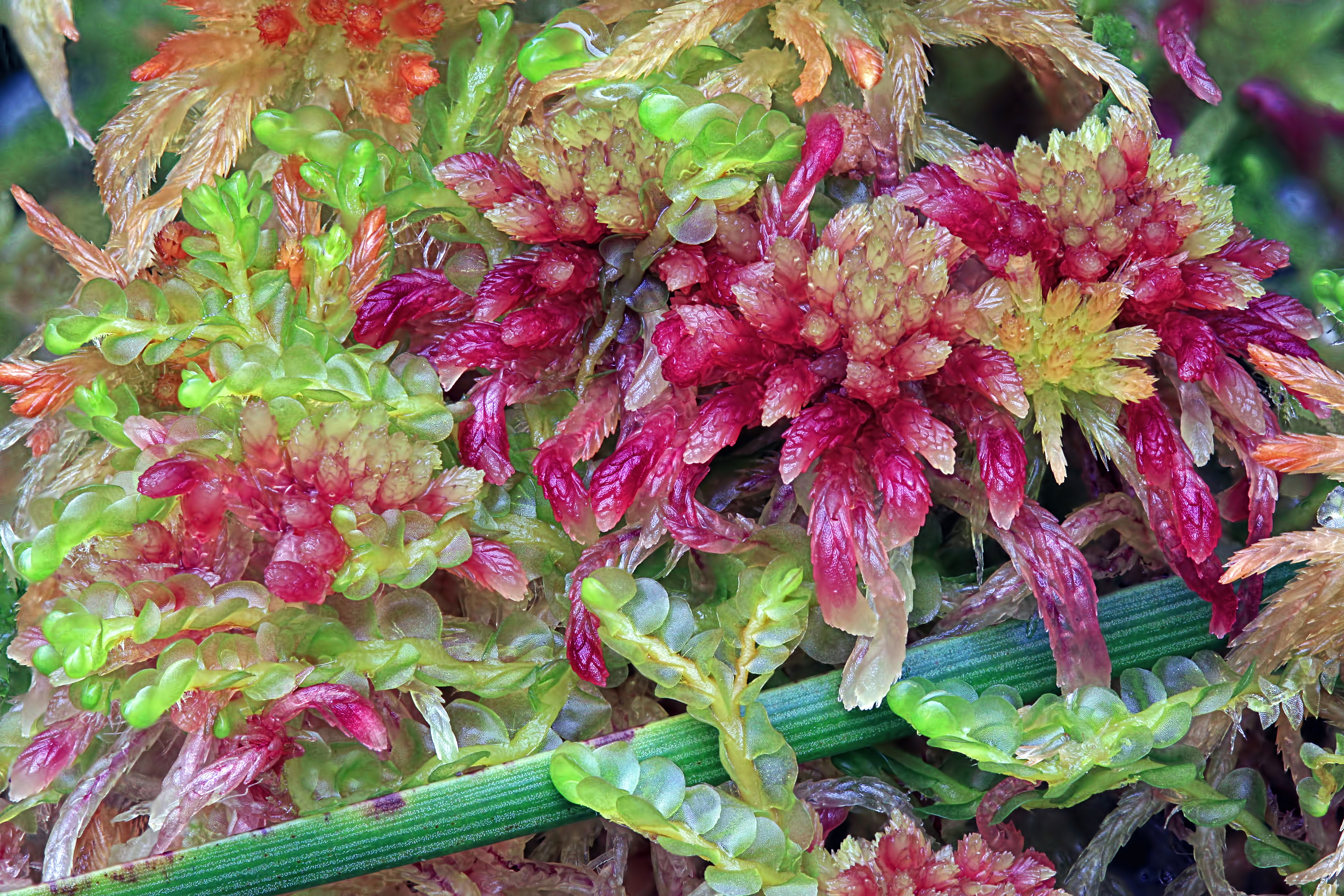

Conservation status
- Vulnerable (IUCN 2.3)

Scientific classification
- Kingdom: Plantae
- Division: Marchantiophyta
- Class: Jungermanniopsida
- Order: Lophoziales
- Family: Anastrophyllaceae
- Genus: Biantheridion
- Species: B. undulifolium

Binomial name
- Biantheridion undulifolium (Nees) Konstant. & Vilnet

Synonyms
- Aplozia autumnalis var. undulifolia (Nees) Boulay; Crossogyna undulifolia (Nees) Schljakov; Jamesoniella autumnalis var. undulifolia (Nees) Meyl.; Jamesoniella schraderi var. undulifolia (Nees) C.E.O.Jensen; Jamesoniella undulifolia (Nees) Müll.Frib.; Jungermannia schraderi f. undulifolia Nees; Jungermannia schraderi var. undulifolia (Nees) Gottsche, Lindenb. & Nees

= Biantheridion =

Species of liverwort

Biantheridion is a genus of liverwort in the family Anastrophyllaceae. Its only accepted species is Biantheridion undulifolium (synonyms including Jamesoniella undulifolia) the marsh flapwort, or marsh earwort. It is found in Austria, China, the Czech Republic, Denmark, Finland, France, Germany, Greenland, North Korea, Norway, Poland, Russia, Sweden, Switzerland, and the United Kingdom. Its natural habitat is swamps. It is threatened by habitat loss.
