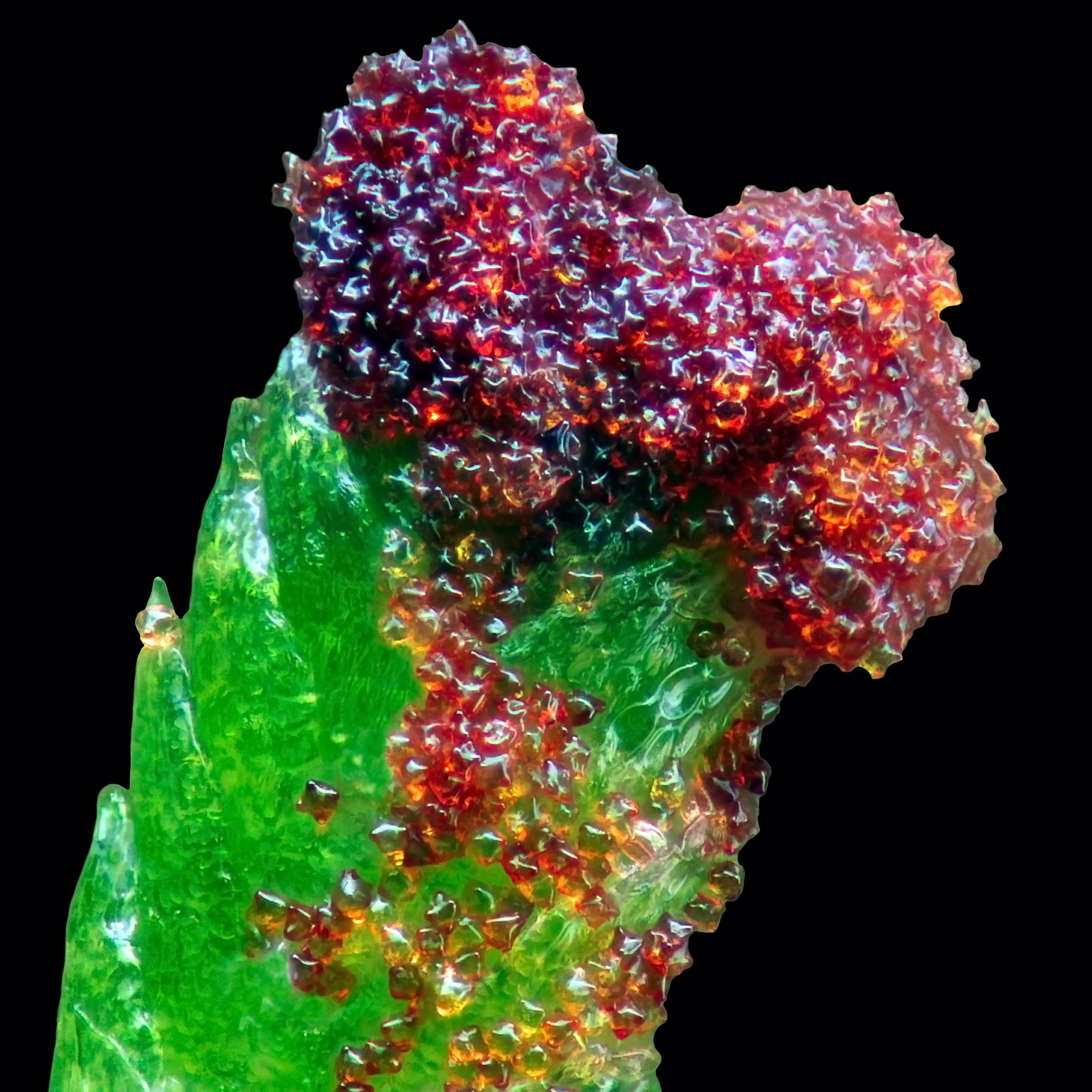
- Gemmiferous shoot tip of Crossocalyx hellerianus (synonym Anastrophyllum hellerianum)

Scientific classification
- Kingdom: Plantae
- Division: Marchantiophyta
- Class: Jungermanniopsida
- Order: Lophoziales
- Family: Anastrophyllaceae; L.Söderstr., De Roo et Hedd, 2010
- Genus: Crossocalyx; Meyl., 1939

Type species
- Crossocalyx hellerianus (Nees ex Lindenb.) Meyl.

= Crossocalyx =

Genus of liverworts

Crossocalyx is a genus of leafy liverworts belonging in the family Anastrophyllaceae. The genus includes two species globally (C. hellerianus and C. tenuis) and is distributed across the Northern hemisphere in Europe, Asia and Central and North America.

== Description ==
The genus Crossocalyx is characterised by the minute (usually up to 0.8 cm long) and distally erect, filiform shoots with uniformely bilobed leaves and abundant red to purple gemmae. The two species in the genus are both dioicous. They are distinguished from one another by their ecology, size (C. hellerianus often being double the size of C. tenuis), gemmae (1-celled or rarely 2-celled and in reflected light bright red to vinaceous or purple in C. hellerianus, whereas 2-celled and dark purple in C. tenuis), leaf cells (weakly to strongly thickened cell walls in C. hellerianus but thin cell walls in C. tenuis), and leaf shape. The Crossocalyx species are distinguished from similar species of other genera by the gemmae form and colour, stem anatomy, the uniformely bilobed leaves, the thickness of cell walls, the width of the shoots, the number of cells in the gemmae, the number of oil bodies per leaf cell, the lack of stolons (creeping stems lacking or having minute leaves), and ecology.

== Ecology ==
C. hellerianus grows in shaded sites on decaying pine logs, sometimes on the logs of other trees, or rarely on bark or on a thin layer of algae and lichens in rock crevices.

C. tenuis is a calciphyte, occurring as an early pioneer on newly exposed rock in cool, sheltered and not too dry locations.

== Distribution ==
The distribution of C. hellerianus approximately coincides with the coniferous forest zone, with some occurrences in the deciduous forest zone. It is reported from the Northern hemisphere in Europe, Asia and Central and North America.

C. tenuis is endemic to Ontario, Canada.

== Classification ==
Crossocalyx belongs in the family Anastrophyllaceae, in the order Lophoziales. The genus comprises two species: C. hellerianus and C. tenuis.

=== Historical treatment ===
In addition to C. hellerianus and C. tenuis, a third species "C. koriakensis" was described from Russia by Schljakov in 1978, suppusedly close to C. tenuis but differing by leaf cell and gammae attributes. Andrejeva et al. (2009) argue that the type of "C. koriakensis" belongs to C. hellerianus and that the seeming lack of gemmiferous, attentuate braches in this specimen is not enough to uphold the species status of "C. koriakensis", since specimens belonging to C. hellerianus often share this attribute in north-east Asia. Only C. hellerianus and C. tenuis are recognised as species in the most recent global checklist of liverworts.

The genus Crossocalyx was first described by Charles Meylan in 1939, then including C. hellerianus only, based on the view that this species did not have a sufficiently similar morphology to any other genus. The species of this genus have also been included in Anastrophyllum, Sphenolobus, Lophozia, Prionolobus, Jungermannia, Cephalozia, Diplophyllum, Diplophylleia, or Isopaches. The renewed recognition of the genus Crossocalyx in the 21st centrury is supported by molecular data.

The species in Crossocalyx were previously placed in the family Jungermanniaceae or in Lophoziaceae, but molecular data supports the recognition of Anastrophyllaceae as a distinct family within the Lophoziaceae/Scapaniaceae/Cephaloziellaceae clade, and this is where Crossocalyx is now situated. The exact phylogenetic relationship between Crossocalyx and other genera of Anastrophyllaceae differs betweens authors.

In the most recent global checklist of liverworts from 2016, Crossocalyx is placed in the suborder Cephaloziineae, in the order Jungermanniales, but more recent molecular data provides evidence that the families previously included in Cephaloziineae are part of the order Lophoziales.
