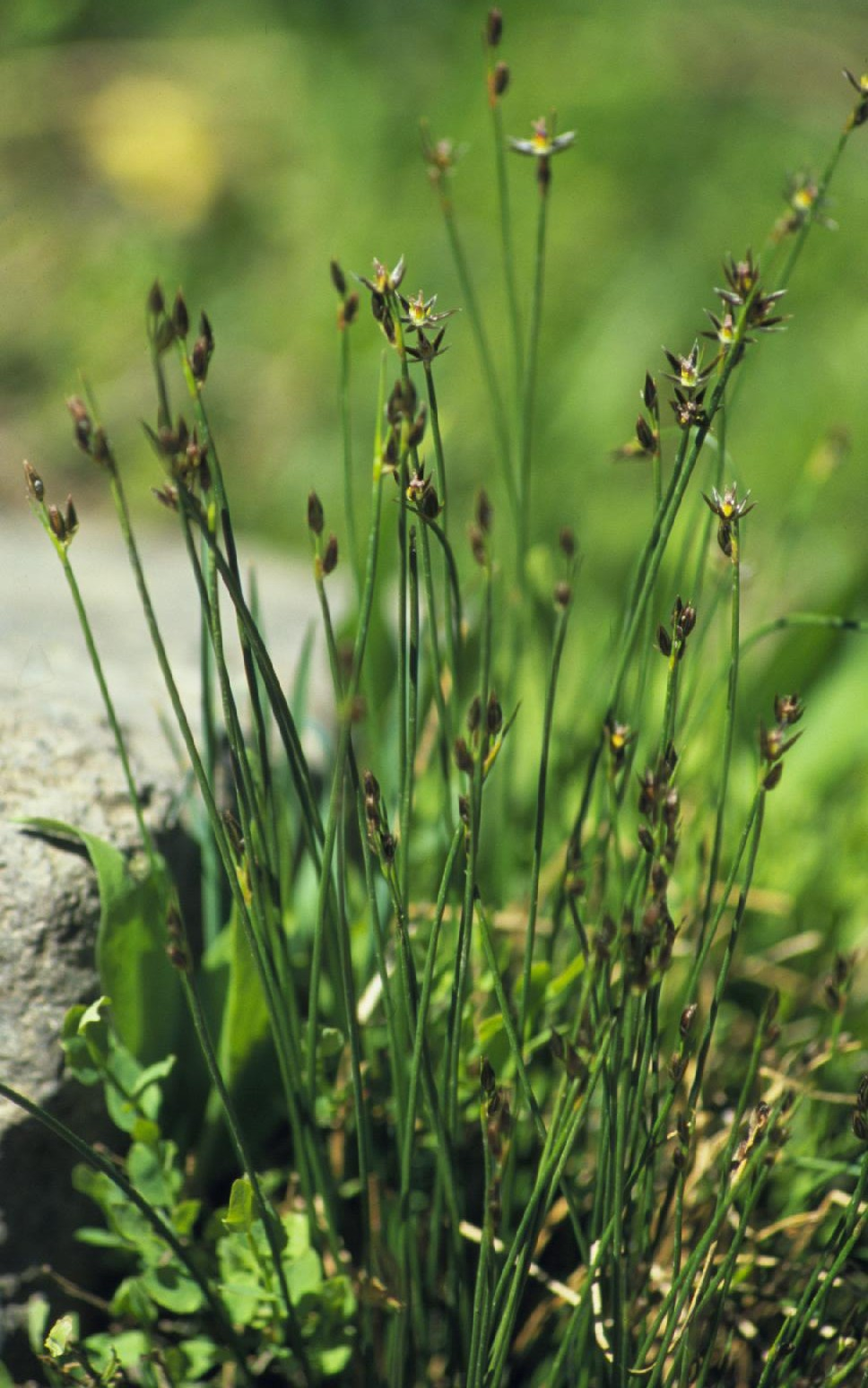

Scientific classification
- Kingdom: Plantae
- Clade: Embryophytes
- Clade: Tracheophytes
- Clade: Angiosperms
- Clade: Monocots
- Clade: Commelinids
- Order: Poales
- Family: Juncaceae
- Genus: Juncus
- Species: J. drummondii

Binomial name
- Juncus drummondii E.Mey.

Synonyms
- Homotypic Synonyms: Agathryon drummondii (E.Mey.) Záv.Drábk. & Proćków; Juncus arcticus var. gracilis Hook.; Heterotypic Synonyms: Juncus compressus var. subtriflorus E.Mey.; Juncus drummondii f. davisonii H.St.John; Juncus drummondii var. humilis Engelm.; Juncus drummondii var. longifructus H.St.John; Juncus drummondii var. subtriflorus (E.Mey.) C.L.Hitchc.; Juncus pauperculus O.Schwarz; Juncus subtriflorus (E.Mey.) Coville

= Juncus drummondii =

Species of grass

Juncus drummondii is a species of rush in the family Juncaceae. It is sometimes referred to by the common name Drummond's rush. It is native to western North America from northern Canada and Alaska to New Mexico, where it grows in wet coniferous forest and alpine meadows and slopes. It is a perennial herb forming narrow, erect tufts to about 40 centimeters in maximum height. The leaves are basal and most have no real blades; instead they form a sheath around the stem a few centimeters long. The inflorescence is borne on the side of the stem toward the top. There is a long, cylindrical bract at the base which extends out past the flowers. Each flower is on a thin pedicel. The thick tepals are dark brown, sometimes with green striping and thin, transparent edges. There are six stamens with yellowish anthers, and red stigmas. The fruit is a capsule.
