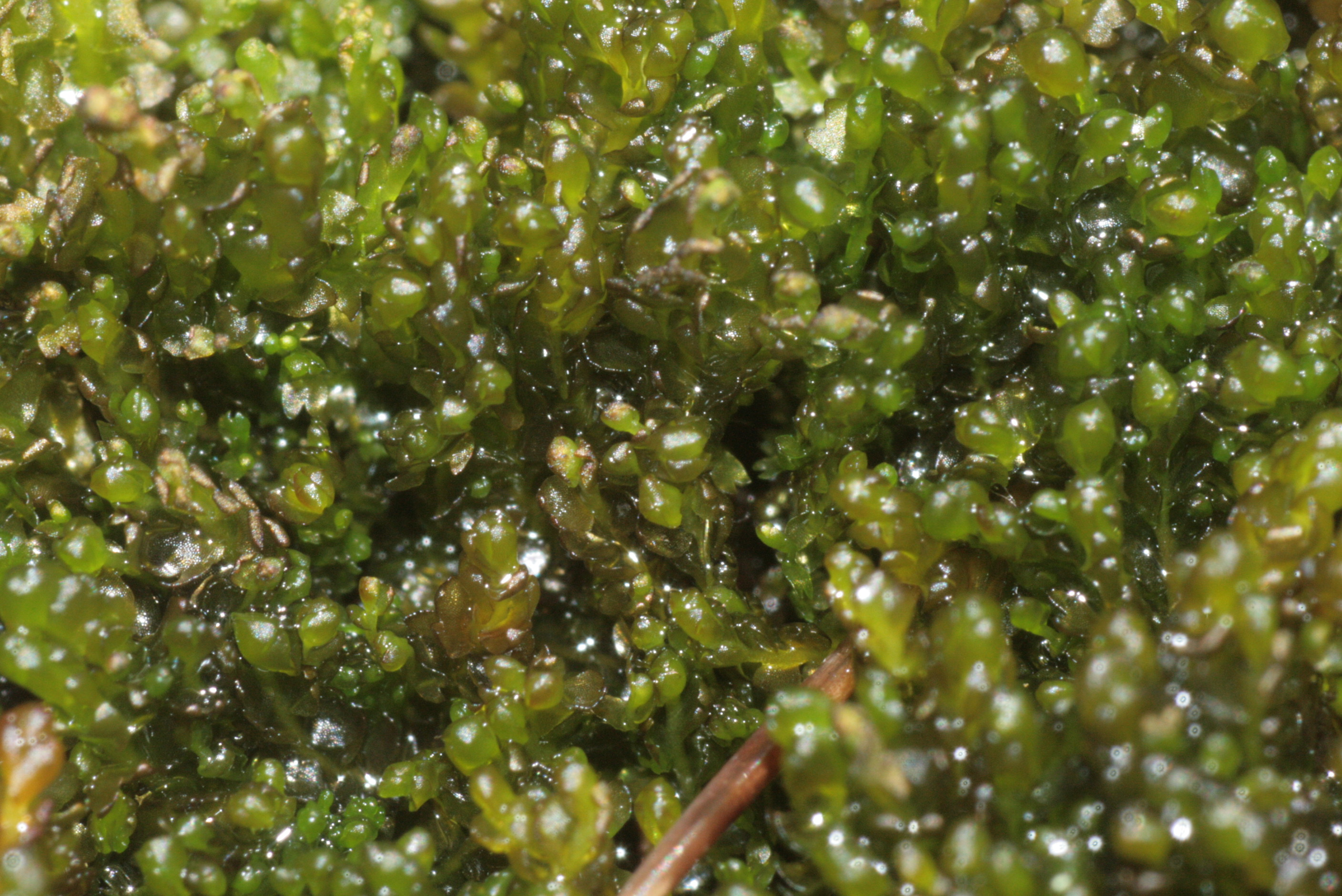

Scientific classification
- Kingdom: Plantae
- Division: Marchantiophyta
- Class: Jungermanniopsida
- Order: Lophoziales
- Family: Anastrophyllaceae
- Genus: Gymnocolea (Dumort.) Dumort.
- Species: G. inflata

Binomial name
- Gymnocolea inflata (Huds.) Dumort.

Synonyms
- Jungermannia sect. Gymnocolea Dumort.

= Gymnocolea =

Genus of liverworts

Gymnocolea is a genus of liverworts in the family Anastrophyllaceae.

The genus has cosmopolitan distribution in the Northern Hemisphere.

== Species ==
The genus is made up of a single species, Gymnocolea inflata, which has two subspecies: Gymnocolea inflata subsp. acutiloba and Gymnocolea inflata subsp. inflata.
