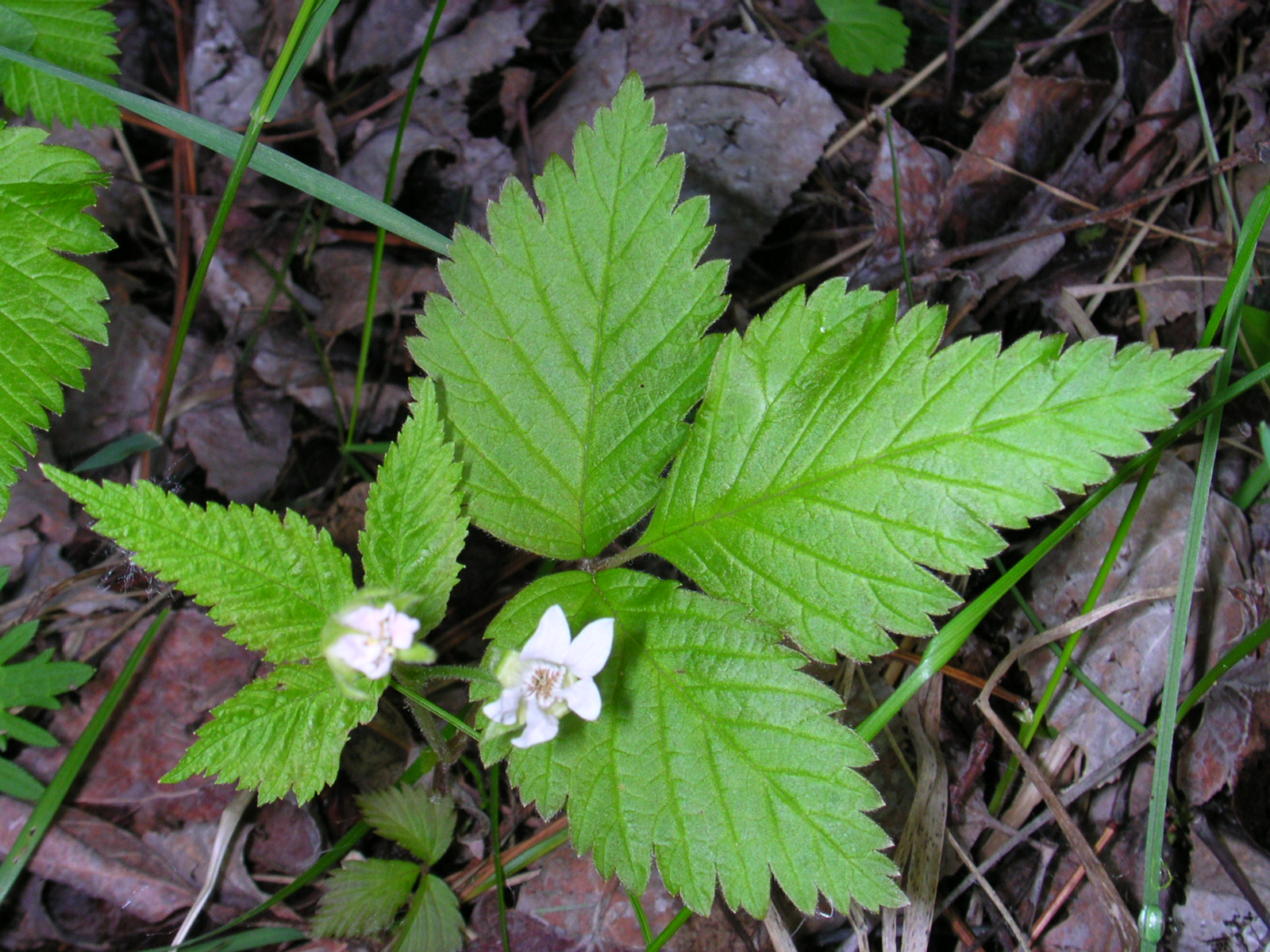

Scientific classification
- Kingdom: Plantae
- Clade: Tracheophytes
- Clade: Angiosperms
- Clade: Eudicots
- Clade: Rosids
- Order: Rosales
- Family: Rosaceae
- Genus: Rubus
- Species: R. pubescens

Binomial name
- Rubus pubescens Raf. 1811 not Vest ex Tratt. 1823 nor Weihe 1824 (syn of R. chloocladus) nor Bayer 1859 nor Kuntze 1891 nor Hayek 1901 nor Genev. 1880

Synonyms
- Rubus saxatilis var. canadensis Michx. 1803; Cylactis montana Raf.; Cylactis pubescens (Raf.) W.A.Weber; Cylastis montanus (Raf.) Raf.; Rubus canadensis Torr. 1824 not L. 1753; Rubus triflorus Richardson

= Rubus pubescens =

Berry and plant

Rubus pubescens (dwarf red blackberry, dwarf red raspberry, dewberry) is a herbaceous perennial plant widespread across much of Canada and the northern United States.

== Description ==
Dewberry is known as a subshrub or herbaceous perennial. The trailing stems (stolons) are 10 to 30 cm (4 to 12 in) in length, and the upright petioles are usually less than 20 cm (8 in) tall. They differ from larger shrubby species in the genus in that the only upright part is herbaceous and only lightly speckled with fine hairs (hence the specific epithet pubescens), as opposed to the woody stems and larger prickles that cover many other Rubus species.

The leaves are compound with three more or less sessile (stalk-less), diamond-shaped leaflets. The middle leaflet is the largest, and most symmetrical, while the two side leaflets are wider below the midrib; all leaflets have toothed margins. With the exception of the trailing stems, all parts of the plant are shed in the fall.

The flowers have five white petals, often curled backwards, and the yellowish anthers give the center an appearance of yellow and black speckles. Flowering typically occurs between late May and late June, depending on the locality, but occasional flowers can be seen from early May through August. Flowers usually produce a single shiny red fruit, in the form of a cluster of drupelets (several tiny berries attached to a central receptacle), in early July. Like a blackberry, the fruit does not easily separate from its receptacle.

== Distribution and habitat ==
The species is widespread across much of Canada and the northern United States, from Alaska to Newfoundland, and as far south as Oregon, Colorado, and West Virginia. It is most common in boreal and temperate forested areas of Canada and the United States, but ranges from montane to coastal elevations and from the arctic to the great plains, giving it a wide distribution in both north-south and east-west directions.

Dewberry is found in moist conifer or mixed-wood forests, with canopies dominated by spruce and fir with lesser components of aspen, maple, birch, or pine. It roots primarily in the organic layers of the soil. It is often found growing with bunchberry (Cornus canadensis), wild lily of the valley (Maianthemum canadense), and goldthread (Coptis trifolia).

== Ecology ==
Dewberry is eaten by a variety of mammals and birds, including black and grizzly bears, many small rodents, and game birds such as grouse.

Although the shallow-rooting tendency of dewberry makes it susceptible to damage by fire, it spreads quickly over a site by rhizomes, and can become an important component of ground cover after low and moderate-intensity disturbance, thereby reducing soil water loss from evaporation.

Like other members of the genus, dewberry is an insect-pollinated plant. Without insect pollination, the number of fruits produced and the number of drupelets per fruit can decrease by 85–95%. Because of its early flowering time, dewberry may be an important food source for insect pollinators in late spring, before the more nutritious and abundant flowering plants (e.g., red raspberry or blueberry crops) become available.

== Conservation ==
Dewberry is listed as threatened in the state of Illinois, where it is more commonly known as dwarf raspberry. This status is probably due to a combination of human habitat destruction and a natural rarity at the southern limit of this species' range.

== Uses ==
The fruits are sweet and juicy right off the plant, but can also be used in jams, jellies, and most recipes involving red raspberries. The receptacle can be eaten along with the berry.

Although dewberries are often too scattered and small to be an important traditional food for aboriginal groups in North America, those groups living in southern and eastern parts of the continent used the roots medicinally, to relieve various stomach ailments or to treat women with pregnancy or menstruation-related problems.
