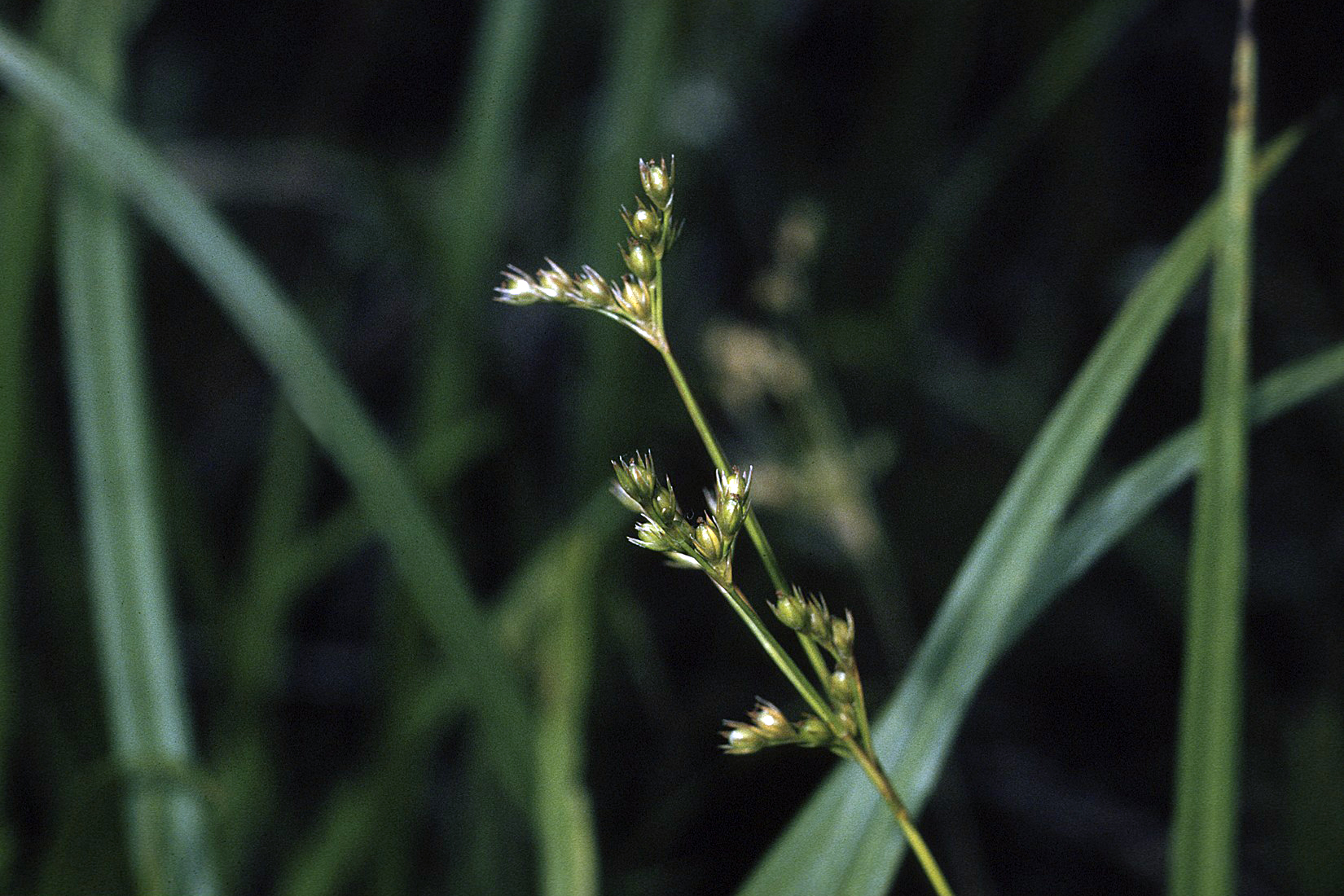
- Inflorescence

Scientific classification
- Kingdom: Plantae
- Clade: Tracheophytes
- Clade: Angiosperms
- Clade: Monocots
- Clade: Commelinids
- Order: Poales
- Family: Juncaceae
- Genus: Juncus
- Species: J. secundus

Binomial name
- Juncus secundus P.Beauv. ex Poir.

Synonyms
- Juncus tenuis var. secundus (P.Beauv. ex Poir.) Engelm.

= Juncus secundus =

Species of plant

Juncus secundus, the lopsided rush, one-sided rush, or second rush, is a species of flowering plants in the family Juncaceae. It is native to eastern North America and has been introduced to Primorsky Krai in Russia. It is typically found in serpentine, granite, and other barrens.
