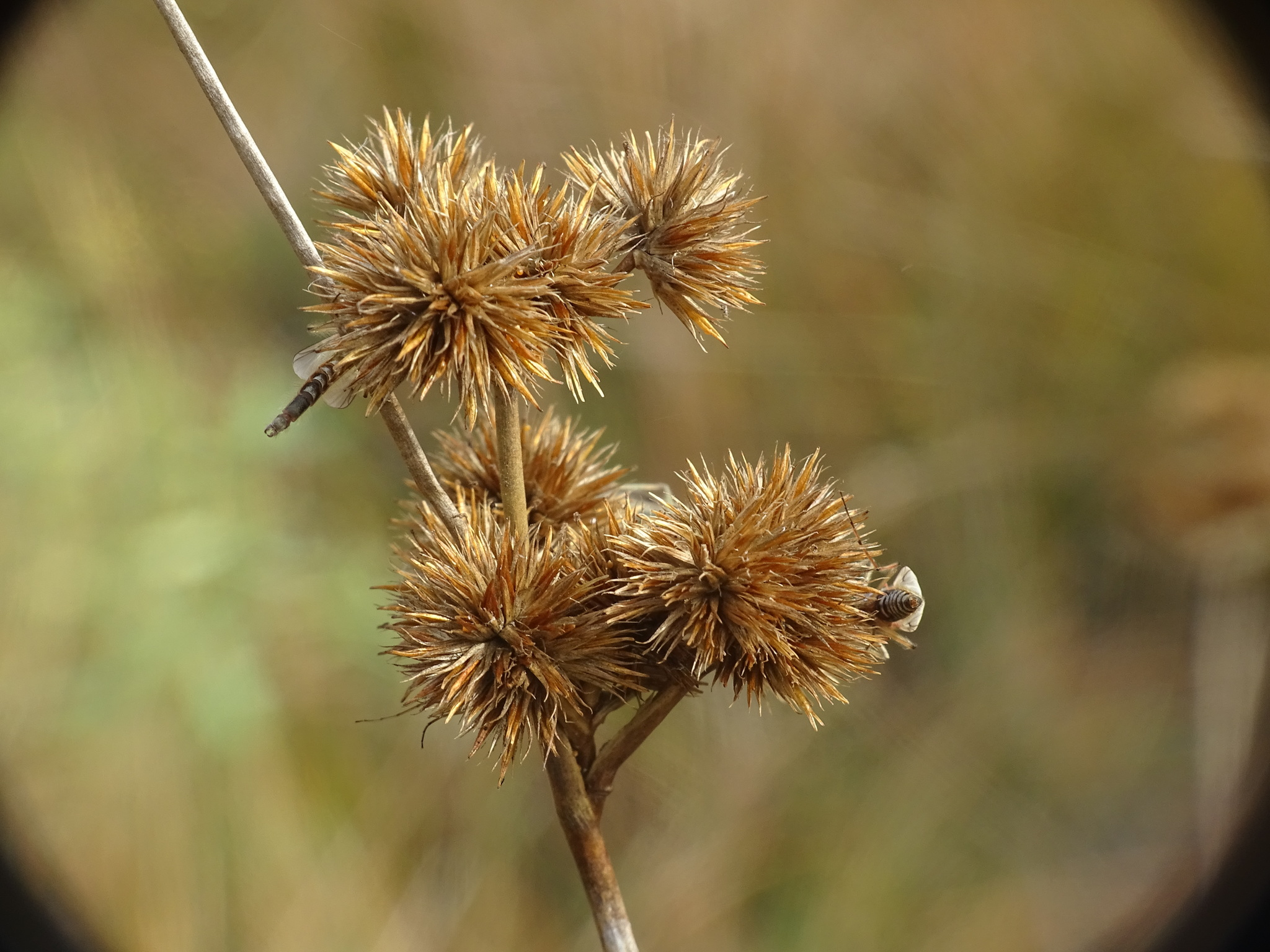

Scientific classification
- Kingdom: Plantae
- Clade: Tracheophytes
- Clade: Angiosperms
- Clade: Monocots
- Clade: Commelinids
- Order: Poales
- Family: Juncaceae
- Genus: Juncus
- Species: J. torreyi

Binomial name
- Juncus torreyi Coville

= Juncus torreyi =

Species of grass

Juncus torreyi is a species of rush known by the common name Torrey's rush. It is native to North America, where it is widespread. It can be found in many habitats across the southern half of Canada, coast to coast in the United States, and throughout northern Mexico. This is a perennial herb growing from rhizomes with associated tiny tubers. The smooth stems vary in maximum height from 30 centimeters to around a meter. The leaves are green to pink or red and up to 30 centimeters long. The inflorescences have many dense, rounded clusters of up to 100 flowers each. The flower has narrow, pointed greenish, tan, or reddish tepals and six stamens. The fruit is a pointed brown capsule.
