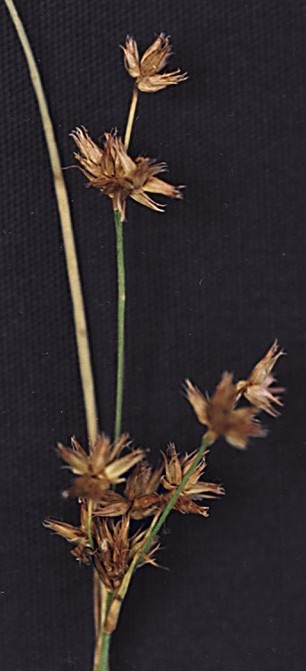

Scientific classification
- Kingdom: Plantae
- Clade: Tracheophytes
- Clade: Angiosperms
- Clade: Monocots
- Clade: Commelinids
- Order: Poales
- Family: Juncaceae
- Genus: Juncus
- Species: J. nodosus

Binomial name
- Juncus nodosus L.

= Juncus nodosus =

Species of grass

Juncus nodosus is a species of rush known by the common name knotted rush. It is native to much of North America from northern Canada to central Mexico, where it grows in wet places from freshwater to salt marsh habitat. This is a rhizomatous perennial herb producing slender, smooth stems up to about 60 centimeters tall. The inflorescence is a series of spherical clusters of flowers. Each flower has green or brown pointed segments each a few millimeters long and tapering to a point.
