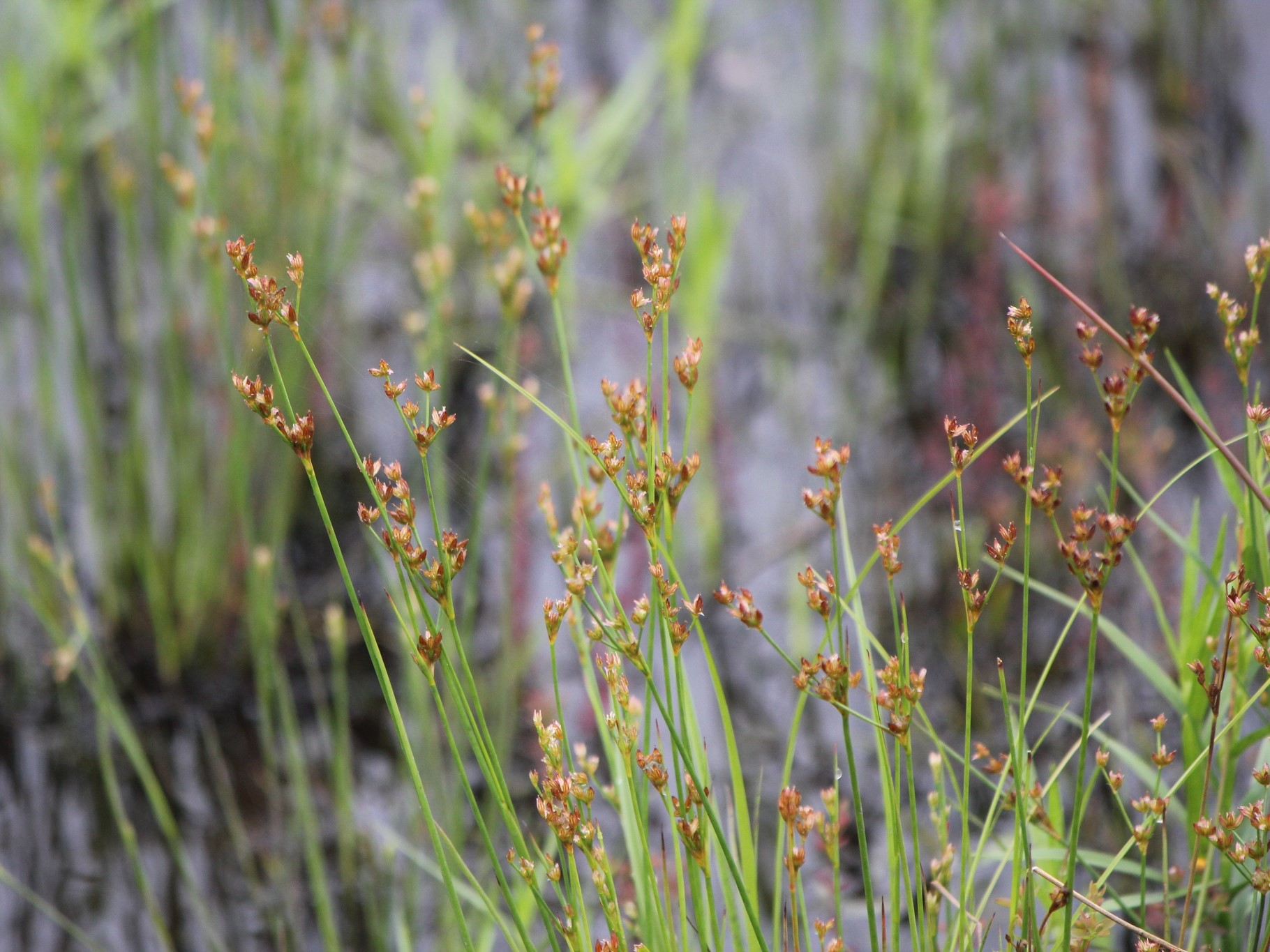

Scientific classification
- Kingdom: Plantae
- Clade: Tracheophytes
- Clade: Angiosperms
- Clade: Monocots
- Clade: Commelinids
- Order: Poales
- Family: Juncaceae
- Genus: Juncus
- Species: J. tweedyi

Binomial name
- Juncus tweedyi Rydb.

Synonyms
- Juncus brevicaudatus (Engelm.) Fernald; Juncus canadensis var. brevicaudatus Engelm.; Juncus canadensis var. coarctatus Engelm.; Juncus canadensis var. kuntzei Buchenau; Juncus coarctatus (Engelm.) Buchenau; Juncus kuntzei (Buchenau) Vierh.

= Juncus tweedyi =

Species of plant

Juncus tweedyi, the narrow-panicled rush, is a species of flowering plant in the family Juncaceae. It is native to southern Canada, and the northern USA, extending down the mountain ranges. A perennial reaching 24 in (60 cm), it is typically found in wet areas, such as the edges of beaver ponds.
