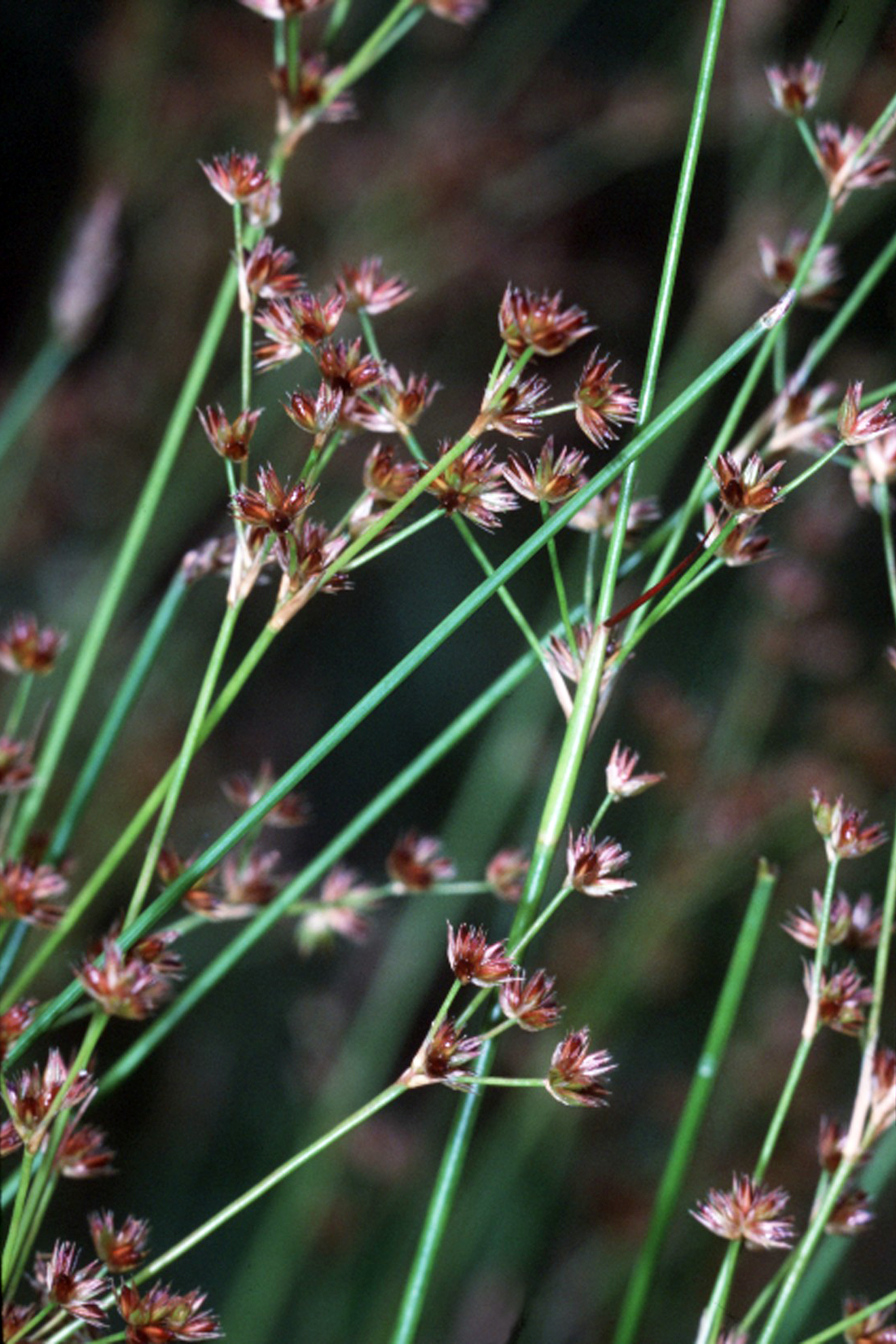

Scientific classification
- Kingdom: Plantae
- Clade: Tracheophytes
- Clade: Angiosperms
- Clade: Monocots
- Clade: Commelinids
- Order: Poales
- Family: Juncaceae
- Genus: Juncus
- Species: J. acuminatus

Binomial name
- Juncus acuminatus Michx.

= Juncus acuminatus =

Species of rush

Juncus acuminatus is a species of rush known by the common names tapertip rush, tufted rush and sharp-fruited rush. It is native to North and Central America, where it can be found in and around water bodies from central Canada to Honduras. It is a rhizomatous perennial herb forming clumps up to about 80 centimeters tall. The inflorescence is an open array of many clusters of up to 20 flowers each. The flower has pointed segments a few millimeters long which may be light reddish brown to greenish in color.
