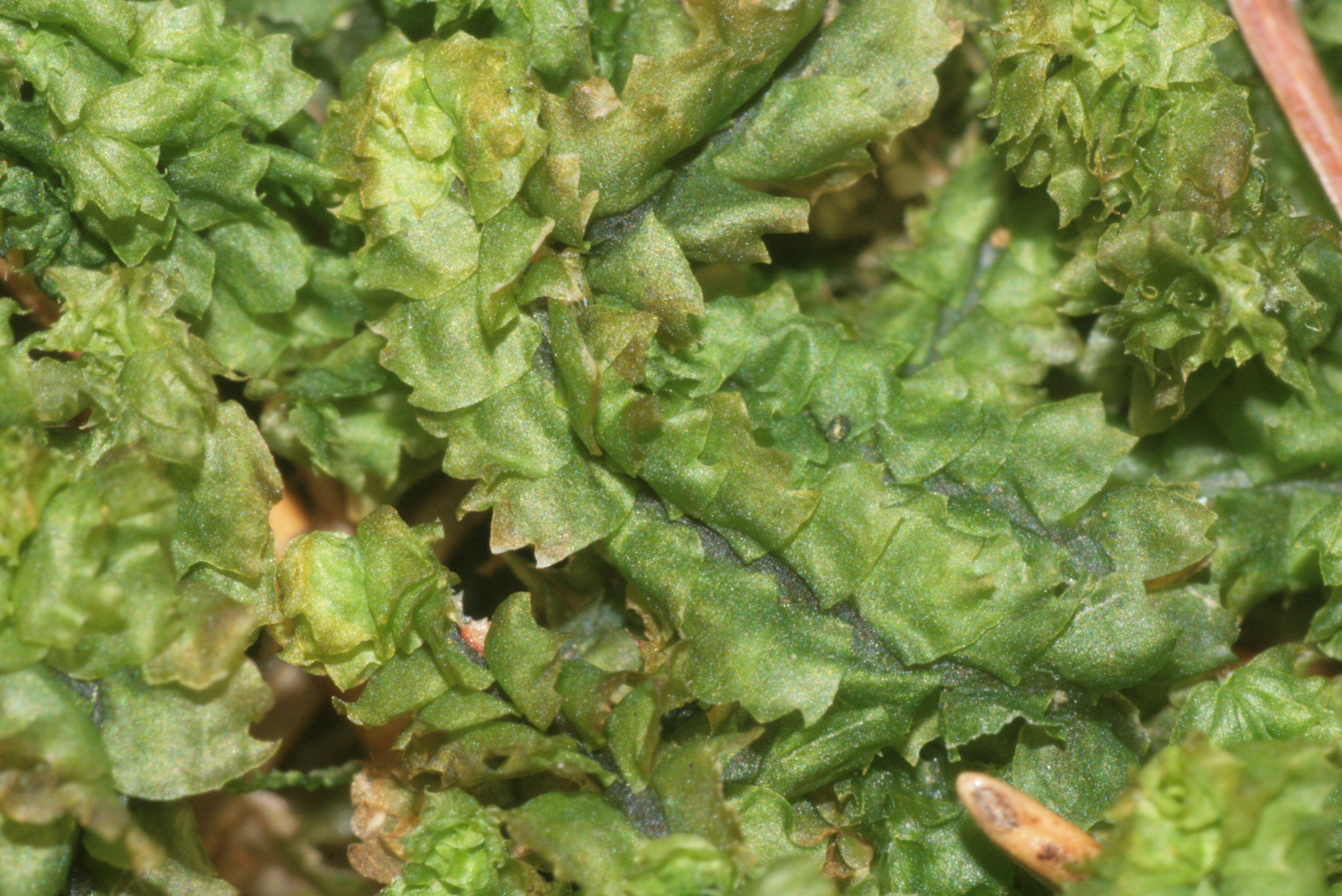

Scientific classification
- Kingdom: Plantae
- Division: Marchantiophyta
- Class: Jungermanniopsida
- Order: Lophoziales
- Family: Anastrophyllaceae
- Genus: Barbilophozia
- Species: B. barbata

Binomial name
- Barbilophozia barbata (Schreb.) Loeske

= Barbilophozia barbata =

Species of liverwort

Barbilophozia barbata is a species of liverwort belonging to the family Anastrophyllaceae.

It is native to Europe and Northern America.
