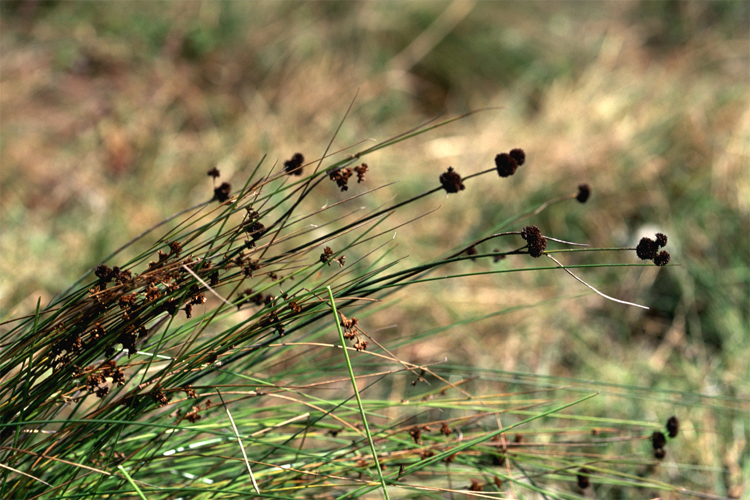

Scientific classification
- Kingdom: Plantae
- Clade: Tracheophytes
- Clade: Angiosperms
- Clade: Monocots
- Clade: Commelinids
- Order: Poales
- Family: Juncaceae
- Genus: Juncus
- Species: J. bolanderi

Binomial name
- Juncus bolanderi Engelm.

= Juncus bolanderi =

Species of grass

Juncus bolanderi is a species of rush known by the common name Bolander's rush. It is native to western North America from British Columbia to northern California, where it grows in many types of wet habitat, such as marshes, beaches, and meadows. It is a rhizomatous perennial herb forming bunches of smooth stems up to about 80 centimeters long. The inflorescence is made up of one or more clusters of many tiny flowers accompanied by one long bract. Each flower has brown, pointed segments each about 3 millimeters long.
