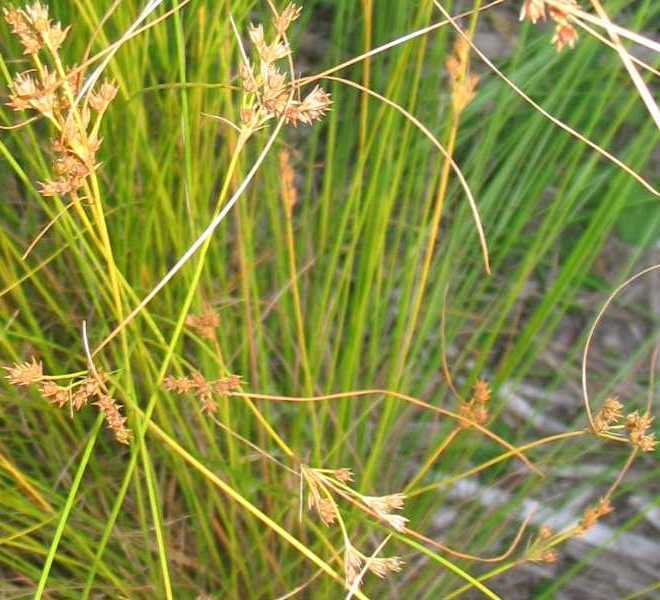

Scientific classification
- Kingdom: Plantae
- Clade: Embryophytes
- Clade: Tracheophytes
- Clade: Spermatophytes
- Clade: Angiosperms
- Clade: Monocots
- Clade: Commelinids
- Order: Poales
- Family: Juncaceae
- Genus: Juncus
- Species: J. dudleyi

Binomial name
- Juncus dudleyi Wiegand

Synonyms
- List: Juncus andreanus Weath.; Juncus coarctatus Willd. ex Spreng.; Juncus platycaulos Kunth; Juncus tenuis var. dudleyi (Wiegand) F.J.Herm.; Juncus tenuis var. platycaulos (Kunth) Buchenau; Juncus tenuis var. uniflorus Farw.

= Juncus dudleyi =

Species of flowering plant

Juncus dudleyi is a widespread species of rush native to North America, and introduced to northern South America, Japan, Great Britain and central Europe. Its diploid chromosome number is 2n=80.
