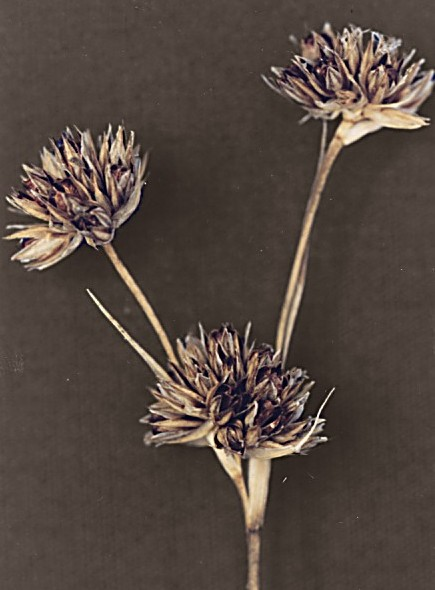

Scientific classification
- Kingdom: Plantae
- Clade: Tracheophytes
- Clade: Angiosperms
- Clade: Monocots
- Clade: Commelinids
- Order: Poales
- Family: Juncaceae
- Genus: Juncus
- Species: J. regelii

Binomial name
- Juncus regelii Buchenau

= Juncus regelii =

Species of grass

Juncus regelii is a species of rush known by the common name Regel's rush. It is native to western North America from British Columbia to Utah, where it grows in moist mountainous habitat, such as meadows. This is a rhizomatous perennial herb producing a dense clump of flattened stems up to about 60 centimeters tall. The inflorescence is made up of one or more thin or dense clusters of up to 30 flowers each. The flower has narrow, pointed brown to greenish segments.
