= Lophozia collaris =

Scientific classification
- Kingdom: Plantae
- Division: Marchantiophyta
- Class: Jungermanniopsida
- Order: Lophoziales
- Family: Lophoziaceae
- Genus: Lophozia
- Species: L. collaris

Binomial name
- Lophozia collaris (Mart.) Dumort.

Species of liverwort

Lophozia collaris is a species of liverwort belonging to the family Lophoziaceae.

It is native to Europe and Northern America.
