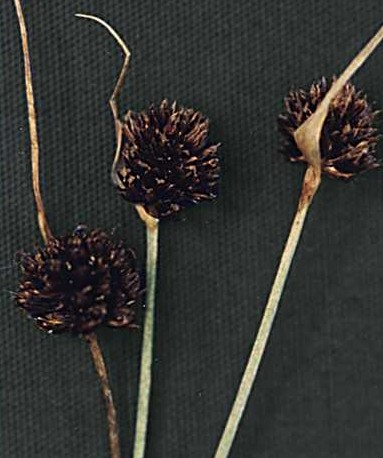

Scientific classification
- Kingdom: Plantae
- Clade: Tracheophytes
- Clade: Angiosperms
- Clade: Monocots
- Clade: Commelinids
- Order: Poales
- Family: Juncaceae
- Genus: Juncus
- Species: J. mertensianus

Binomial name
- Juncus mertensianus Bong.

Synonyms
- Juncus slwookoorum

= Juncus mertensianus =

Species of grass

Juncus mertensianus is a species of rush known by the common name Mertens' rush or Alaska rush. It is native to much of western North America from Alaska to Saskatchewan to New Mexico, where it grows in wet mountainous areas such as riverbanks and alpine meadows. This is a clumping perennial herb growing from a vertical rhizome. Its smooth, flat stems grow to a maximum height near 40 centimeters. Its few leaves are located at the base and also along the stem. The inflorescence is made up of usually one cluster of many flowers. Each flower has shiny dark brown to black tepals 3 to 4 millimeters long, six stamens with yellowish anthers, and long reddish stigmas, as in image at left. The fruit is a dark, oblong capsule, as in image at right.

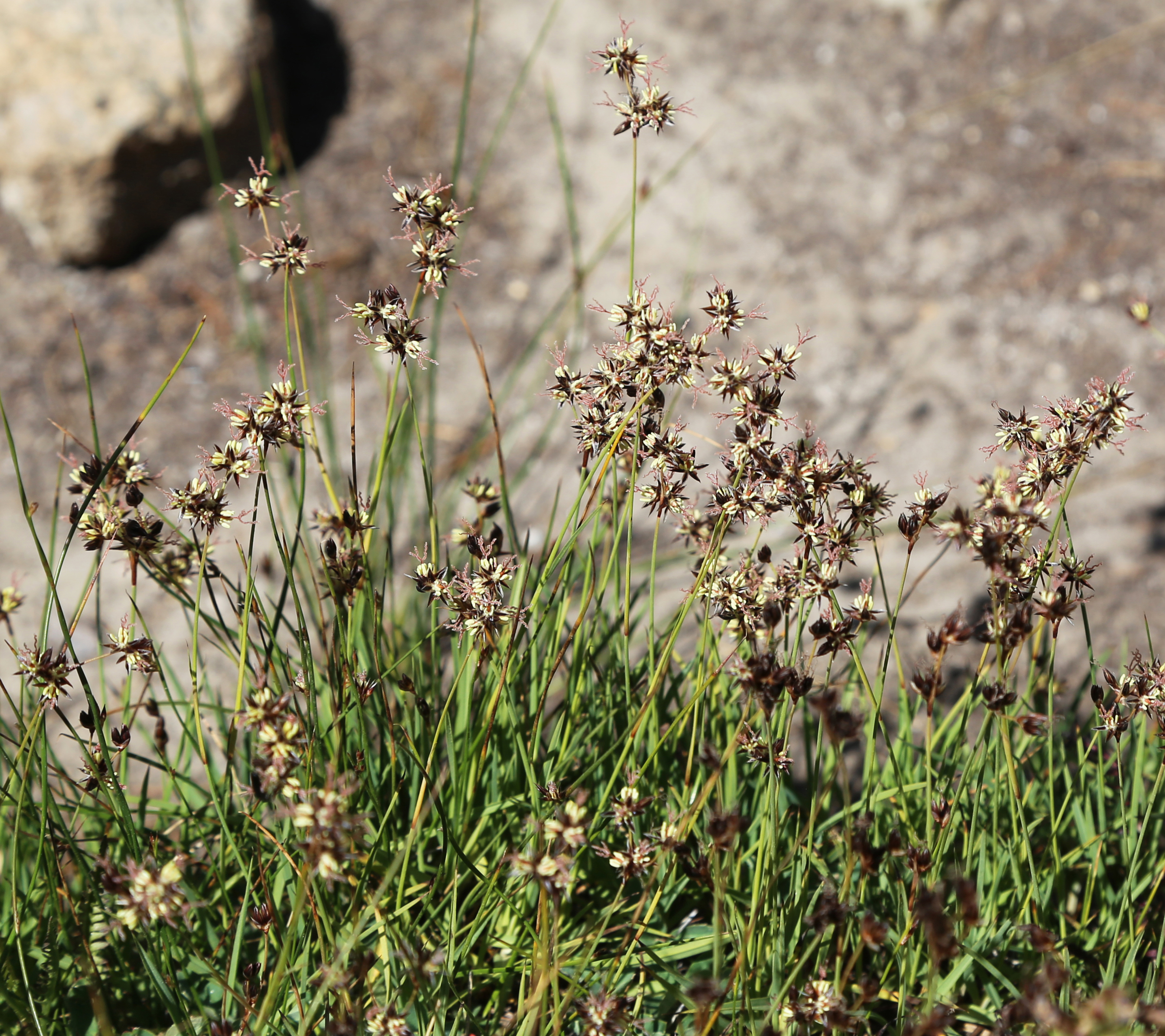
Juncus mertensianus plants in full flower at 10,400 ft (3,200 m)
