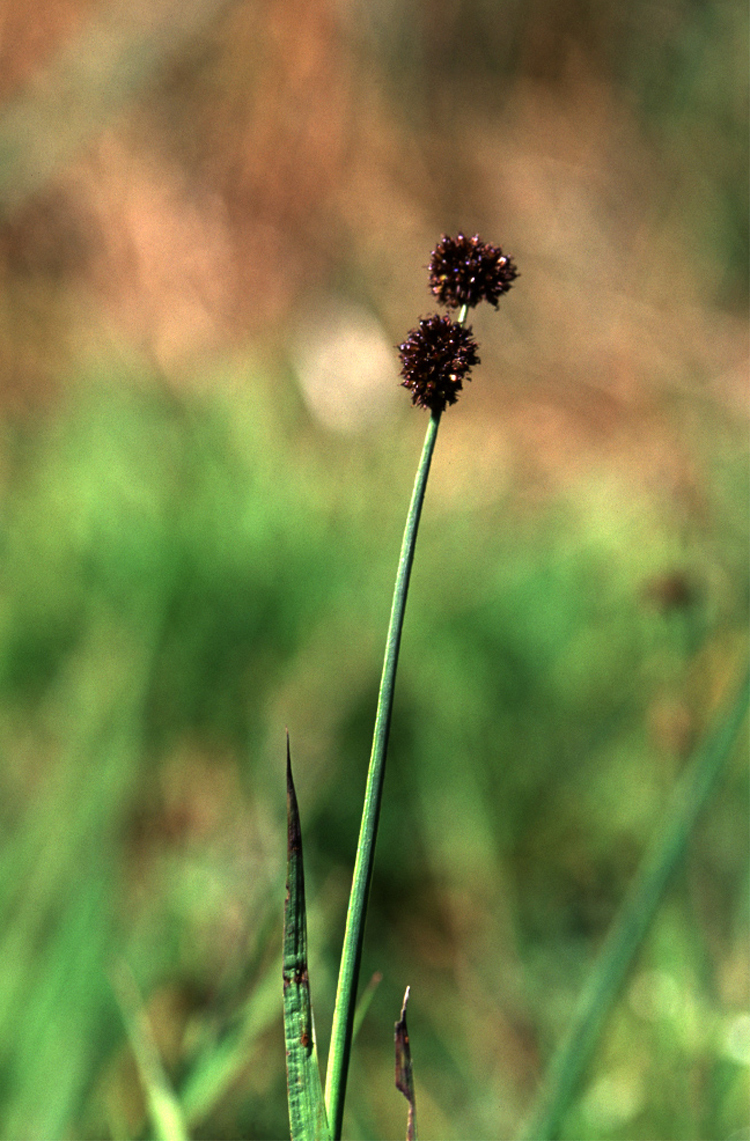

Scientific classification
- Kingdom: Plantae
- Clade: Tracheophytes
- Clade: Angiosperms
- Clade: Monocots
- Clade: Commelinids
- Order: Poales
- Family: Juncaceae
- Genus: Juncus
- Species: J. ensifolius

Binomial name
- Juncus ensifolius Wikstr.

= Juncus ensifolius =

Species of grass

Juncus ensifolius is a species of rush known by the common names swordleaf rush, sword-leaved rush, and three-stamened rush. It is native to much of western North America from Alaska to central Mexico, and into eastern Canada. It is present in Japan and far eastern Russia, and it has been introduced to many other regions of the world, including Europe, New Zealand, Hawaii, and Australia. It is a plant of wet areas in many types of habitat. This is a rhizomatous perennial herb forming clumps of stems 20 to 60 centimeters tall. The flat but curving leaves are mostly located at the base of the stems and are variable in length. The inflorescence is an array of many rounded clusters of many flowers each. Each flower has a number of dark brown to black tepals a few millimeters long and usually three small stamens enclosed between them. The fruit is an oblong capsule with a small beak on the tip.
