= Anastrophyllum =

- Anastrophyllum fissum

Scientific classification
- Kingdom: Plantae
- Division: Marchantiophyta
- Class: Jungermanniopsida
- Order: Lophoziales
- Family: Anastrophyllaceae
- Genus: Anastrophyllum (Spruce) Steph.

Type species
- Anastrophyllum donnianum (formerly Jungermannia donniana W. J. Hooker) (W. J. Hooker) Stephani

Genus of liverworts

Anastrophyllum is a genus of liverworts belonging to the family Anastrophyllaceae.

The genus has cosmopolitan distribution.

== Species ==
As accepted by the GBIF;

- Anastrophyllum acuminatum (Horik.) N.Kitag.
- Anastrophyllum adulterinum (Gottsche) Stephani
- Anastrophyllum alpinum Steph.
- Anastrophyllum ancamptum (Taylor) Stephani
- Anastrophyllum antidens Stephani
- Anastrophyllum appendiculatum N.Kitag.
- Anastrophyllum aspertifolium Stephani
- Anastrophyllum assimile (Mitt.) Steph.
- Anastrophyllum auritum (Lehm.) Steph.
- Anastrophyllum bolivianum Steph.
- Anastrophyllum borneense Herzog
- Anastrophyllum calocystum (Spruce) Stephani
- Anastrophyllum capillaceum Stephani
- Anastrophyllum cephalozioides Schiffner
- Anastrophyllum ciliatum Steph.
- Anastrophyllum conforme (Lindenb. & Gottsche) Stephani
- Anastrophyllum coriaceum (Austin) Stephani
- Anastrophyllum crebrifolium (Taylor & Hook.f.) Stephani
- Anastrophyllum cucullifolium Stephani
- Anastrophyllum cuspidatum Steph.
- Anastrophyllum decurrens Stephani
- Anastrophyllum decurvifolium (Sull.) Stephani
- Anastrophyllum divergens Herzog
- Anastrophyllum donnianum (Hook.) Steph.
- Anastrophyllum ellipticum Inoue
- Anastrophyllum erectifolium (Stephani) Stephani
- Anastrophyllum esenbeckii (Mont.) Steph.
- Anastrophyllum fissum Steph.
- Anastrophyllum gemmiferum S.Winkl.
- Anastrophyllum giganteum Stephani
- Anastrophyllum glaziovii Stephani
- Anastrophyllum gottscheanum R.M.Schust.
- Anastrophyllum graeffei J.B.Jack & Stephani
- Anastrophyllum hamatum (Gottsche & Hampe) Stephani
- Anastrophyllum harrisanum Stephani
- Anastrophyllum hians Steph.
- Anastrophyllum imbricatum (Wilson ex Gottsche, Lindenb. & Nees) Stephani
- Anastrophyllum inaequale Stephani
- Anastrophyllum incrassatum Stephani
- Anastrophyllum incumbens (Lehm. & Lindenb.) Stephani
- Anastrophyllum integerrimum Stephani
- Anastrophyllum intricatum (Lindenb. & Gottsche) R.M.Schust.
- Anastrophyllum japonicum Stephani
- Anastrophyllum joergensenii Schiffn.
- Anastrophyllum lechleri (Gottsche & Hampe) Stephani
- Anastrophyllum leptodictyon Herzog
- Anastrophyllum leucocephalum (Taylor ex Lehm.) Stephani
- Anastrophyllum leucostomum (Taylor) Stephani
- Anastrophyllum lignicola D.B.Schill & D.G.Long
- Anastrophyllum macrophyllum (Ångström) Stephani
- Anastrophyllum mandonii Stephani
- Anastrophyllum mayebarae S.Hatt.
- Anastrophyllum merrillanum Stephani
- Anastrophyllum michauxii (F.Weber) H.Buch
- Anastrophyllum microdictyon Herzog
- Anastrophyllum minutirete Herzog
- Anastrophyllum monodon (Taylor ex Lehm.) Stephani
- Anastrophyllum nigrescens (Mitt.) Steph.
- Anastrophyllum novazelandiae R.M.Schust.
- Anastrophyllum obtusatum (Hook. & Taylor) Stephani
- Anastrophyllum obtusum Herzog
- Anastrophyllum paramicola R.M.Schust.
- Anastrophyllum piligerum (Nees) Steph.
- Anastrophyllum plagiochiloides Inoue & Gradst.
- Anastrophyllum pusillum Stephani
- Anastrophyllum recurvifolium (Nees) Stephani
- Anastrophyllum revolutum Stephani
- Anastrophyllum revolvens Herzog
- Anastrophyllum rigidum Stephani
- Anastrophyllum robustum Stephani
- Anastrophyllum rovnoi Mamontov, Heinrichs & Váňa
- Anastrophyllum schismoides (Mont.) Stephani
- Anastrophyllum semifissum Stephani
- Anastrophyllum speciosum Horik.
- Anastrophyllum squarrosum Herzog
- Anastrophyllum stellatum R.M.Schust.
- Anastrophyllum striolatum (Horik.) N.Kitag.
- Anastrophyllum subcomplicatum (Lehm. & Lindenb.) Stephani
- Anastrophyllum sundaicum Schiffner
- Anastrophyllum tamurae Stephani
- Anastrophyllum tasmanicum Rodway
- Anastrophyllum tenue H.Williams
- Anastrophyllum tristanianum J.J.Engel
- Anastrophyllum tubulosum (Nees) Grolle
- Anastrophyllum vernicosum Schiffner
- Anastrophyllum verrucosum Stephani
- Anastrophyllum vitiense J.B.Jack & Stephani
- Anastrophyllum yakushimense Horik
