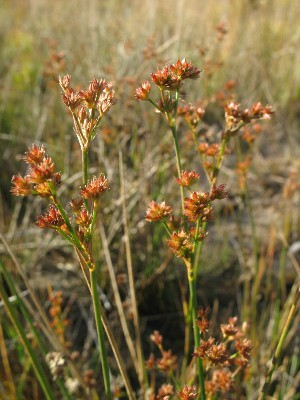
- Inflorescences
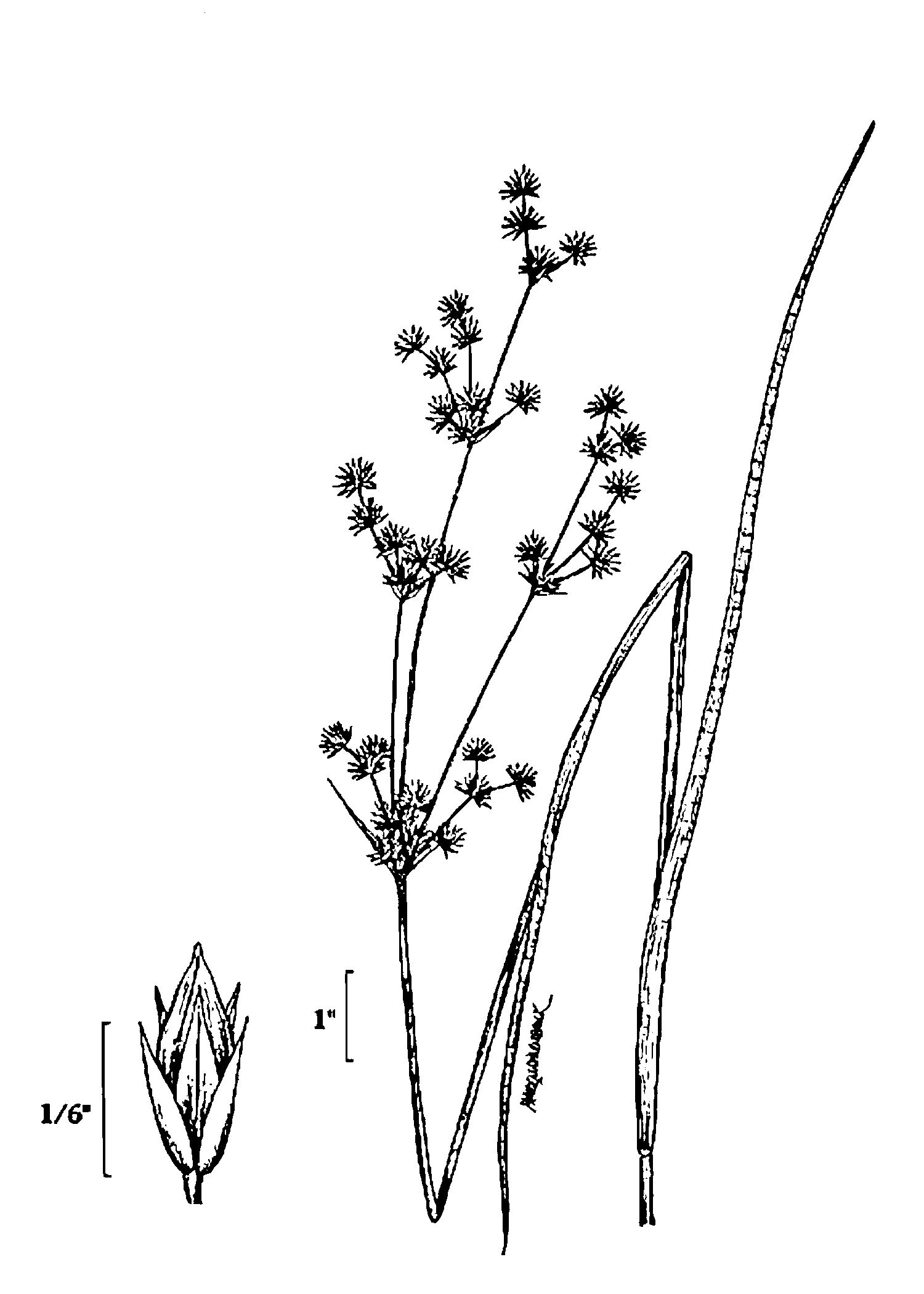
- Botanical illustration

Scientific classification
- Kingdom: Plantae
- Clade: Embryophytes
- Clade: Tracheophytes
- Clade: Spermatophytes
- Clade: Angiosperms
- Clade: Monocots
- Clade: Commelinids
- Order: Poales
- Family: Juncaceae
- Genus: Juncus
- Species: J. canadensis

Binomial name
- Juncus canadensis J.Gay ex Laharpe

Synonyms
- List: Juncus canadensis f. apertus Fernald; Juncus canadensis f. conglobatus Fernald; Juncus canadensis var. euroauster Fernald; Juncus canadensis var. longicaudatus Engelm.; Juncus canadensis var. paradoxus Farw.; Juncus canadensis var. sparsiflorus Fernald; Juncus longicaudatus (Engelm.) Mack.

= Juncus canadensis =

Species of flowering plant

Juncus canadensis, called the Canadian rush, is a species of flowering plant in the genus Juncus, native to central and eastern Canada and the central and eastern United States, and introduced to Oregon, New Zealand, and the Low Countries in Europe. It is an obligate wetland species.
