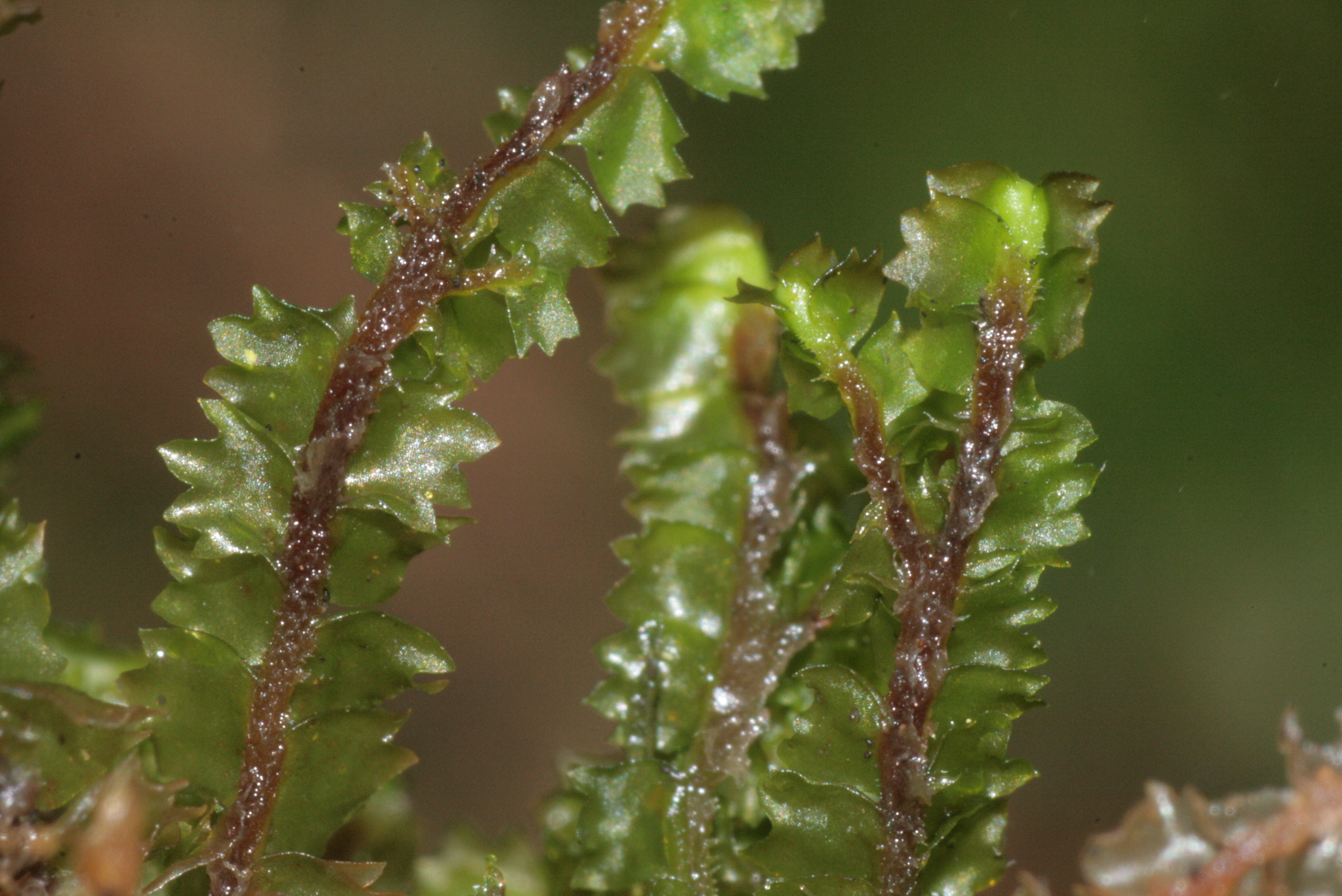
- Barbilophozia barbata

Scientific classification
- Kingdom: Plantae
- Division: Marchantiophyta
- Class: Jungermanniopsida
- Order: Lophoziales
- Family: Anastrophyllaceae; L.Söderstr.

= Anastrophyllaceae =

Family of liverworts

Anastrophyllaceae is a family of liverworts belonging to the order Jungermanniales.

== Genera ==
Genera:

- Anastrepta (Lindb.) Schiffn.
- Anastrophyllum (Spruce) Steph.
- Barbilophozia Loeske
- Biantheridion (Grolle) Konstant. & Vilnet
- Chandonanthus Mitt.
- Crossocalyx Meyl.
- Gymnocolea (Dumort.) Dumort.
- Hamatostrepta Váňa & D.G.Long
- Hattoria R.M.Schust.
- Isopaches H.Buch
- Neoorthocaulis L.Söderstr., De Roo & Hedd.
- Orthocaulis H. Buch
- Plicanthus R.M.Schust.
- Schizophyllopsis Váňa & L.Söderstr.
- Schljakovia Konstant. & Vilnet
- Schljakovianthus Konstant. & Vilnet
- Sphenolobopsis R.M.Schust. & N.Kitag.
- Sphenolobus (Lindb.) Berggr.
- Tetralophozia (R.M.Schust.) Schljakov
- Zantenia (S.Hatt.) Váňa & J.J.Engel.
