= Frederick Vernon Coville =

American botanist (1867–1937)

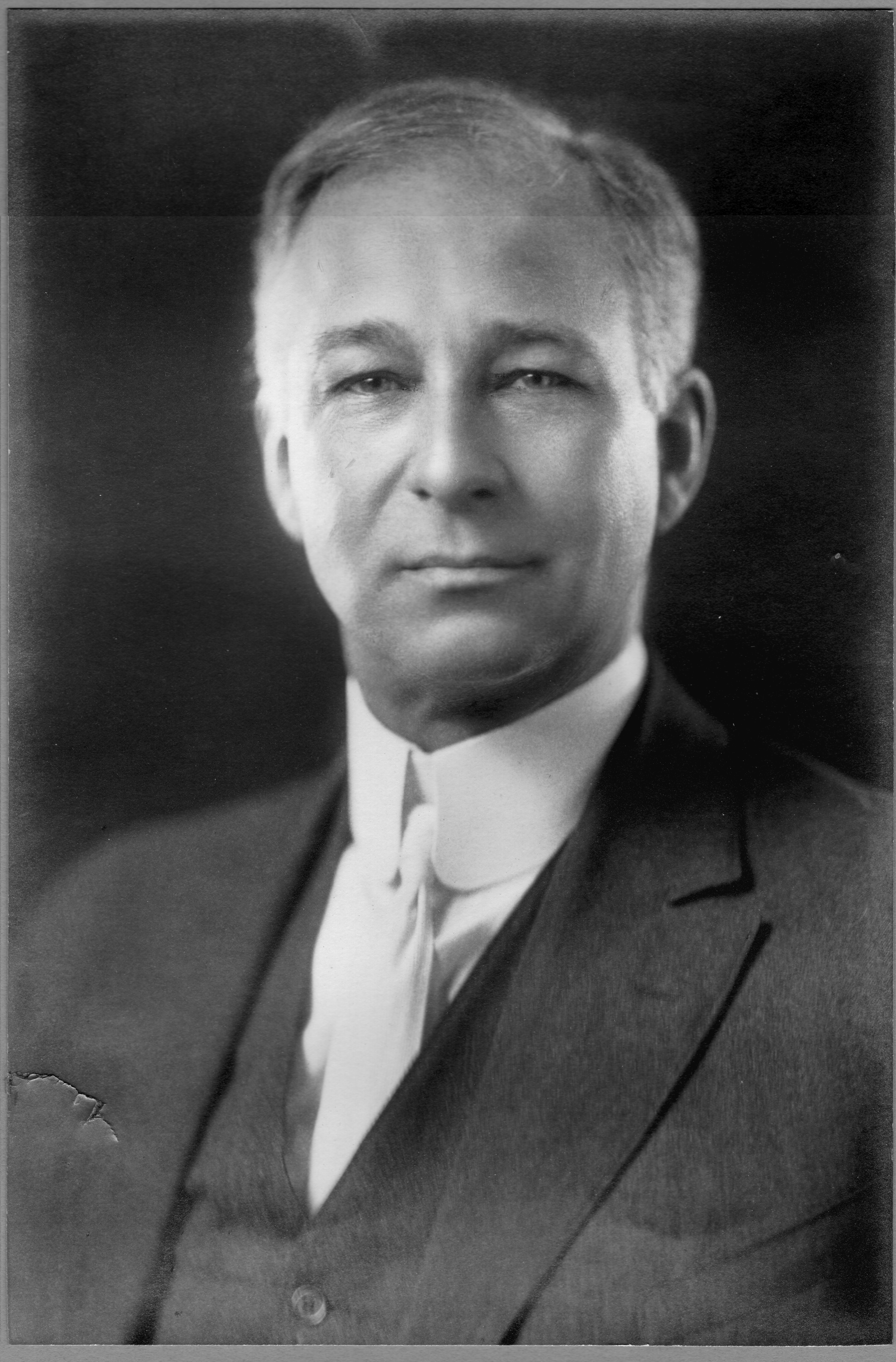
- Born: March 23, 1867; Preston, New York
- Died: January 9, 1937 (aged 69); Washington, D.C.
- Education: Cornell University
- Known for: Botany of the Death Valley Expedition, Chief Botanist of USDA, Founder of the United States National Arboretum, work on blueberry
- Spouse: Elizabeth Harwood Boyton
- Children: Five
- Parent(s): Joseph Addison and Lydia Coville
- Awards: Honorary Sc.D. from The George Washington University, George Roberts White Medal
- Scientific career
- Fields: Botany, agronomy
- Workplaces: USDA
- Author abbrev. (botany): Coville

Frederick Vernon Coville (March 23, 1867 – January 9, 1937) was an American botanist who participated in the Death Valley Expedition (1890–1891), was honorary curator of the United States National Herbarium (1893–1937), worked at then was Chief botanist of the United States Department of Agriculture (USDA), and was the first director of the United States National Arboretum. He made contribution to economic botany and helped shape American scientific policy of the time on plant and exploration research.

== Biography ==
Coville was born in 1867 in Preston, New York to bank director Joseph Addison Coville and his wife Lydia. He went to Cornell University, where he graduated with a Bachelor of Arts in 1887. He briefly taught botany before joining the USDA and participating to the Geological Survey of Arkansas as assistant botanist in 1888. He would remain with the department until his death, succeeding to George Vasey as Chief botanist in 1893, a title accompanied with that of Honorary Curator of the National Herbarium (at the time conserved at the Smithsonian Institution, but funded by the USDA). Coville married his wife, Elizabeth Harwood Boyton, in 1890; they had five children, four of whom, three sons and a daughter, survived their father. Over the course of his life, he published approximately 170 papers and books; he also contributed to botany entries of the Century Dictionary. A tall man who had enjoyed success in college sports, he was described as helpful, perceptive, clear-thinking and curious, as well as greatly enthusiastic in his outdoor expeditions.

Coville participated in the 1891 Death Valley Expedition led by C. Hart Merriam and T. S. Palmer, his resulting Botany of the Death Valley Expedition (1893) is an important work on desert plants. He traveled a lot in the Western United States and grew an interest for desert and medicinal plants. This led to activities such as 1896 research in Oregon (producing Notes on the Plants Used by the Klamath Indians of Oregon, preserving Klamath knowledge shared by their healer Muksamse'lapli) and 1897-1898 Medicinal Plants Survey. Gifford Pinchot called a report of Coville's on effects of grazing on forest "the essentials of a sound and farsighted grazing policy". Coville also participated in and wrote on the 1899 Harriman Alaska Expedition, although he never completed his Flora of Alaska. He was involved with the establishment of the Carnegie Institution's Desert Botanical Laboratory in 1903, the USDA Seed Laboratory, and spearheaded efforts that lead to the foundation of the United States National Arboretum in 1927.

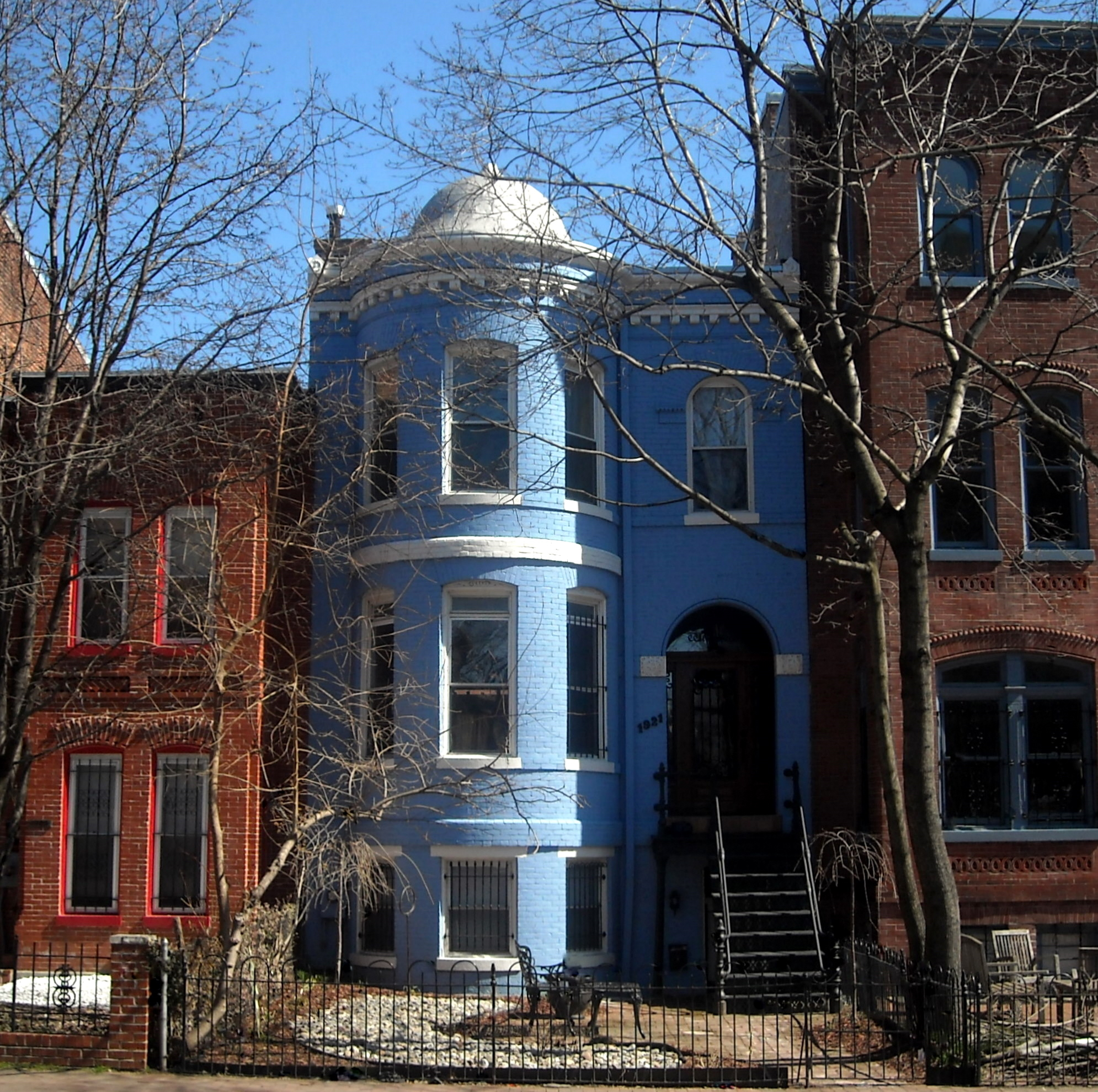
Former Washington, D.C. residence of Frederick Vernon Coville

Coville was considered the American authority on Juncaceae and Grossulariaceae. After 1910 he began to work on blueberry, and was the first to discover the importance of soil acidity (blueberries need highly acidic soil), that blueberries do not self-pollinate, and the effects of cold on blueberries and other plants. In 1911, he began a program of research in conjunction with Elizabeth White, daughter of the owner of the extensive cranberry bogs at Whitesbog in the New Jersey Pine Barrens. His work doubled the size of some strains' fruit, and by 1916, he had succeeded in cultivating blueberries, making them a valuable crop in the Northeastern United States. For this work he received the George Roberts White Medal of Honor from the Massachusetts Horticultural Society. In 1919, Coville played an instrumental role in drawing attention to the threatened state of the only known box huckleberry colony, sparking a revival of interest that led to the discovery of many new specimens of the plant. From 1920 to his death, he was chairman of the National Geographic Society' Research Committee and was very influential in deciding areas of exploration. At the time of his death he was working on a revision of Botany of the Death Valley Expedition as a flora of the Valley.

Coville's papers are split between several archives. Many (including his revision notes for Botany of the Death Valley Expedition) are kept at the Smithsonian Institution, Others at the National Arboretum. His personal library is now part of the University of Wyoming's special collections library, while his Death Valley Expedition field diary is kept at UC Berkeley. Amongst several plants named after him are Eriogonum covilleanum, Amelanchier covillei, Cheilanthes covillei, Sidalcea covillei, Enceliopsis covillei, Juncus covillei and Lupinus covillei. A genus Covillea was also named after him, but is now considered a synonym of Larrea.

== Publications ==
- Of Agriculture, United States. Dept; Herbarium, United States National; Museum, United States National (November 29, 1893). "Botany of the Death Valley Expedition. A Report on the Botany of the Expedition Sent Out in 1891 by the U.S. Department of Agriculture to Make a Biological Survey of the Region of Death Valley, California". Contributions from the U.S. National Herbarium. IV. Washington: Government Printing Office: 68.
