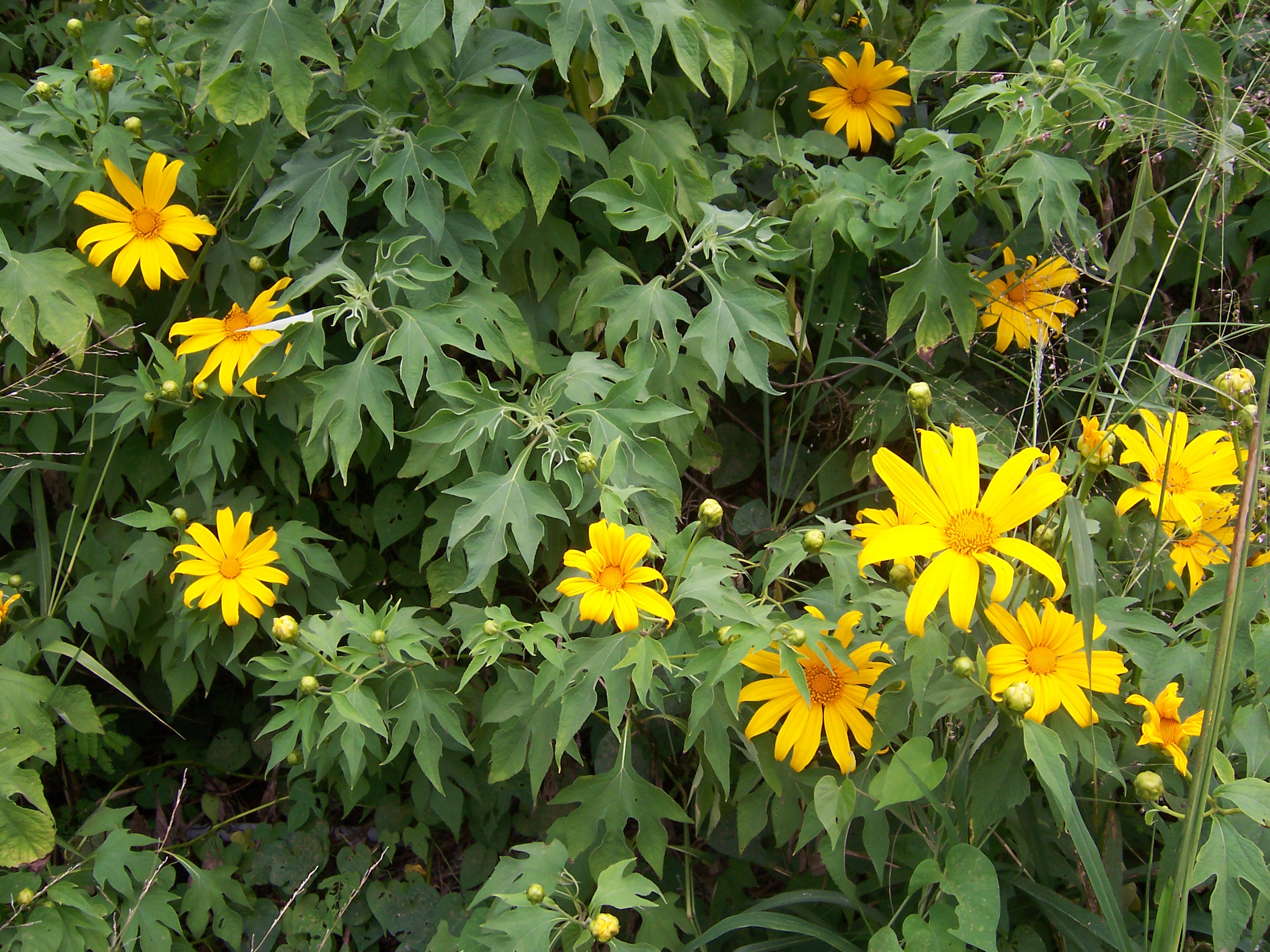
- Tithonia diversifolia

Scientific classification
- Kingdom: Plantae
- Clade: Tracheophytes
- Clade: Angiosperms
- Clade: Eudicots
- Clade: Asterids
- Order: Asterales
- Family: Asteraceae
- Subfamily: Asteroideae
- Tribe: Heliantheae
- Subtribe: Helianthinae
- Genus: Tithonia; Desf. ex Juss. 1789 not Kuntze 1891 (Phytolaccaceae)

Synonyms
- Urbanisol Kuntze; Mirasolia (Sch.Bip.) Benth.; Tithonia sect. Mirasolia (Sch.Bip.) La Duke

= Tithonia =

Genus of flowering plants

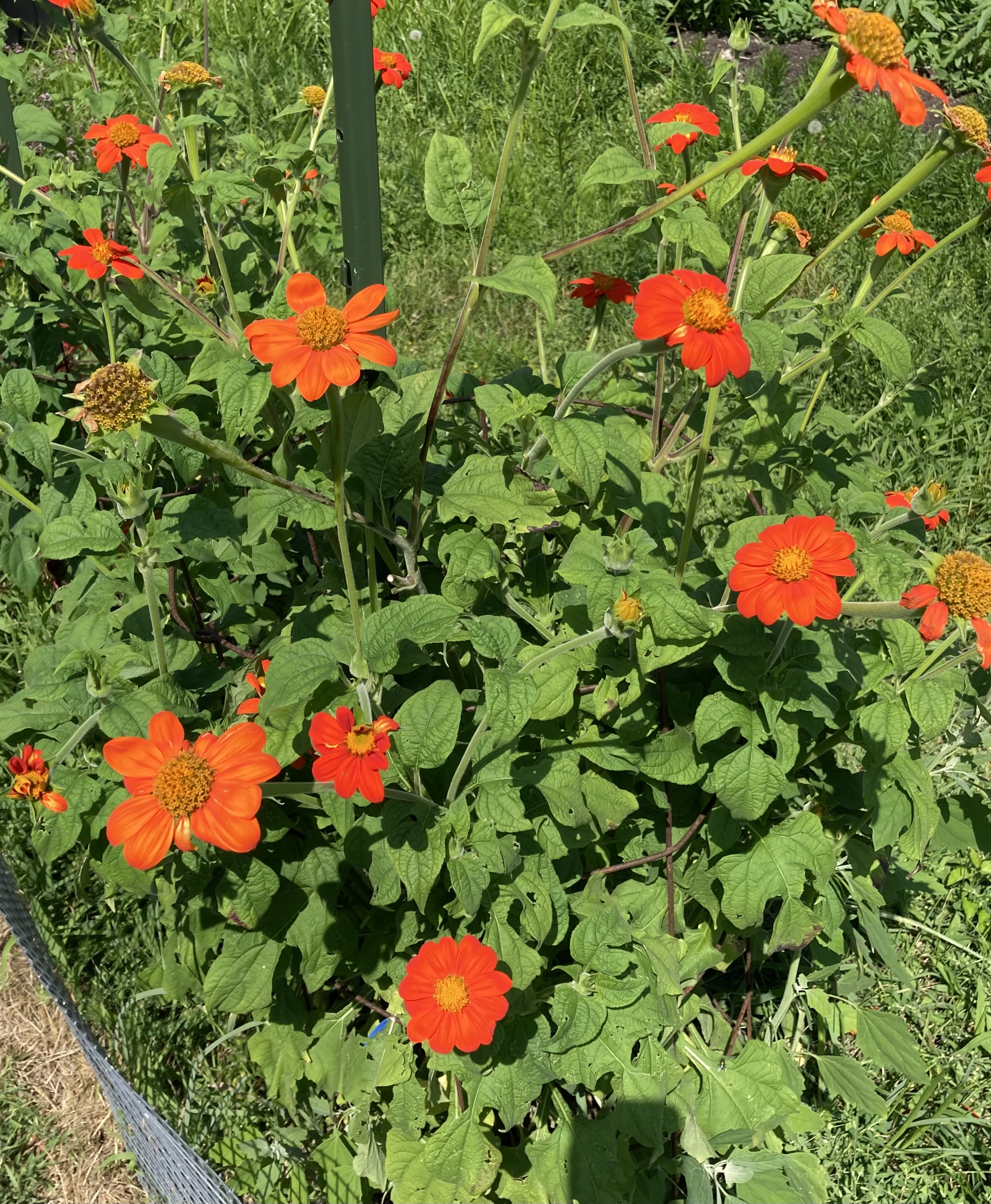
Red Tithonia

Tithonia is a genus of flowering plants in the tribe Heliantheae within the family Asteraceae.

Tithonia has a center of distribution in Mexico but with one species extending into the Southwestern United States and several native to Central America. Two species, T. diversifolia and T. rotundifolia, are widely cultivated and have escaped to become weeds in tropical and subtropical areas around the world. T. rotundifolia makes a nice fresh cut flower, flowering in mid- to late-summer in the Northern hemisphere. The distinguishing feature of the genus is the peduncle, which is fistulose (meaning hollow and flaring toward the apex). The plants are coarse annual or perennial herbs or shrubs, and one species, T. koelzii, is a small tree.

== Species ==
Plants of the World Online includes:

1. Tithonia brachypappa B.L.Rob. - San Luis Potosí
2. Tithonia calva Sch.Bip. - Durango, Sinaloa
3. Tithonia diversifolia (Hemsl.) A.Gray – tree marigold - Mexico, Central America; naturalized in Asia, Australia, Africa, South America, Florida, Texas, various oceanic islands
4. Tithonia fruticosa Canby & Rose - Chihuahua, Durango, Sonora, Sinaloa
5. Tithonia hondurensis La Duke - Belize, Honduras
6. Tithonia koelzii McVaugh - Jalisco
7. Tithonia longiradiata (Bertol.) S.F.Blake - Mexico, Central America (synonym T. pittieri (Greenm.) S.F.Blake)
8. Tithonia paneroi (B.L.Turner) E.E.Schill. & Panero
9. Tithonia pedunculata Cronquist - Oaxaca
10. Tithonia rotundifolia (Mill.) S.F.Blake - Mexico, Central America; naturalized in Florida, Louisiana, South America (synonym T. tagetiflora Desf.)
11. Tithonia thurberi Gray – Arizona sunflower weed - Chihuahua, Sonora, Arizona (Pima County)
12. Tithonia tubaeformis (Jacq.) Cass. - Mexico, Central America; naturalized in Argentina (synonym T. helianthoides Bernh.)

=== Formerly included ===
see Comaclinium, Enceliopsis, Lasianthaea, Viguiera

- Tithonia angustifolia - Viguiera angustifolia
- Tithonia argophylla - Enceliopsis argophylla
- Tithonia decurrens - Viguiera decurrens
- Tithonia excelsa - Viguiera excelsa
- Tithonia ovata - Lasianthaea helianthoides
- Tithonia pusilla - Viguiera pusilla
- Tithonia splendens - Comaclinium montanum

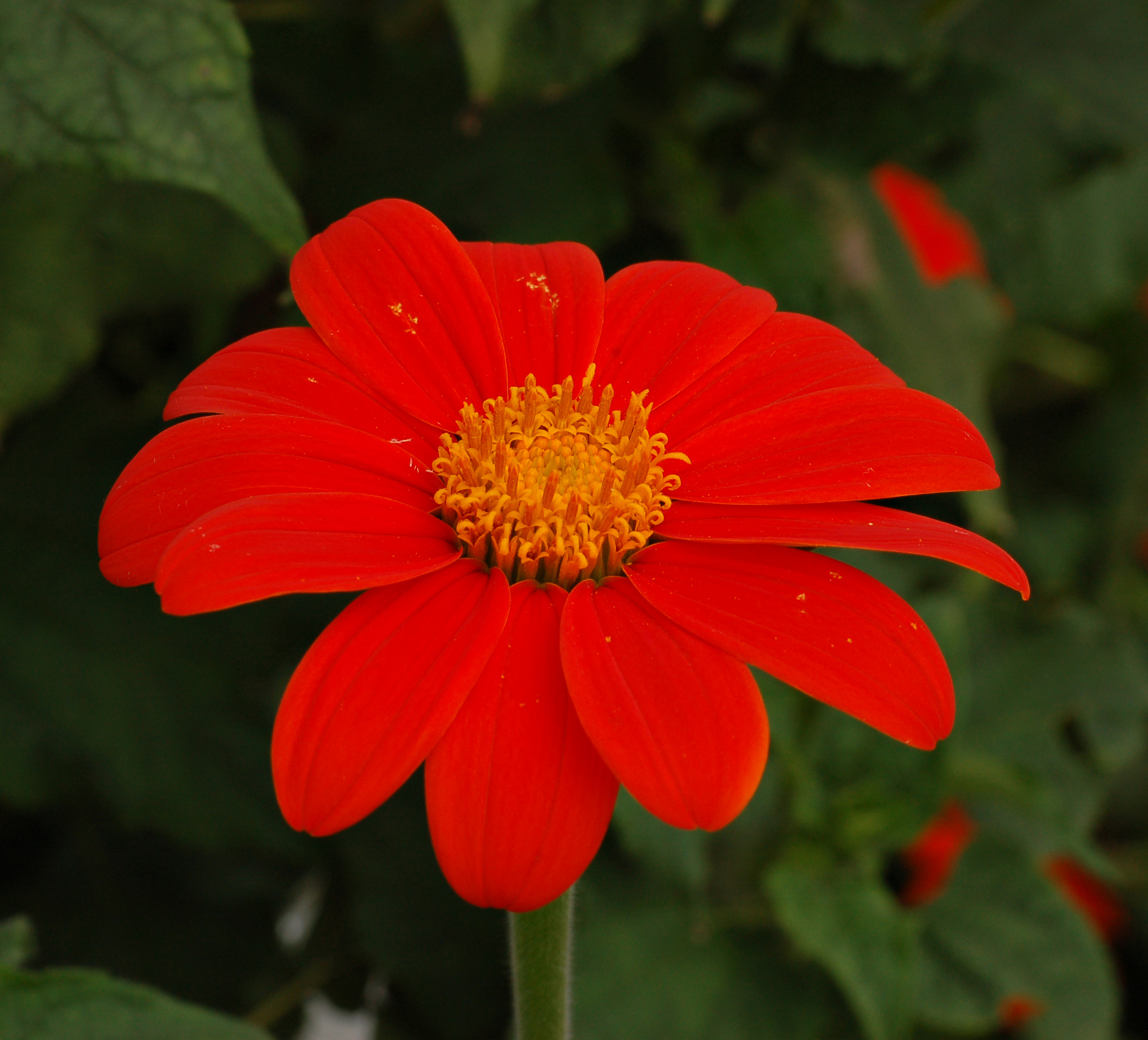
Mexican sunflower Tithonia rotundifolia

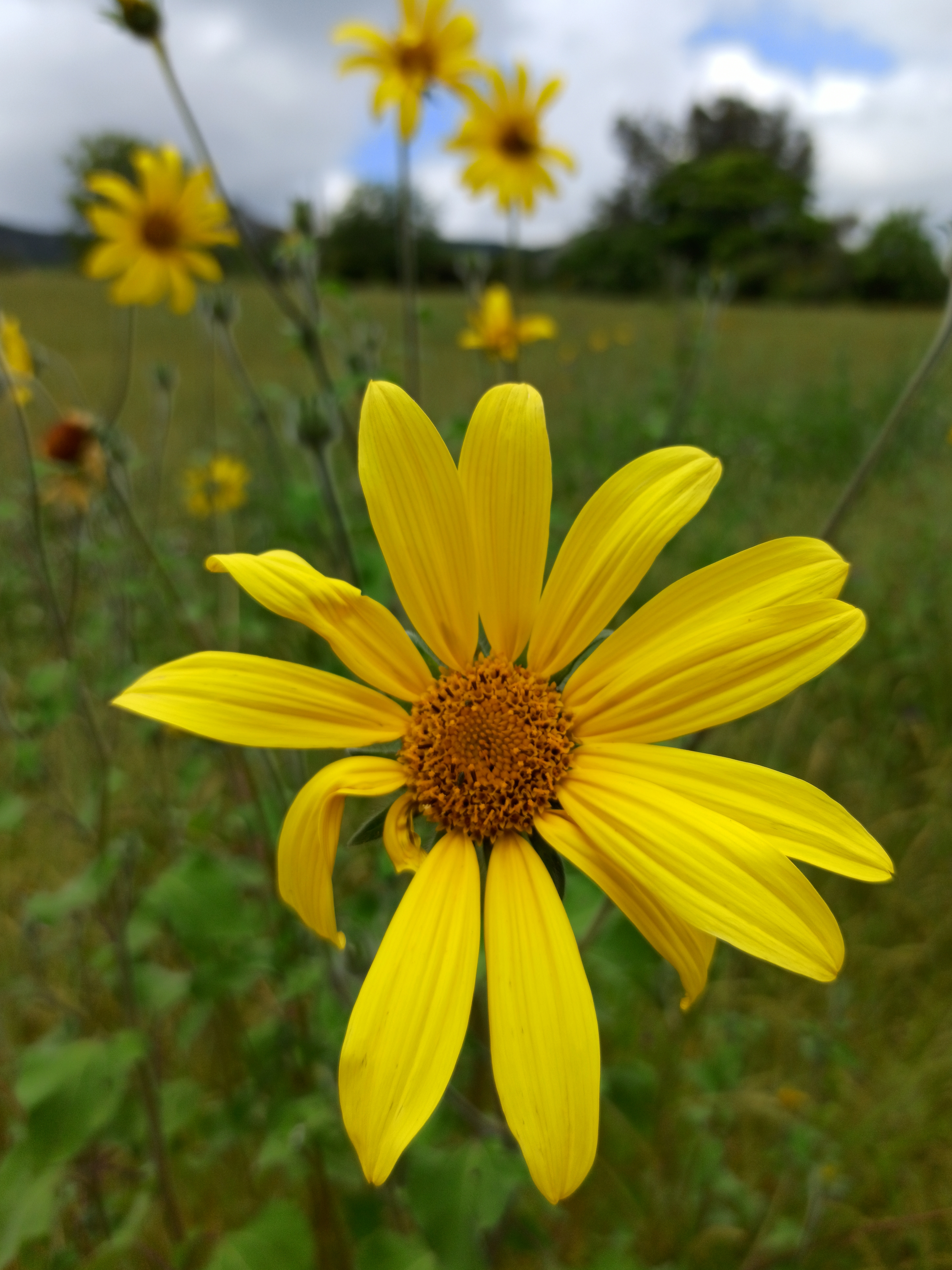
Tithonia tubaeformis
