= Red sunflower =

Red sunflower is a common name for several plants and may refer to:

- Various cultivars of Sunflower, including "Prado Red" and "Red Sun"
- Tithonia rotundifolia, native to North America
