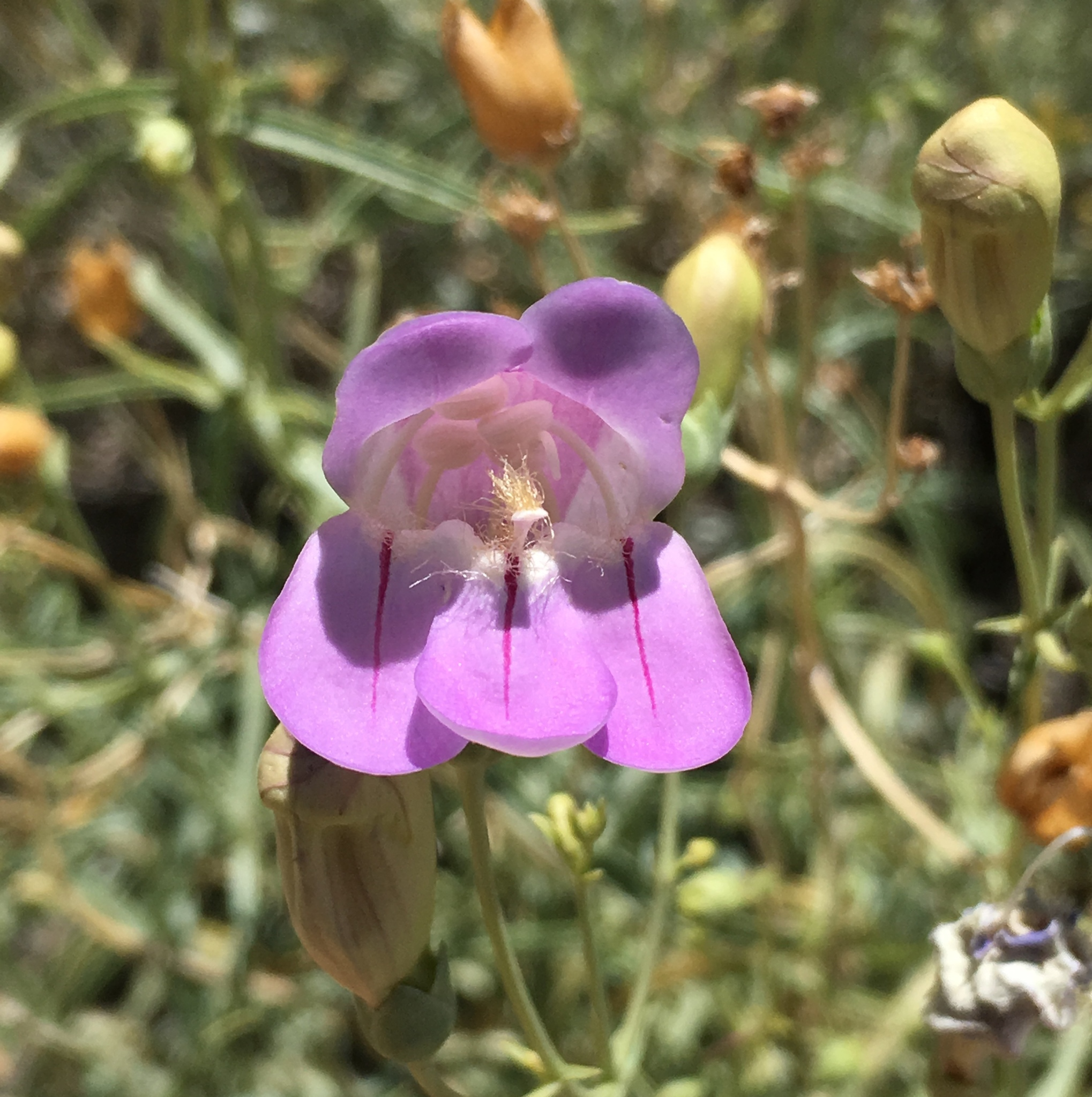

Conservation status
- Apparently Secure (NatureServe)

Scientific classification
- Kingdom: Plantae
- Clade: Tracheophytes
- Clade: Angiosperms
- Clade: Eudicots
- Clade: Asterids
- Order: Lamiales
- Family: Plantaginaceae
- Genus: Penstemon
- Species: P. fruticiformis

Binomial name
- Penstemon fruticiformis Coville

Varieties
- P. fruticiformis var. amargosae (D.D.Keck) N.H.Holmgren; P. fruticiformis var. fruticiformis

= Penstemon fruticiformis =

Plant species in the veronica family

Penstemon fruticiformis is a species of penstemon known by the common name Death Valley penstemon. It is native to the western United States, where it is found growing in rocky scrub, woodlands, deserts and mountains of eastern California and western Nevada. It is known from scattered occurrences around Death Valley, and only one of the two varieties occurs on the Nevada side of the border.

== Description ==
Penstemon fruticiformis is a plant that grows as a shrub or subshrub, having stems that are at least partly woody, that grows to between 30 and 60 centimeters (1 and 2 ft) tall. The stems branch frequently near the base of the plant and is typically wider than it is tall. Young stems are hairless and generally glaucous, covered in natural waxes giving a gray-blue color.

The thick leaves are generally rolled inward or folded lengthwise. All the leaves are cauline, attached to the stems with none directly from the base of the plants. Usually the leaf edges are smooth, but rarely they may be serrulate, having very fine forward pointing asymmetrical teeth, though only towards their ends. There are six to twelve pairs of leaves attached to each stem on opposite sides, each 1.2 to 6.5 centimeters in length, though usually longer than 2.5 cm.

The hairless inflorescences are 8 to 30 centimeters (3.1 to 11.8 in) at the ends of the stem with three to eight groups of flowers each accompanied by a pair of bracts nearby. In the group each cyme will have one to three flowers. The flower color is variously described as white to pale pink-lavender, blue-lavender to light pink, pale peach, and rose-colored to white with blue lobes or lavender with purple lobes. They typically measure 2.2 to 2.8 centimeters long. The mouth of the flower has stark, reddish purple nectar guides.

== Taxonomy ==
The scientific name and description of Penstemon fruticiformis was published by Frederick Vernon Coville in 1893. It is part of the Penstemon genus in family Plantaginaceae. The type specimen was collected from Wild Rose Canyon in the Panamint Range.

=== Varieties ===
The species has two varieties.

==== Penstemon fruticiformis var. amargosae ====
Initially described as a subspecies, variety amargosae has flowers that are more or less glandular-pubescent externally. The lobes of it sepals also have an average greater length, ranging from 4.5 to 6.5 millimeters. The glandular hairs are more easily seen on flower buds than on blooming flowers. In addition to being known by the same common names as the species as a whole it is also known as Amargosa penstemon.

==== Penstemon fruticiformis var. fruticiformis ====
The antonymic variety has flowers that are hairless externally and a shorter range of sepal lengths, 3.5 to 5 millimeters, though this does overlap with var. amargosae. It only grows in Inyo County, California. It is occasionally known as the desert bush penstemon.

=== Synonyms ===
Penstemon fruticiformis has three synonyms:

Table of Synonyms
| Name | Year | Rank | Synonym of: | Notes |
|---|---|---|---|---|
| Penstemon fruticiformis subsp. amargosae D.D.Keck | 1937 | subspecies | var. amargosae | ≡ hom. |
| Penstemon fruticiformis var. spiciformis Jeps. | 1925 | variety | var. fruticiformis | ≡ hom. |
| Penstemon fruticiformis subsp. typicus D.D.Keck | 1937 | subspecies | P. fruticiformis | = het. not validly publ. |
Notes: ≡ homotypic synonym; = heterotypic synonym

=== Names ===
The botanical Latin species name fruticiformis means "shaped like a bush". In English the species is known as Death Valley penstemon. It is additionally known as desert mountain penstemon.

== Range and habitat ==
The natural range of the species as a whole is limited to small areas of California and Nevada. Variety amargosae grows in three counties, Inyo and San Bernardino counties in California and Nye County, Nevada. Variety fruticiformis is limited to just Inyo County.

Both varieties grow in creosote bush shrublands, but only variety fruticiformis is also associated with gravelly arroyos, canyon floors, and pinyon-juniper woodlands.

=== Conservation ===
Death Valley penstemon was evaluated by NatureServe in 1997 and they rated it as apparently secure (G4) for the species as a whole. However, in the state of Nevada they rated it imperiled (S2) while not evaluating the security of the species in California.

== See also ==
- List of Penstemon species
