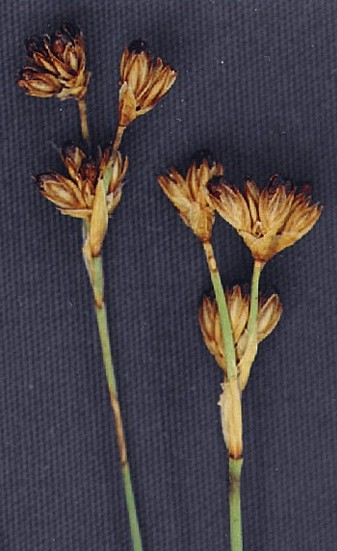

Conservation status
- Secure (NatureServe)

Scientific classification
- Kingdom: Plantae
- Clade: Tracheophytes
- Clade: Angiosperms
- Clade: Monocots
- Clade: Commelinids
- Order: Poales
- Family: Juncaceae
- Genus: Juncus
- Species: J. covillei

Binomial name
- Juncus covillei Piper

= Juncus covillei =

Species of grass

Juncus covillei is a species of rush known by the common name Coville's rush native to North America.

== Taxonomy ==
Juncus covillei was first described by Charles Vancouver Piper in Contributions from the United States National Herbarium 11: 182. 1906.

=== Etymology ===
Juncus: the generic name was derived from the Latin word jungere meaning "to unite or bind", which comes from the fact that the stems join or intertwine.

colvillei: the species was named in honor of American botanist Frederick Vernon Coville.

== Distribution ==
It is native to western North America from British Columbia to Idaho to California, where it grows in moist habitat, often in forested areas. Including along lakes, rivers and streams, especially on occasionally flooded areas.

== Description ==
This is a perennial herb forming clumps of erect stems up to about 25 centimeters tall from a thick rhizome. The inflorescence is made up of several clusters of brown or green flowers. The flat leaves are blue-green in color. There are 2 to 6 clusters on the plant and 3 to 7 flowers in a cluster. The flowers have six brown tepals. The plump capsules are either equal to or longer than the tepals. 2n equals either 36 or 38. The bloom time is from June to September.
