= Muksamse'lapli =

American healer

Muksamse'lapli, also known as White Cindy (ca. 1845-1919), was a Klamath healer and shaman, understood now to be under Two-spirit identity umbrella.

== Life ==
Muksamse'lapli was born around 1845 on Klamath land, assigned male at birth. Muksamse'lapli likely started cattle ranching young, following Klamath tribes ceding over twenty-three million acres to the settlers in 1864, later living on a small ranch on the shore of Agency Lake, in Oregon, close to the Klamath Reservation. By the 1860s, Muksamse'lapli's feminine gender expression was noted.

In 1870, Klamath were forceed to relocate to a nearby reservation by settlers, with Muksamse'lapli leading a group of six women and helping them against the wishes of a man named “Mountain Pete.” Pete reacted with a knife, being stopped by another Klamath from killing Muksamse'lapli.

Muksamse'lapli's knowledge of healing and botany were respected and sought after by both Klamath and non-Native botanists seeking knowledge of local plants, such as Frederick Vernon Coville compiling Notes on the Plants Used by the Klamath Indians of Oregon in 1896. Muksamse'lapli's other activities included basket weaving, fire eating, whiskey smuggling, dance, cooking, and cattle ranching.

Muksamse'lapli was arrested and jailed for violent altercations with Klamath people on the reservation several times, though in some of these cases the plea was self-defense. One of those happened following the assault on Frank Jack from Link River on October 23, 1904. Muksamse’lapli admitted to hitting him with a rock following an argument over whisky they transported, pleaded guilty and paid a fifty-dollar fine. On May 31, 1914, elderly Muksamse’lapli was accused of supposedly "swinging Peter Philips around by his tie". By June 6, authorities freed Muksamse’lapli when the investigators learned the man had died from a heart attack instead.

Muksamse'lapli was married twice, first to a Molala man named Tcĭ’ptcĭ, second to a man named Tc!o’mŏks. Later settler records report marriage to a man named Blaine Ben Johns, and that Muksamse'lapli would at some time self-describe as "a widow".

Muksamse’lapli died from old age in 1919, with most of the reporting and memorializing being done after 1950, by white Klamath Falls residents who remembered the healer.

== Gender identity ==
Muksamse'lapli was assigned male at birth, but is referred to in most historical and contemporary accounts as a woman or transvestite. Muksamse'lapli used phrases and words such as "half she and half he", "female" and a unique Klamath subject pronoun Ämmä’ri (well-dressed), while the settlers would use "she/her" pronouns.
