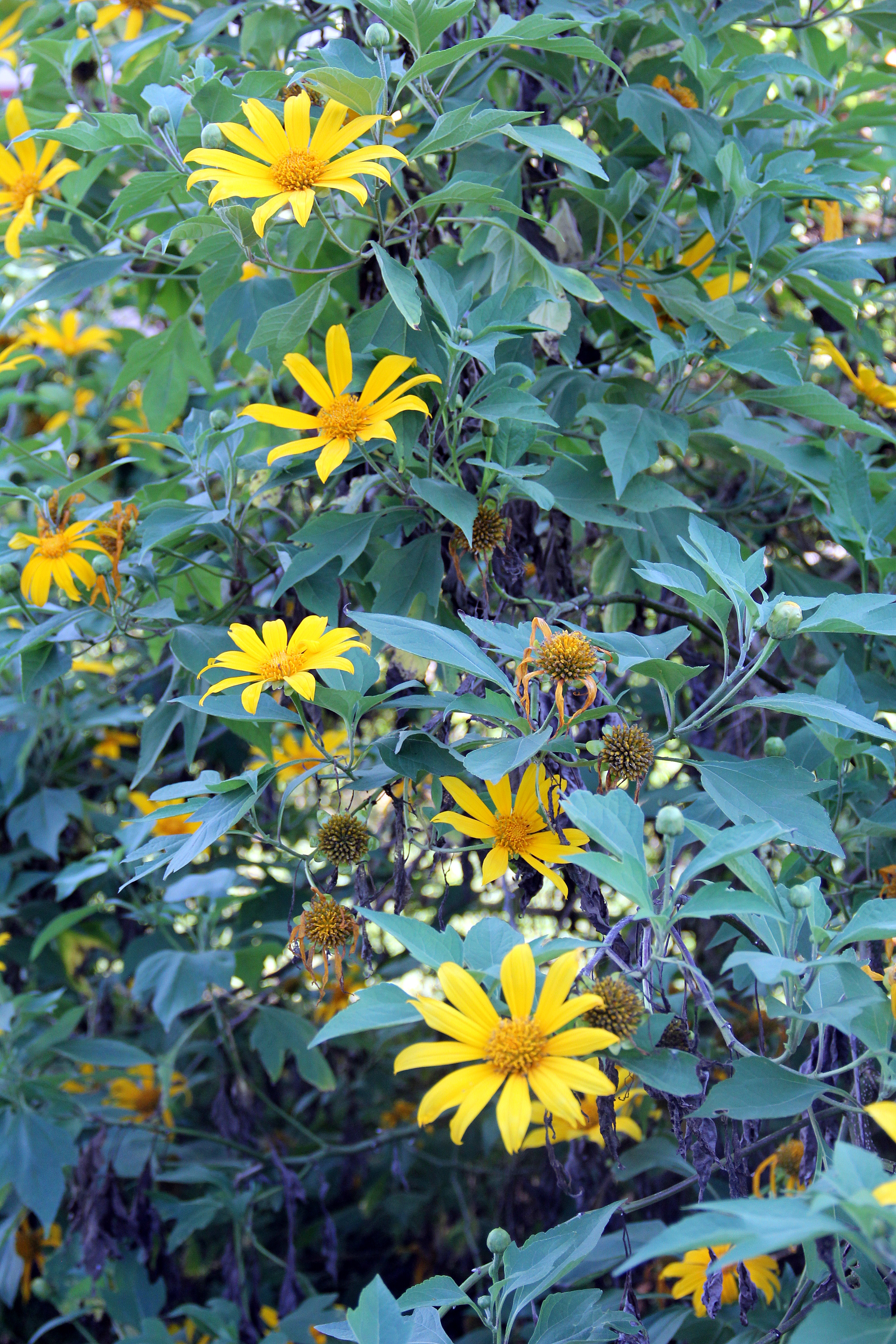

Scientific classification
- Kingdom: Plantae
- Clade: Embryophytes
- Clade: Tracheophytes
- Clade: Spermatophytes
- Clade: Angiosperms
- Clade: Eudicots
- Clade: Asterids
- Order: Asterales
- Family: Asteraceae
- Tribe: Heliantheae
- Genus: Tithonia
- Species: T. diversifolia

Binomial name
- Tithonia diversifolia (Hemsl.) A.Gray

Synonyms
- Mirasolia diversifolia Hemsl.

= Tithonia diversifolia =

Species of flowering plant

Tithonia diversifolia is a species of flowering plant in the family Asteraceae that is commonly known as the tree marigold, Mexican tournesol, Mexican sunflower, Japanese sunflower or Nitobe chrysanthemum. It is native to Mexico and Central America but has a nearly pantropical distribution as an introduced species. Depending on the area they may be either annual or perennial. It has shown great potential in raising the soil fertility in soils depleted in nutrients.

Research has shown its potential in benefiting poor African farmers. This plant is a weed that grows quickly and has become an option as an affordable alternative to expensive synthetic fertilizers. It has shown to increase plant yields and the availability of soil nutrients such as nitrogen (N), phosphorus (P), and potassium (K).

== Description ==
Tithonia diversifolia is 2–3 m (6.6–9.8 ft) in height with upright and sometimes ligneous stalks in the form of woody shrubs. Leaves are sub-ovate, serrate, acute, 10 to 40 cm long, simply or mostly 3-7 lobed, somewhat glandular, and slightly grayish beneath. The leaves of the plant alternate in sides they grow on, which is where the plant gets the name diversifolia.

The large, showy honey-scented flowers are yellow to orange colored, 5–15 cm wide and 10–30 cm long. Flowering occurs mostly from April to June. Its seeds are spread through way of wind, water, and animals. The seeds are achenes, 4-angled, and 5mm long.

== History and geography ==
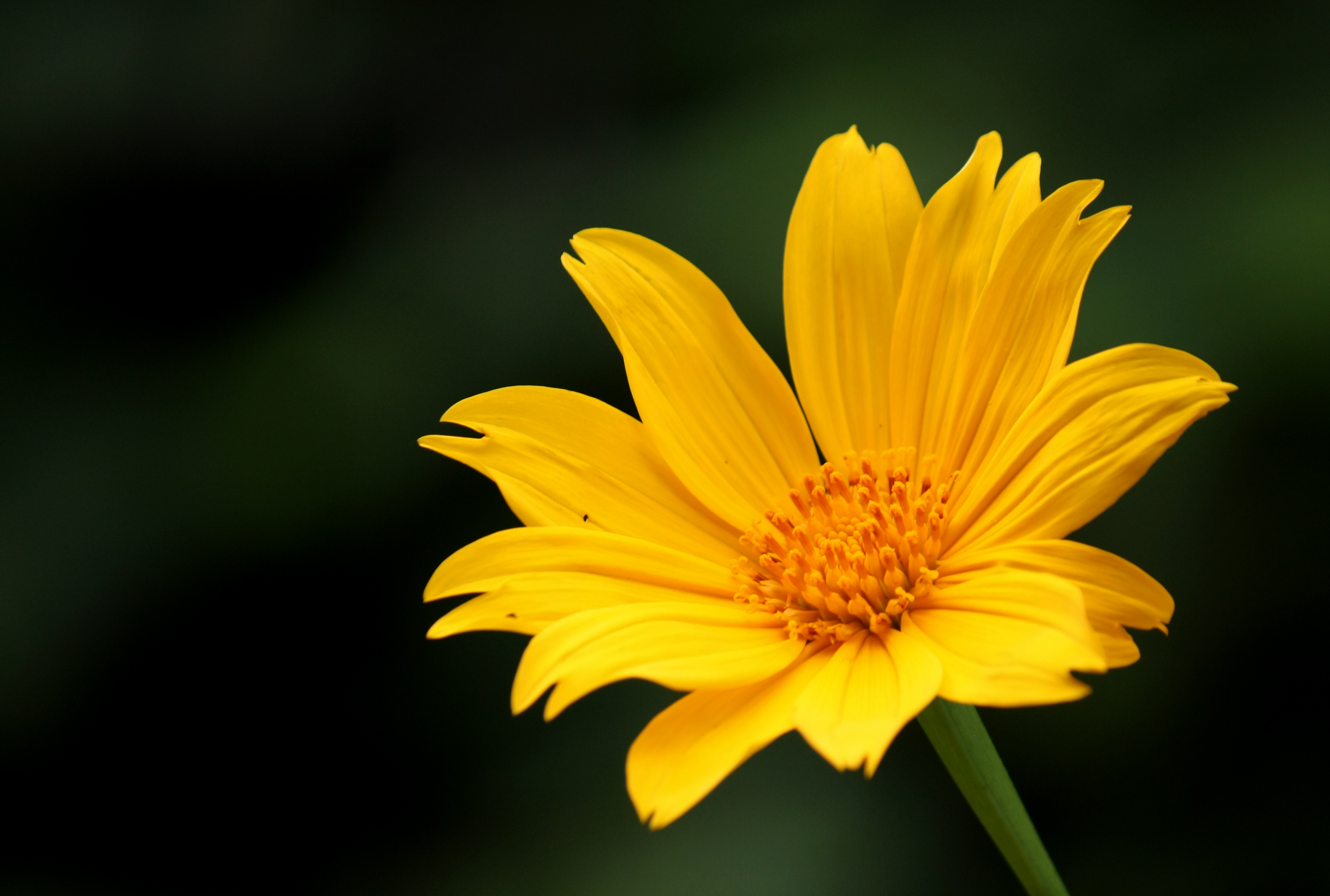
Flower detail

This plant was originally domesticated in Mexico and spread to other parts of Central and South America and north into the United States. It was brought over to parts of Africa and Asia as an ornamental plant and has become an invasive weed that is widely spread. It is most commonly found in areas with an altitude between 550m and 1950m. It is commonly found scattered among rivers and roadsides.} In Asia and Latin America this plant is also referred to as kembang bulan (Indonesian and Javanese), jalacate (Spanish), buatong (Thai) and dã quỳ (Vietnamese).

While T. diversifolia has moderate drought tolerance, the amount of rainfall that the African subtropics receives may not be enough to support the growing of this biomass. T. diversifolia currently grows in humid and semi humid areas in Africa. However, no evidence was found to suggest that it had been attempted in desert conditions.

== Cultivation ==
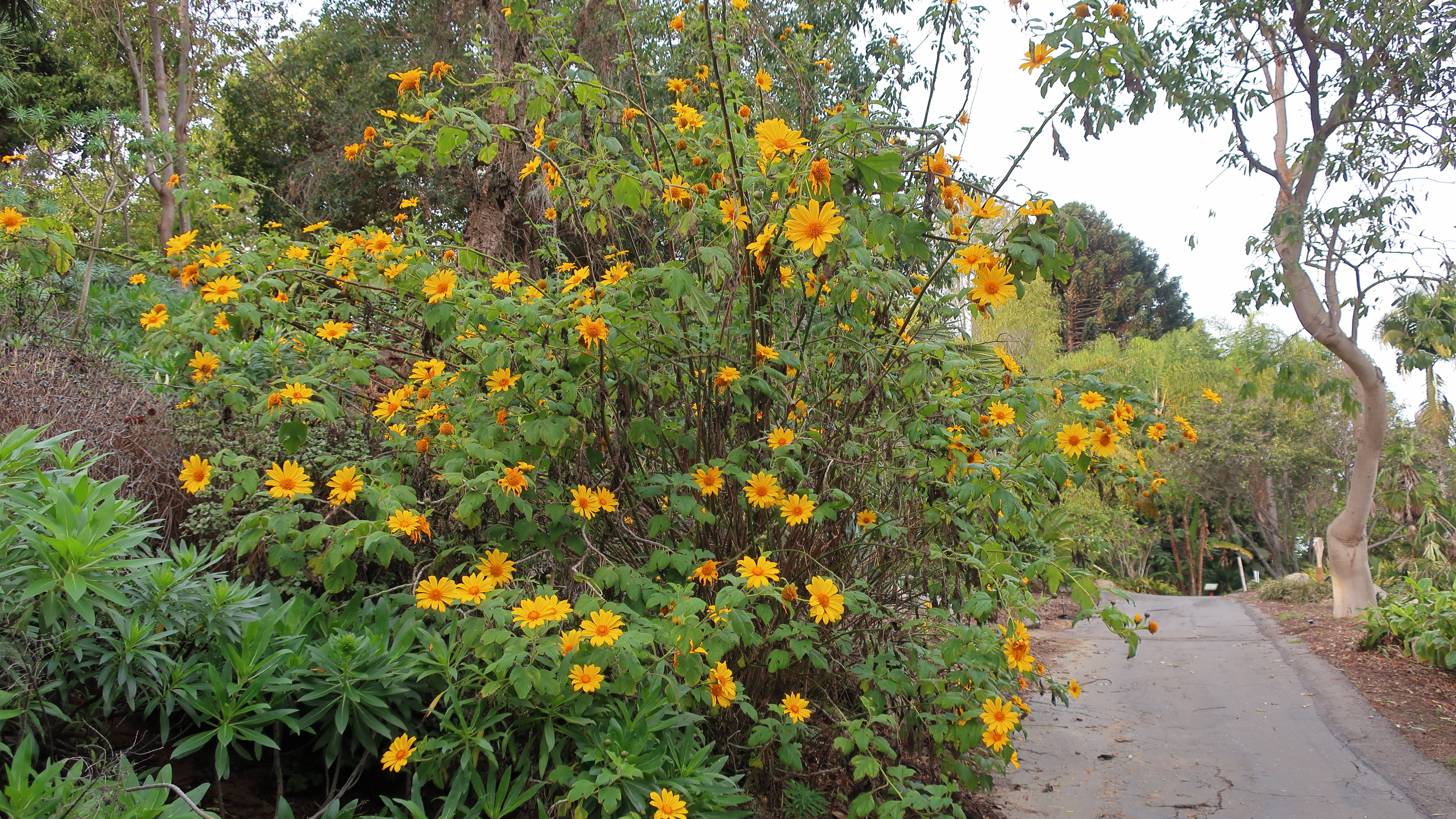
A shrub

Tithonia diversifolia can grow in many different environmental conditions. It has a moderate drought tolerance. It is ideally grown in areas with an annual rainfall ranging from 1000–2000 mm and a temperature of 15-31 degrees Celsius.

This plant does not require a large amount of nutrients. As a weed it spreads rapidly, which allows its use as a forage crop in grazing or cut-and-carry systems.

== Economics ==
A study on the use of this green fertilizer on tomato plants shows that this is a useful method to increase crop yields in order to benefit the farmer’s wealth. However, this is not without a serious look at the labour requirements. A different study found that, with maize, the overall labour demand versus the financial prospects is not worthwhile, especially in areas of unpredictable rainfalls.

This same study also found that growing T. diversifolia on farmer land is not as beneficial from an economic standpoint. Instead, it is better to harvest from an off site location and transport to the fields. From this study, fields that received only a P fertilizer yielded an income to the farmer of $50USD/ha. When only T. diversifolia was applied, this income rose to $494USD/ha. The latter results are high, as another study showed an increase of only to $116USD/ha.

Harvesting and distributing this fertilizer over the land by hand is very labour-intensive. The best yields come when T. diversifolia is grown off the land as to not take up growing space. For this reason, when time spent on labour has been factored, this approach may not be beneficial to a farmer.

== Biomass ==
Tithonia diversifolia can be used as organic fertilizer biomass. The biomass refers to materials that are derived from the plant, such as its foliage, being worked into the soil as a dry fertilizer. Since its use as fertilizer requires high labour, it is recommended for use with high value crops such as tomato, kale, carrot, and maize. For this use, the plant is first grown in hedges around the edges of harvest land. It is important though to keep the maximum amount of growing area a farmer has. The green stems (not the woody stems), leaves, and flowers can be removed from the plant at a farmer selected time, though it is recommended that cutting every 5 months will give a plentiful amount of nutrients in the biomass. The biomass can also be used as a mulch and can be left on top of the soil to decompose into the ground. It has been found that the biomass from T. diversifolia breaks down rapidly and releases nutrients quickly.

When applying the mulch or biomass to the soil, it should be applied at the minimum amount of one ton to every hectare of land. However, the best yield is given when 5 tons/hectare is applied. The downside here is that a lot of foliage is needed to cover a small area of land because it has a high water content. Mixing this biomass with a synthetic fertilizer will bring higher yields. A study found that when applying tithonia with triple superphosphate (TSP) that the yields increased by 220% compared to a control test containing only an inorganic nitrogen fertilizer (Urea). When using T. diversifolia it should be supplemented with a Mg fertilizer as this nutrient is lacking in quantity when compared to other green fertilizers.

== Symbolism and uses ==
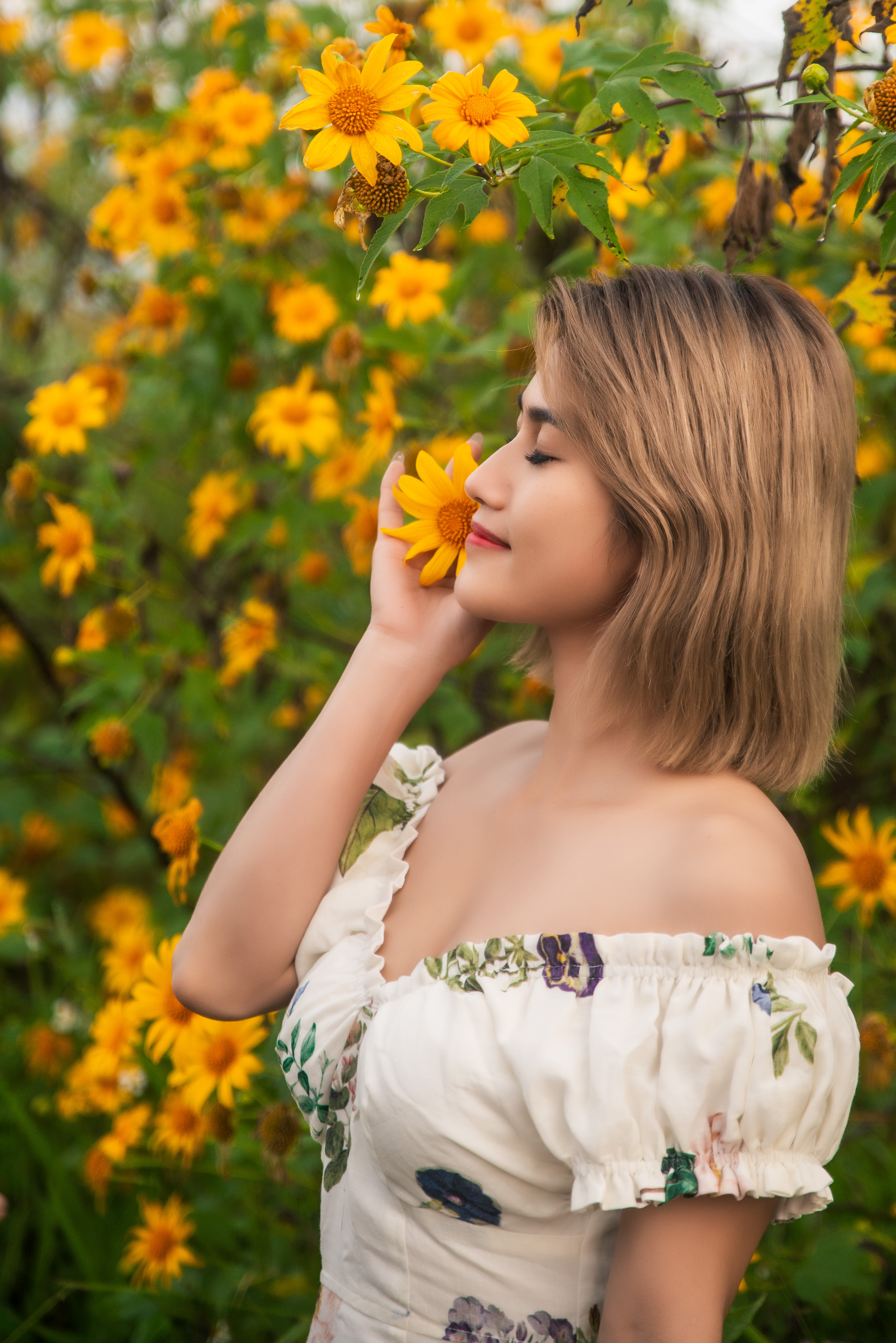
A girl with tree marigold flowers (Lâm Đồng, Việt Nam).

- In Japan, towards the end of the Meiji Period, they were imported as ornamental plants although seldom cultivated there. Having a characteristic bitter taste, they were used to induce a fever to help fight poisoning, although not used for direct medicinal purposes. There is also the story of the species being introduced to Japan by Nitobe Inazo, hence its Japanese name, the Nitobe chrysanthemum (ニトベギク; Nitobegiku).
- It is the official symbol of Da Lat city, Vietnam.
- They are sold in herbal medicine markets in Taiwan.
- It is the provincial flower of Mae Hong Son Province, Thailand.
- T. diversifolia may increase phosphorus utilization in soil when it is applied as a green manure.
- In East African sugarcane fields, their flowers are used to attract beneficial arthropods as a biocontrol strategy.
