= Death Valley expedition =

1891 expedition

The Death Valley expedition was an 1891 expedition to discover the geographic distributions of plants (phytogeography) and animals in California's Death Valley.

It was the first of a series of expeditions funded by an 1890 act of the United States Congress. The expedition included biologists, naturalists, botanists, and zoologists.

It was one of the first in a series of biological surveys of the West made by naturalist Clinton Hart Merriam, who studied the geographical distribution of plants and animals in order to define life zones that could be used to assess the suitability of land for farming and ranching. Merriam was particularly interested in the Death Valley Country, not for its dubious agricultural potential or for "deadly peculiarities," but for the possibility of finding strange new species of life and for the unique opportunity to study seven separate life zones in the short span from the valley floor to the Panamints. For the expedition Merriam recruited government zoologists Vernon Bailey, Basil H. Dutcher, and Edward W. Nelson; ornithologists Albert K. Fisher and Theodore S. Palmer; entomologist Albert Koebele; botanists Frederick V. Coville and Frederick Funston; and an amateur naturalist, Frank Stephens, who later founded the San Diego Natural History Museum. ... Palmer ... headed the expedition for the first three months before Merriam could join them.

This expedition was placed in charge of Dr. T. S. Palmer, since Merriam himself, after starting with the party, had been invited by President Harrison to act as a Bering Sea Commissioner to study the fur seals and spent the summer on the Pribilof Islands in Alaska.

They produced valuable reports of historic significance in several fields, including "Botany of the Death Valley Expedition", “The Death Valley Expedition: A Biological Survey of Parts of California, Nevada, Arizona, and Utah”, and "Annotated List of the Reptiles and Batrachians Collected by the Death Valley Expedition in 1891, with Descriptions of New Species".
