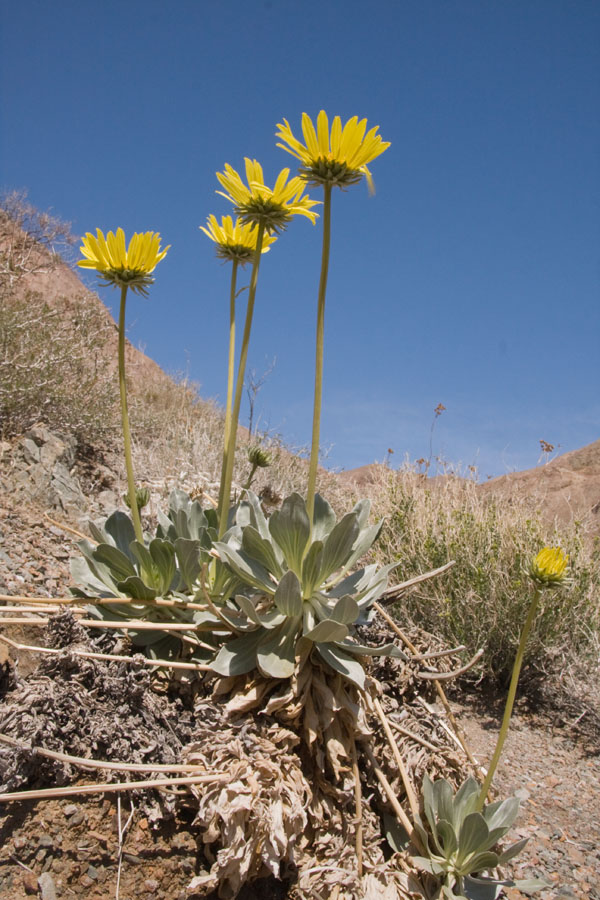

Conservation status
- Imperiled (NatureServe)

Scientific classification
- Kingdom: Plantae
- Clade: Tracheophytes
- Clade: Angiosperms
- Clade: Eudicots
- Clade: Asterids
- Order: Asterales
- Family: Asteraceae
- Tribe: Heliantheae
- Genus: Enceliopsis
- Species: E. covillei

Binomial name
- Enceliopsis covillei (A. Nelson) S.F.Blake 1931

Synonyms
- Encelia grandiflora M.E.Jones 1895 not (Benth.) Hemsl. 1881; Helianthella covillei A.Nelson 1904

= Enceliopsis covillei =

Species of flowering plant

Enceliopsis covillei, known by the common name Panamint daisy, is a rare North American desert species of flowering plant in the family Asteraceae.

== Distribution ==
The perennial plant is endemic to California, within Death Valley National Park in Inyo County. It is only known from the rocky slopes of the western Panamint Range sky island, west of Death Valley in the northern Mojave Desert.

The species was named for American botanist Frederick Vernon Coville (1867–1937), by American botanist Aven Nelson as Helianthella covillei.

== Description ==
Enceliopsis covillei is a perennial herb with erect stems varying in height from 15 to 100 cm (6-40 inches), growing from a tough, woody caudex. The silvery woolly leaves are up to 10 centimeters (4 inches) long by 8 wide and are spade-shaped to oval to diamond-shaped with winged petioles.

The inflorescence is a large solitary flower head on an erect or leaning peduncle which may reach 100 cm (40 inches) tall. The flower head has a base made up of three layers of pointed phyllaries coated in gray or silvery hairs. The head has a fringe of many yellow ray florets each up to 5 centimeters (2 inches) long, surrounding many small disc florets of the same color.

The fruit is an achene about a centimeter long with a small pappus.

== Conservation ==
An artwork of the Panamint daisy is featured in the logo of the California Native Plant Society, a renowned botanical, conservation, and education organization in California established in 1965.

Enceliopsis covillei is an endangered species on the California Native Plant Society Inventory of Rare and Endangered Plants.
