= Theodore Sherman Palmer =

American zoologist (1868–1955)

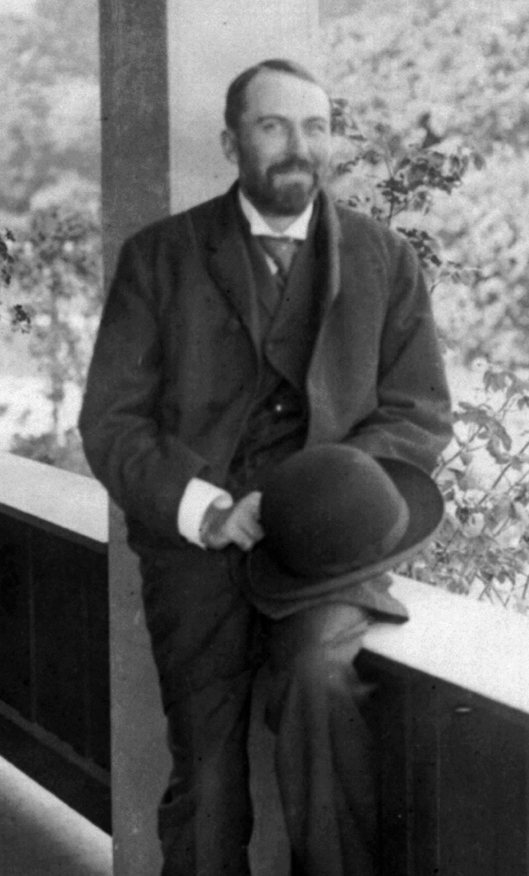
Theodore Sherman Palmer.

Theodore Sherman Palmer (January 26, 1868 – July 24, 1955) was an American zoologist.

Palmer was born in Oakland, California, and studied at the University of California. He was the son of Henry Austin and Jane Olivia (Day) Palmer, and his mother was the daughter of Sherman Day, granddaughter of Yale President Jeremiah Day, and the great-granddaughter of American founding father Roger Sherman, meaning that Palmer was Sherman's great-great grandson.

In 1889, he joined the Division of Economic Ornithology and Mammalogy of the United States Department of Agriculture under Clinton Hart Merriam. In 1891 he was a member of the 1891 Death Valley Expedition and its leader for its first 3 months. He was Assistant Chief of the Department from 1896 to 1902, and then from 1910 to 1914. He became interested in the legislation affecting wildlife, leading a branch of the organization to deal with it from 1902 to 1910 and from 1914 to 1916. He wrote the preliminary draft of the treaty for protection of birds migrating between Canada and the United States (1916), and was Chairman of the Committee which prepared the first regulations under the Migratory Bird Treaty Act (1918). He retired in 1933.

Palmer was a member of about 25 North American and 4 foreign scientific or conservation organizations. He was vice-president of the American Society of Mammalogists from 1928 to 1934, and a co-founder of the National Audubon Society.

Palmer is commemorated in the scientific names of two North American lizards: Uta palmeri and Elgaria coerulea palmeri. He is also commemorated in the name of a chipmunk: Neotamias palmeri.

== See also ==
- Death Valley Expedition
