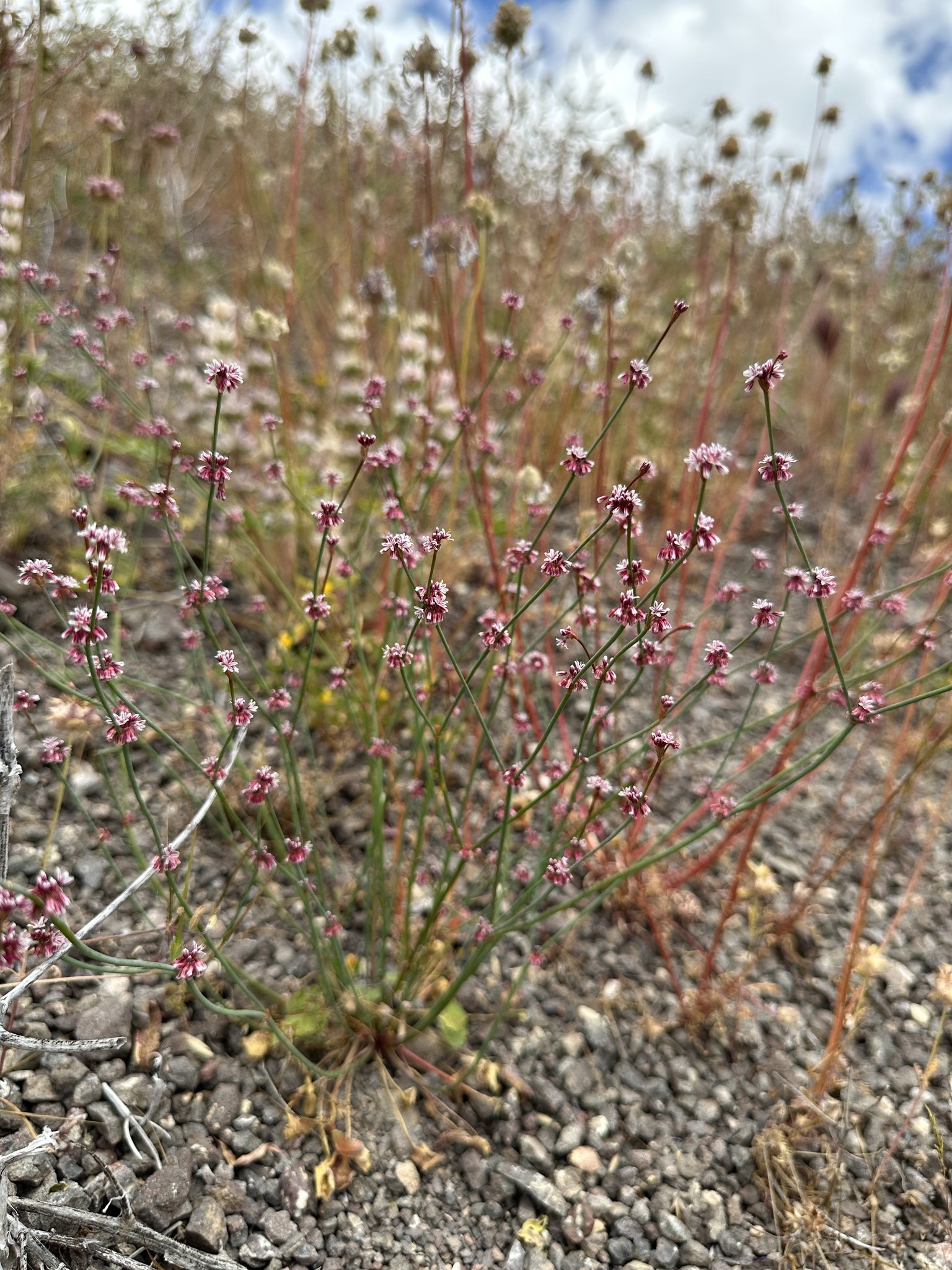

Conservation status
- Vulnerable (NatureServe)

Scientific classification
- Kingdom: Plantae
- Clade: Tracheophytes
- Clade: Angiosperms
- Clade: Eudicots
- Order: Caryophyllales
- Family: Polygonaceae
- Genus: Eriogonum
- Species: E. covilleanum

Binomial name
- Eriogonum covilleanum Eastw.

= Eriogonum covilleanum =

Species of wild buckwheat

Eriogonum covilleanum is a species of wild buckwheat known by the common name Coville's buckwheat. It is endemic to California, where it grows in the Coast Ranges from the Bay Area to the hills north of the Los Angeles area. It is uncommon in general but it can be locally common in some places. An upright, reddish-tinged green blooming stem up to around 40 centimeters high is produced by this perennial plant. The leaves are under 2 centimeters long, rounded to oblong in shape, and woolly in texture, especially on the undersides. The many scattered inflorescences are small, compact clusters of tiny flowers in shades of yellow or pinkish to white.

== Taxonomy ==
In 1931 the botanist Alice Eastwood described a new species in the Eriogonum genus which she named Eriogonum covilleanum. The species is classified alongside the rest of its genus in the Polygonaceae family and has no subspecies or synonyms.
