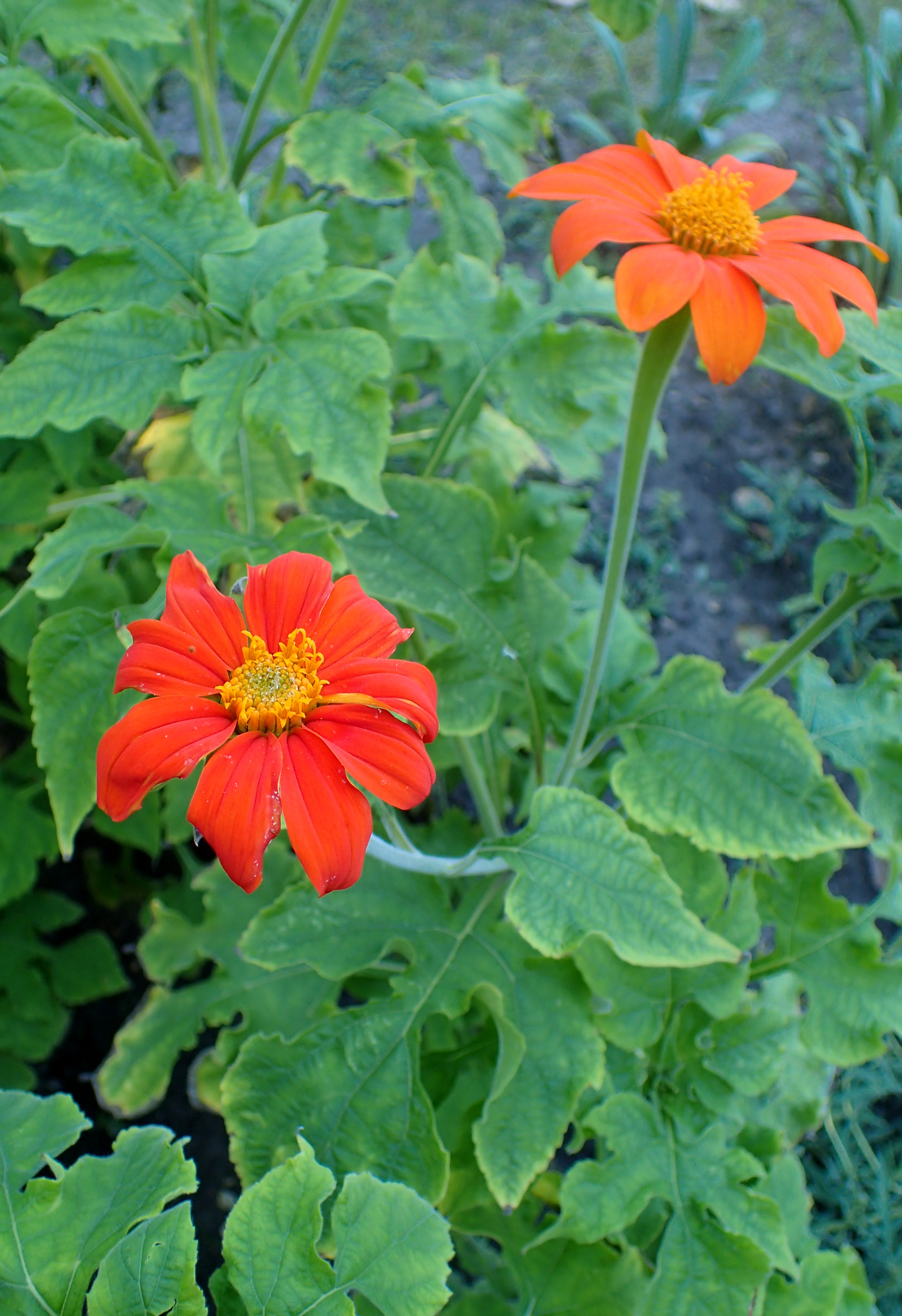

Scientific classification
- Kingdom: Plantae
- Clade: Tracheophytes
- Clade: Angiosperms
- Clade: Eudicots
- Clade: Asterids
- Order: Asterales
- Family: Asteraceae
- Tribe: Heliantheae
- Genus: Tithonia
- Species: T. rotundifolia

Binomial name
- Tithonia rotundifolia (Mill.) S.F. Blake

= Tithonia rotundifolia =

Species of flowering plant

Tithonia rotundifolia, the red sunflower or Mexican sunflower, is a plant in the family Asteraceae whose native range is Mexico to Central America and which grows primarily in the seasonally dry tropical biome.

== Description ==
Plants are perennial in the native habitat, up to 4 m tall with orange or red flowers (in cultivation only 0.8 to 1.5 meters). In USDA zones cooler than Zone 10 it is an annual. Leaves, despite the epithet, are deltoid to lanceolate, occasionally lobed (or broadly heart-shaped) up to 38 cm long and 30 cm wide, with subentire, crenate or serrated margin. The lower ones are usually three-lobed. The petiole is up to 40 centimeters long. The upper side of the leaves is gray, the underside is hairy.

=== Inflorescence ===
The flower heads have a diameter of 5 to 8 (rarely up to 10) centimeters. The ray flowers are vermilion red and broadly egg-shaped. The disc flowers are golden yellow and are generally solitary, long-pedunculated head, with a campanulate to hemispherical involucrum. There are 12 to 16 bracts, the outer ones being pointed. The fruit is a turbinado-quadrangular cypsel less than 1 cm long, brown or black, with two unequal deciduous wings. Migrating monarch butterflies, hummingbirds, and other pollinators use the flowers as a nectar source.

== Range ==
It occurs in Colorado, Florida, Louisiana, Mexico, Central America, Thailand, and the West Indies on fields, in woody plants and ruderally at altitudes below 1000 meters on the edges of roads and highways, as well as in other disturbed areas. Outside its native region it is sometimes grown as an ornamental and has become naturalized in some of these locales. In Africa it has been recorded up to an altitude of 1,580 m above sea level.

== Cultivation ==
Due to its characteristics, it is usually used in hedges to form a background for other smaller plants. It requires poor to average, well-drained soil in an area protected from the wind to prevent its brittle stems from bending or breaking. It is propagated from seeds. Seedlings are planted 30–50 centimeters apart. It requires a sunny plant site and fresh, nutrient-rich soil with plenty of humus. It tolerates drought well, but it still needs water during long periods of drought. The plant produces flowers from mid-summer until frost.

== Gallery ==
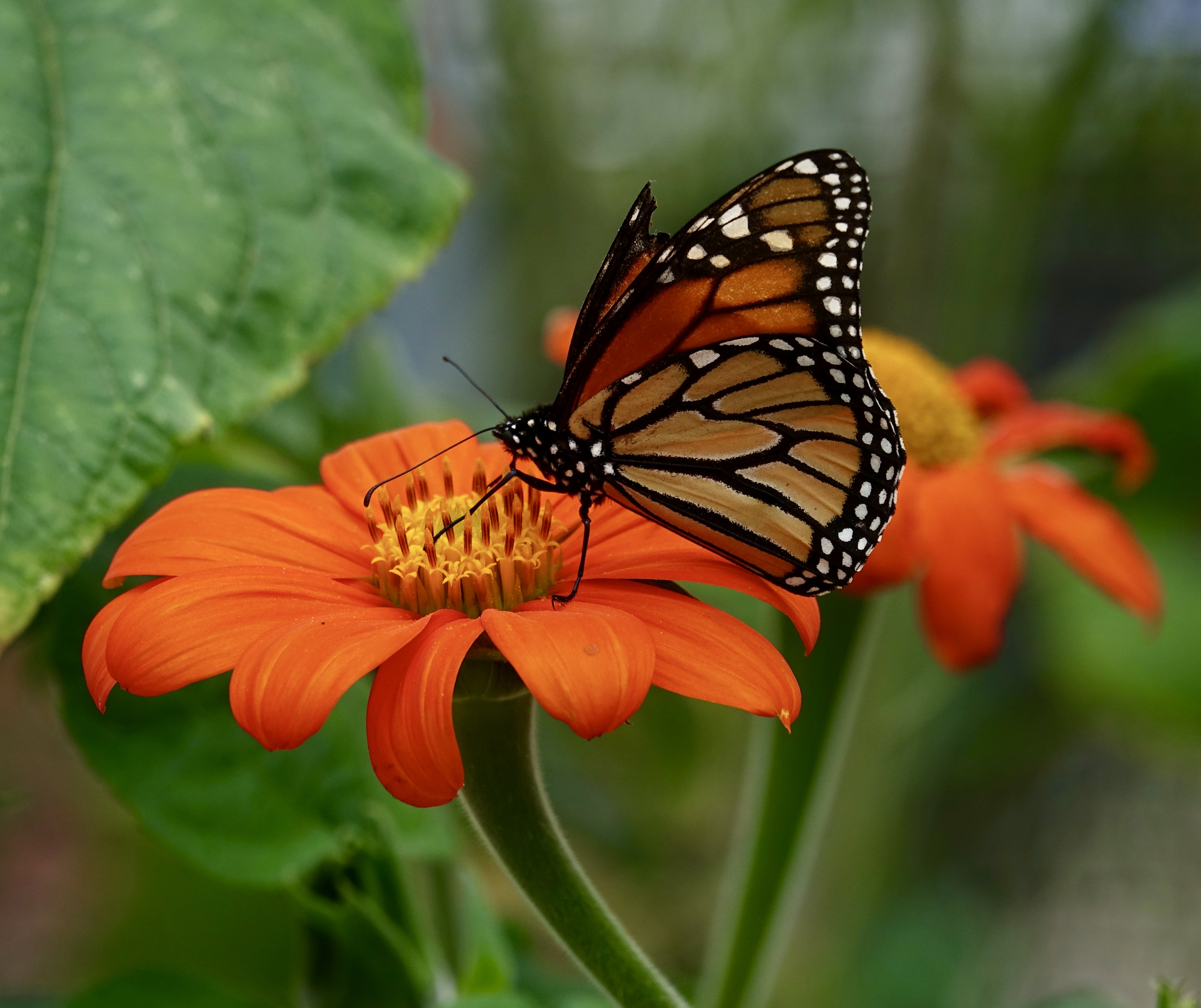
Monarch butterfly nectaring on a Mexican sunflower

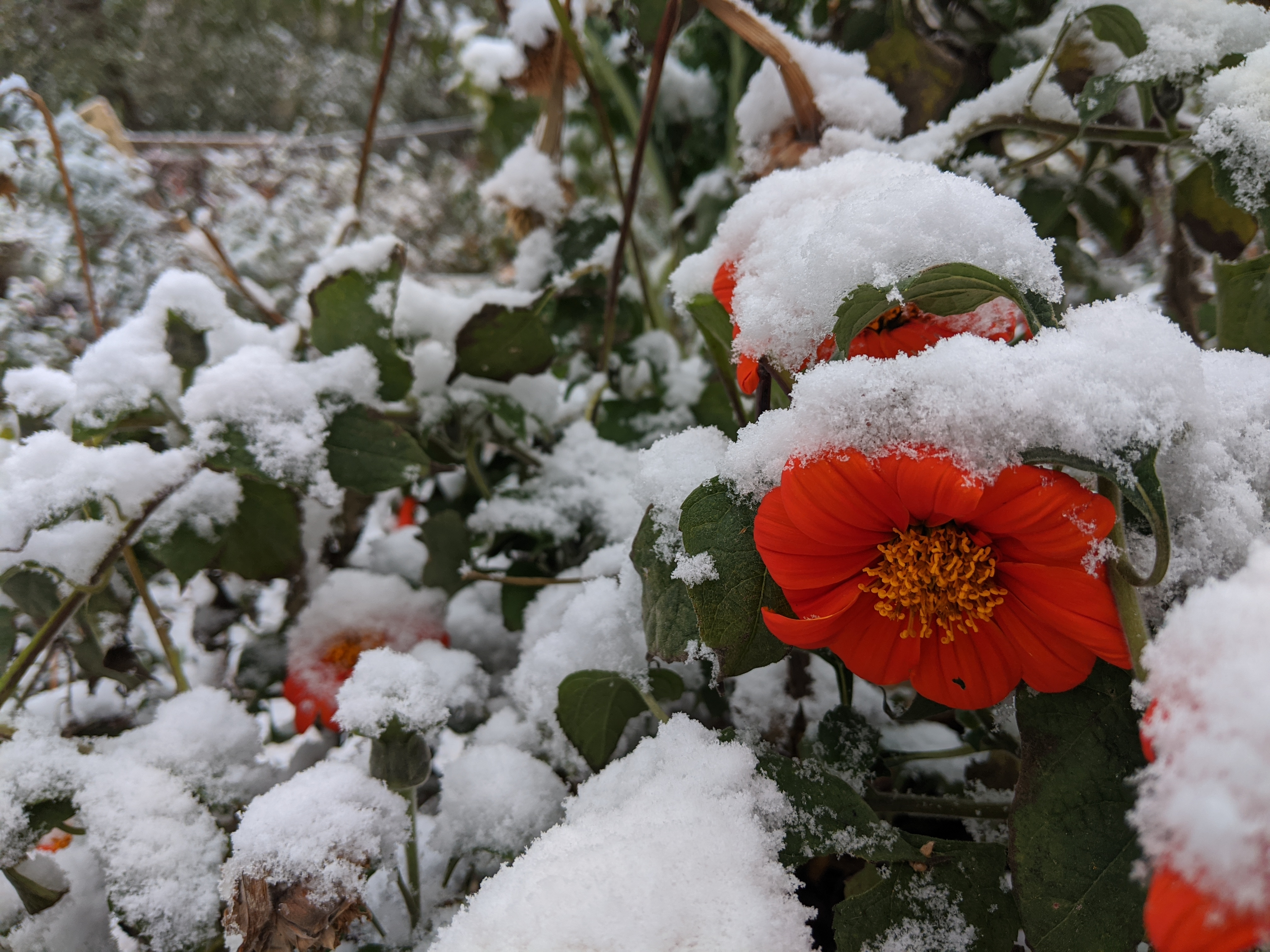
The plant covered in the first snow of fall in zone 5a

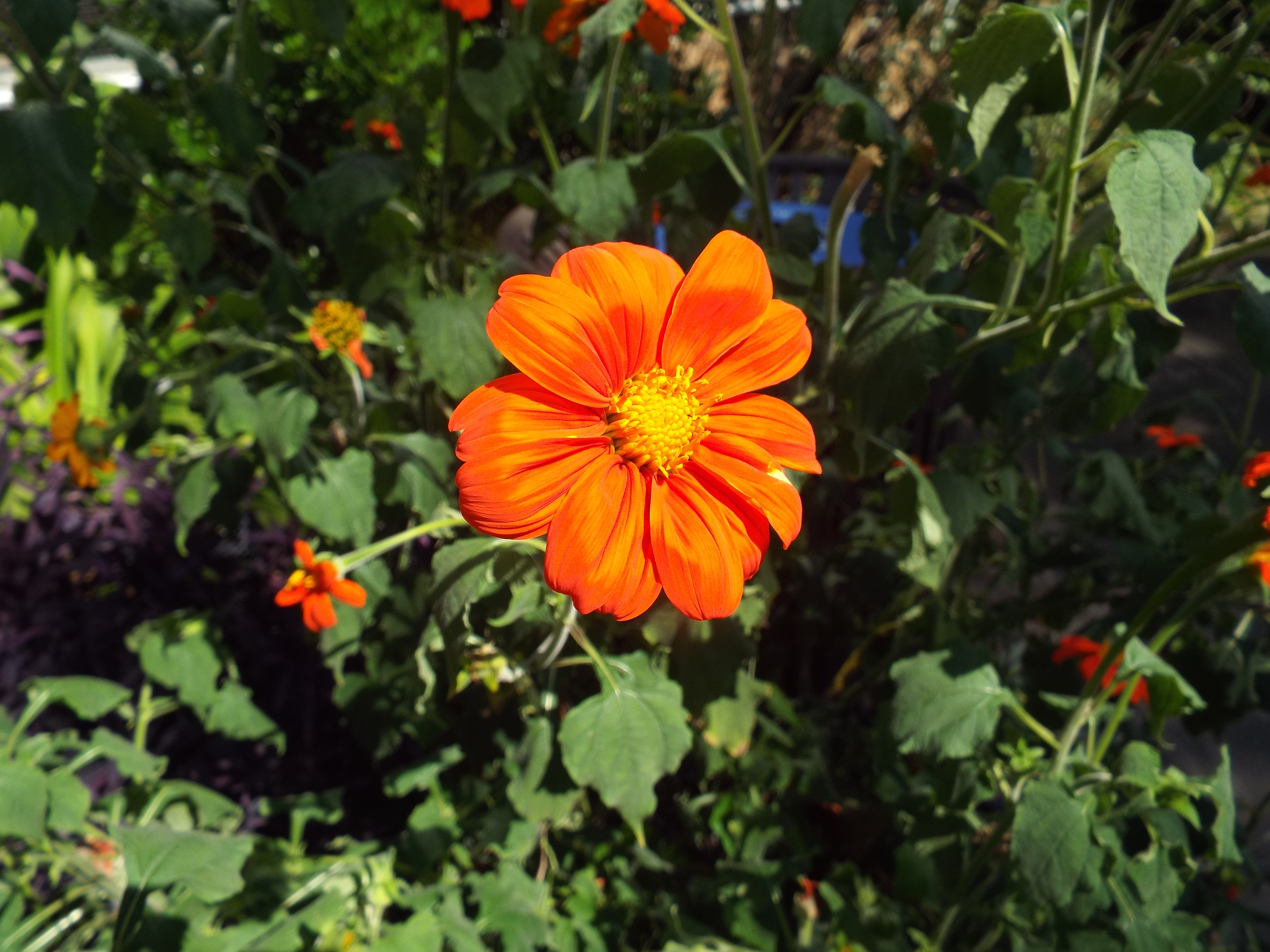

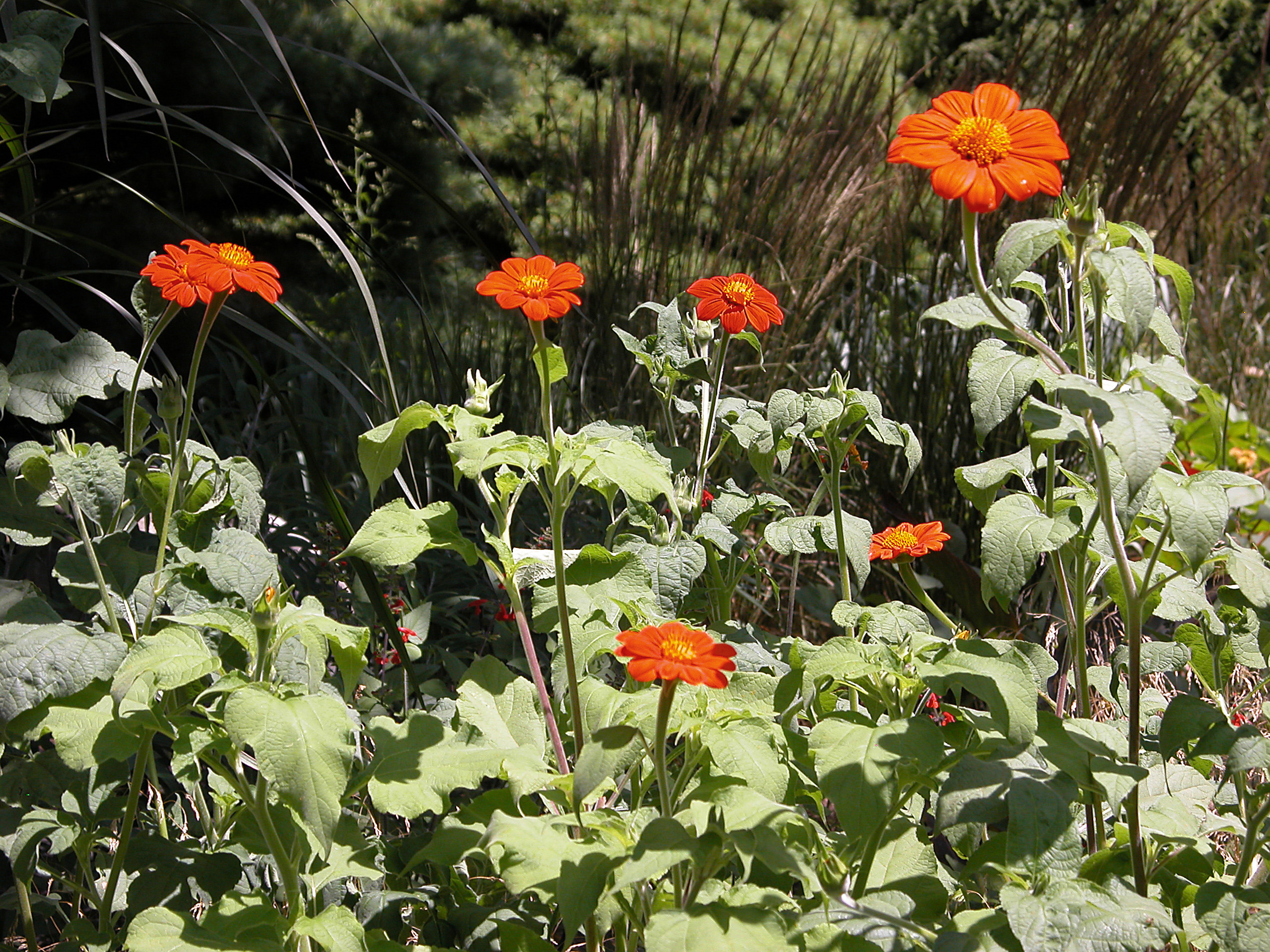

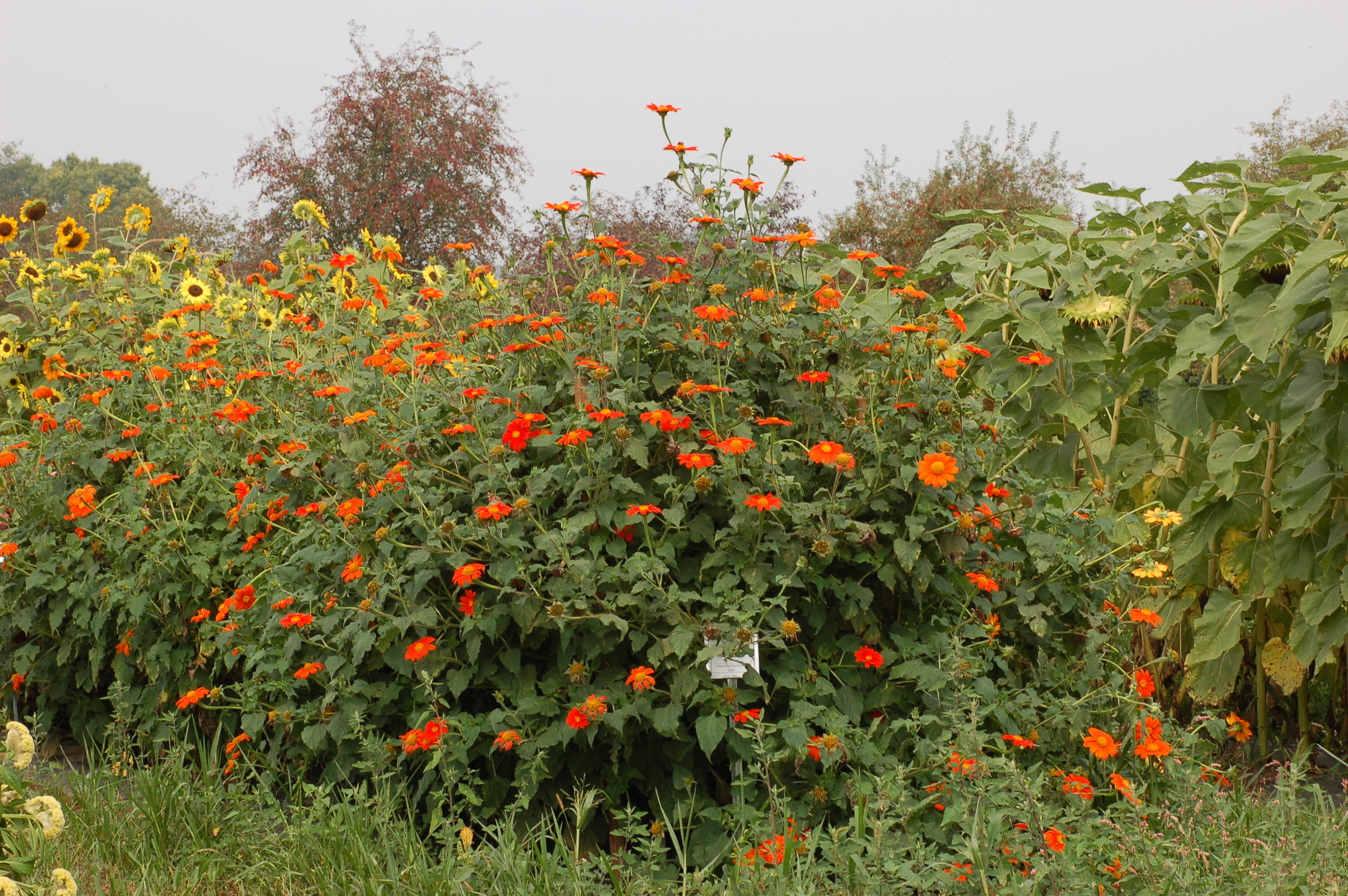

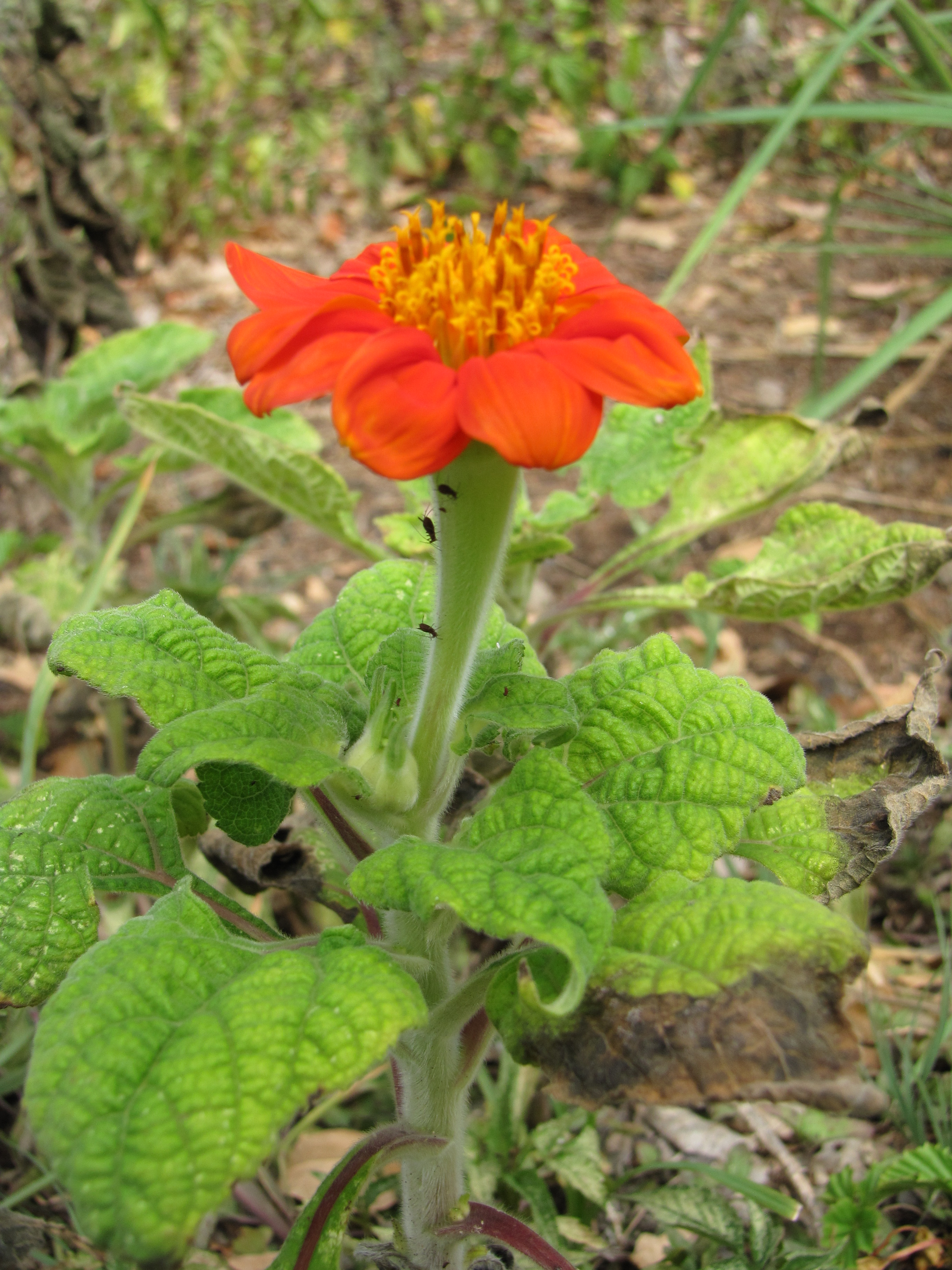

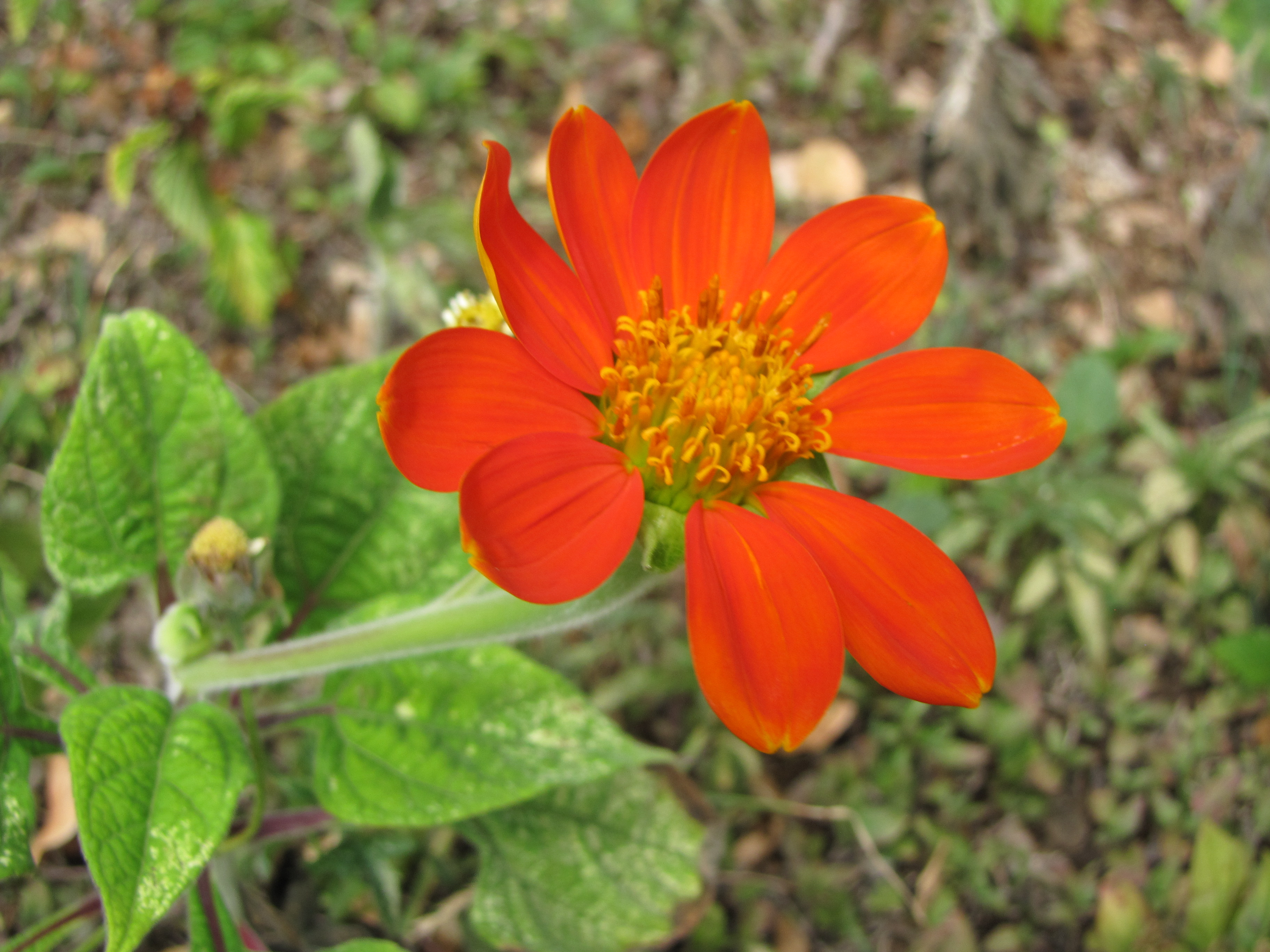

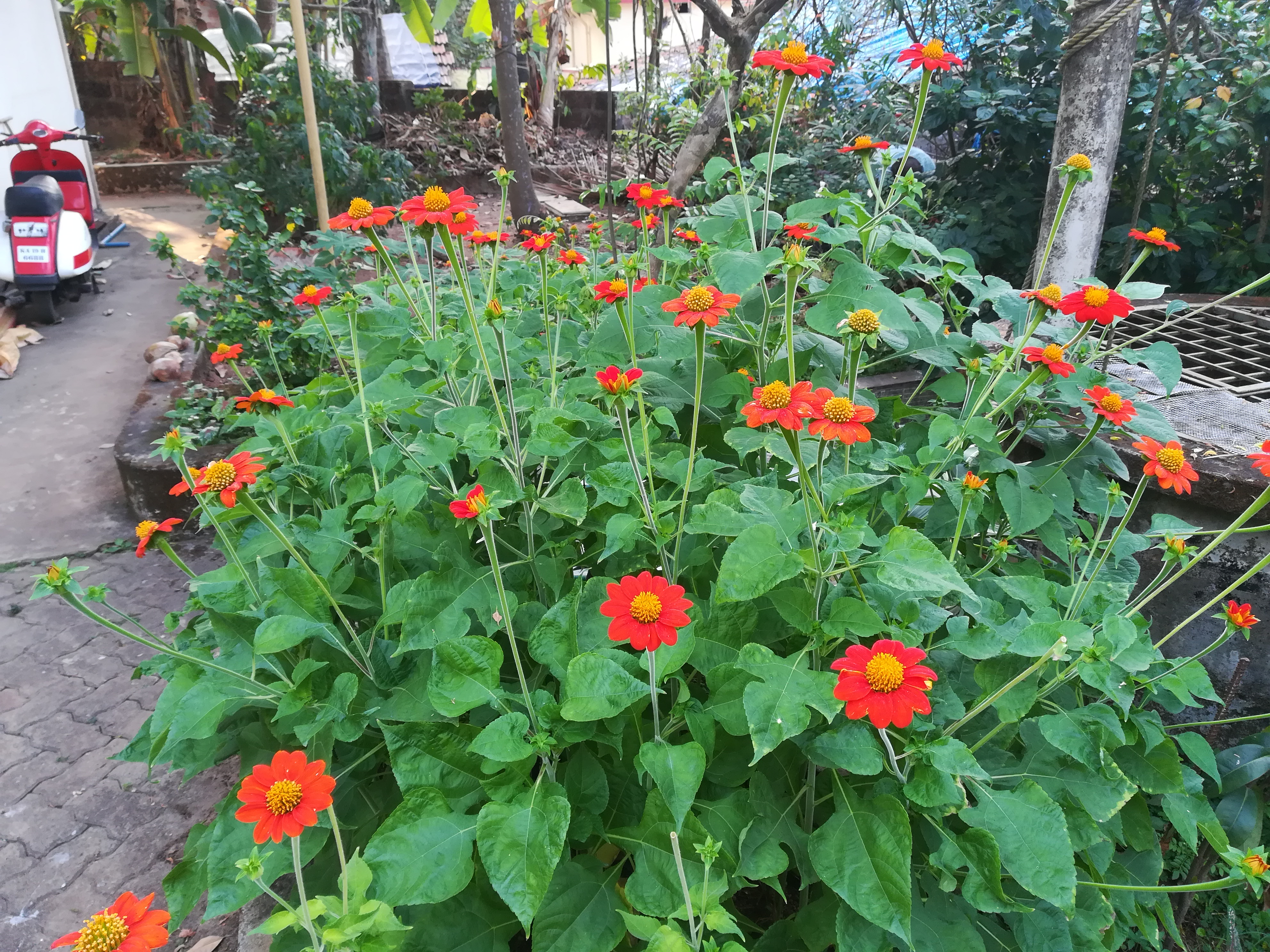

Common eastern bumblebee (Bombus impatiens) visiting Tithonia x 'Torch'

== Synonyms ==
- Tithonia rotundifolia (Mill.) S.F. Blake, Contr. Gray Herb. 52: 41. 1917.
  - Tagetes rotundifolia Miller, Gard. Dict. ed. 8, Tagetes no. 4. 1768.
  - Helianthus speciosus Hook., Bot. Mag. 61: t. 3295. 1834.
  - Tithonia speciosa (Hook.) Griseb., Cat. pl. Cub. 155. 1866.
  - Tithonia vilmoriniana Pamp.
