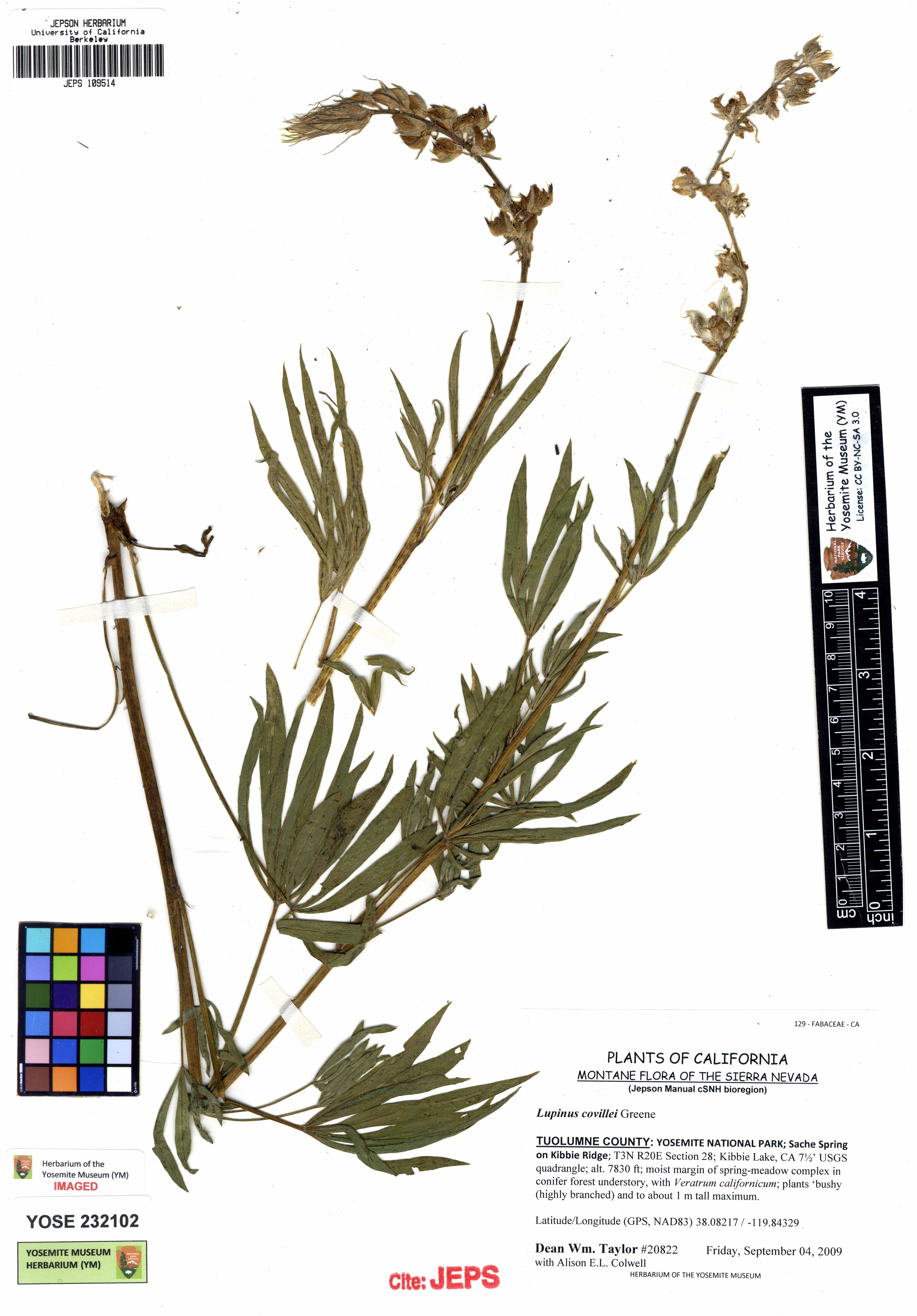

Scientific classification
- Kingdom: Plantae
- Clade: Tracheophytes
- Clade: Angiosperms
- Clade: Eudicots
- Clade: Rosids
- Order: Fabales
- Family: Fabaceae
- Subfamily: Faboideae
- Genus: Lupinus
- Species: L. covillei

Binomial name
- Lupinus covillei Greene

= Lupinus covillei =

Species of legume

Lupinus covillei is a species of lupine known by the common name shaggy lupine.

== Description ==
Lupinus covillei is an erect perennial herb growing up to 90 centimetres (35 in) tall. The shaggy-haired palmate leaves are made up of several leaflets each up to 10 centimetres (3.9 in) long. The herbage is coated in long, shaggy hairs. The inflorescence is a raceme of many flowers, sometimes arranged in whorls. Each flower is about a centimeter long and blue in color with a yellowish spot on the banner. The fruit is a woolly legume pod up to 4 centimetres (1.6 in) long.

== Distribution ==
Lupinus covillei is endemic to the Sierra Nevada of California, where it grows in moist habitat such as wet depressions in meadows. In the same state it is also abundant in Sequoia, Yosemite and Kings Canyon National Parks.
