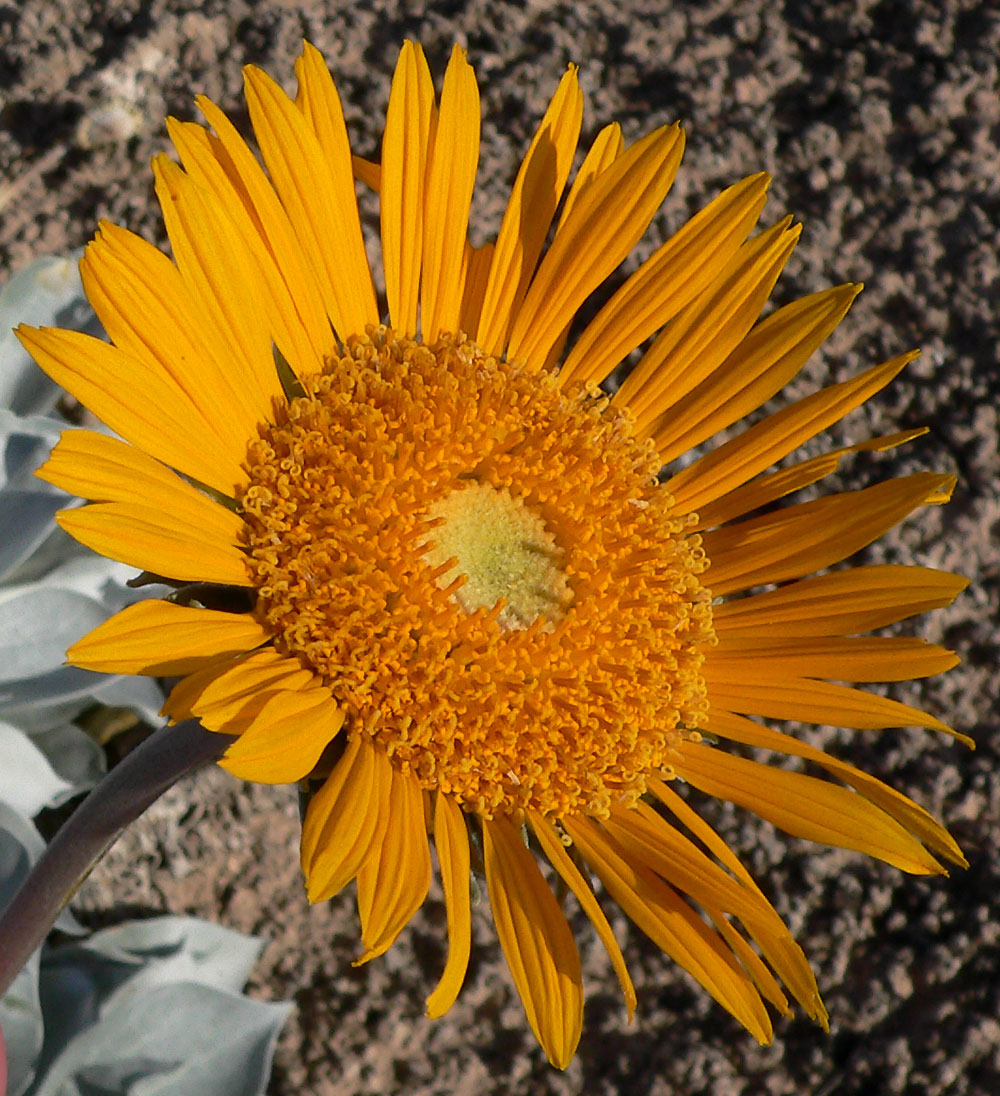
- In Lake Mead National Recreation Area, Nevada

Scientific classification
- Kingdom: Plantae
- Clade: Tracheophytes
- Clade: Angiosperms
- Clade: Eudicots
- Clade: Asterids
- Order: Asterales
- Family: Asteraceae
- Tribe: Heliantheae
- Genus: Enceliopsis
- Species: E. argophylla

Binomial name
- Enceliopsis argophylla (D.C.Eaton) A.Nelson

Synonyms
- Encelia argophylla (D.C.Eaton) A.Gray; Helianthella argophylla (D.C.Eaton) A.Gray; Tithonia argophylla D.C.Eaton

= Enceliopsis argophylla =

Species of flowering plant

Enceliopsis argophylla, commonly known as the silverleaf sunray, is a North American species of flowering plant in the family Asteraceae. Other common names include nakedstem sunray and naked-stemmed daisy. It is native to the southwestern United States: Arizona (Mohave County), Nevada (Clark County), and Utah (Washington County), and can be seen a short distance east of Las Vegas, Nevada.

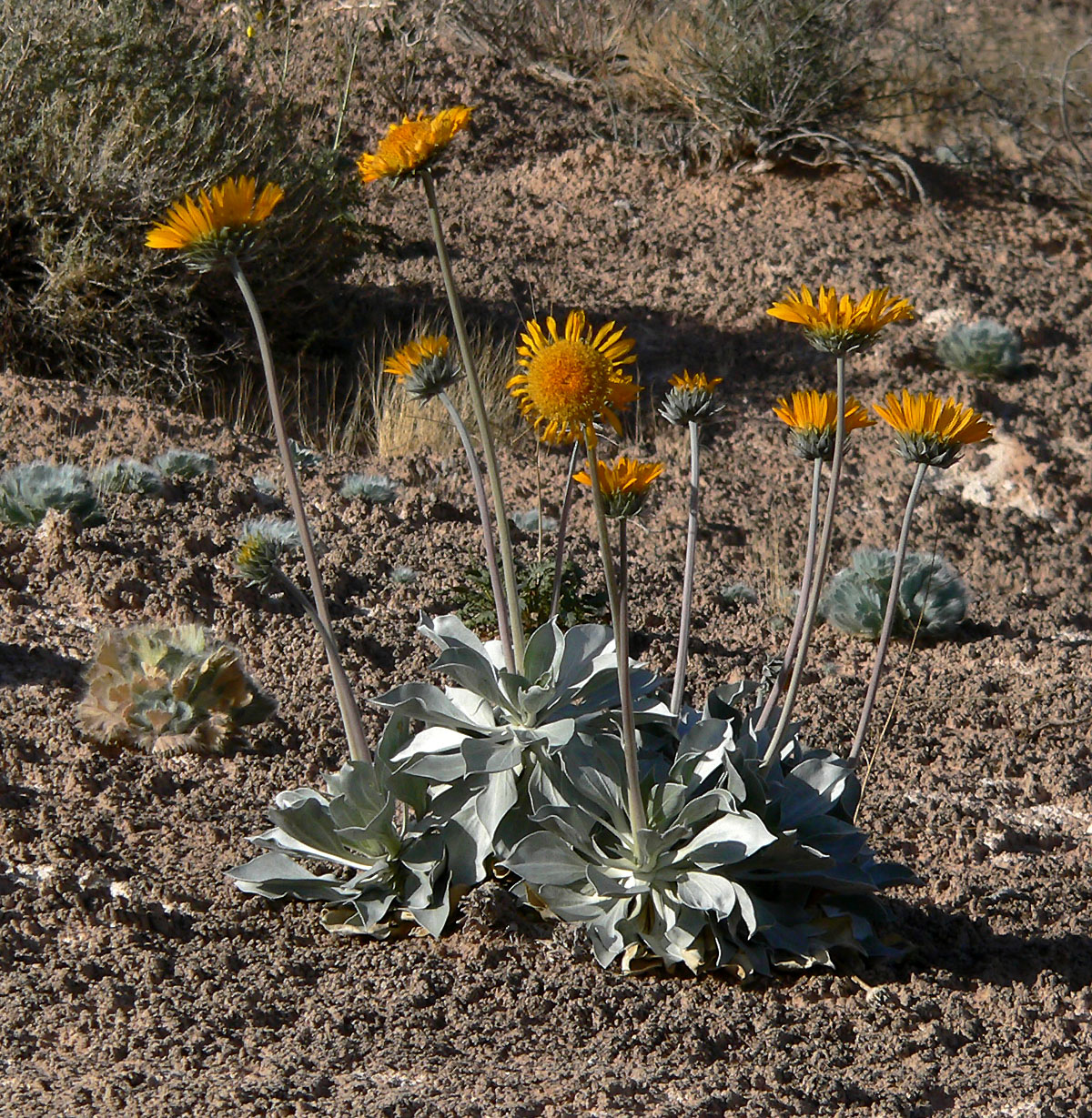
Habit, Lake Mead National Recreation Area

== Description ==
Enceliopsis argophylla is a perennial herb up to 80 cm (2.6 ft) tall, appearing silvery because of many small hairs pressed against the leaves. Leaf blades are up to 10 cm (3.9 in) long, with wings running along the sides of the petioles. Appearing in April and May, the flower heads are yellow, at the ends of long peduncles, each head with as many as 35 ray florets and up to 500 tiny disc florets. The achene is strongly flattened, covered with small hairs, and sometimes with a pappus of 2 awns up to 2 mm long (unlike some of the related species).

American botanist Daniel Cady Eaton described the silverleaf sunray as Tithonia argophylla in 1871.

== Distribution and habitat ==
Found in Clark and Mohave Counties in the vicinity of the artificial reservoir Lake Mead, it grows on stony barren slopes at 1,000 to 1,500 m (3,300 to 4,900 ft) altitude. It often grows alongside the rare golden bear-claw poppy or Las Vegas bear-poppy Arctomecon californica. Both plants grow in a fragile gypsum crust on the soil, which when damaged facilitates the spread of invasive plants. Its habitat is threatened by the reservoir as well as off-road recreational vehicle use.
