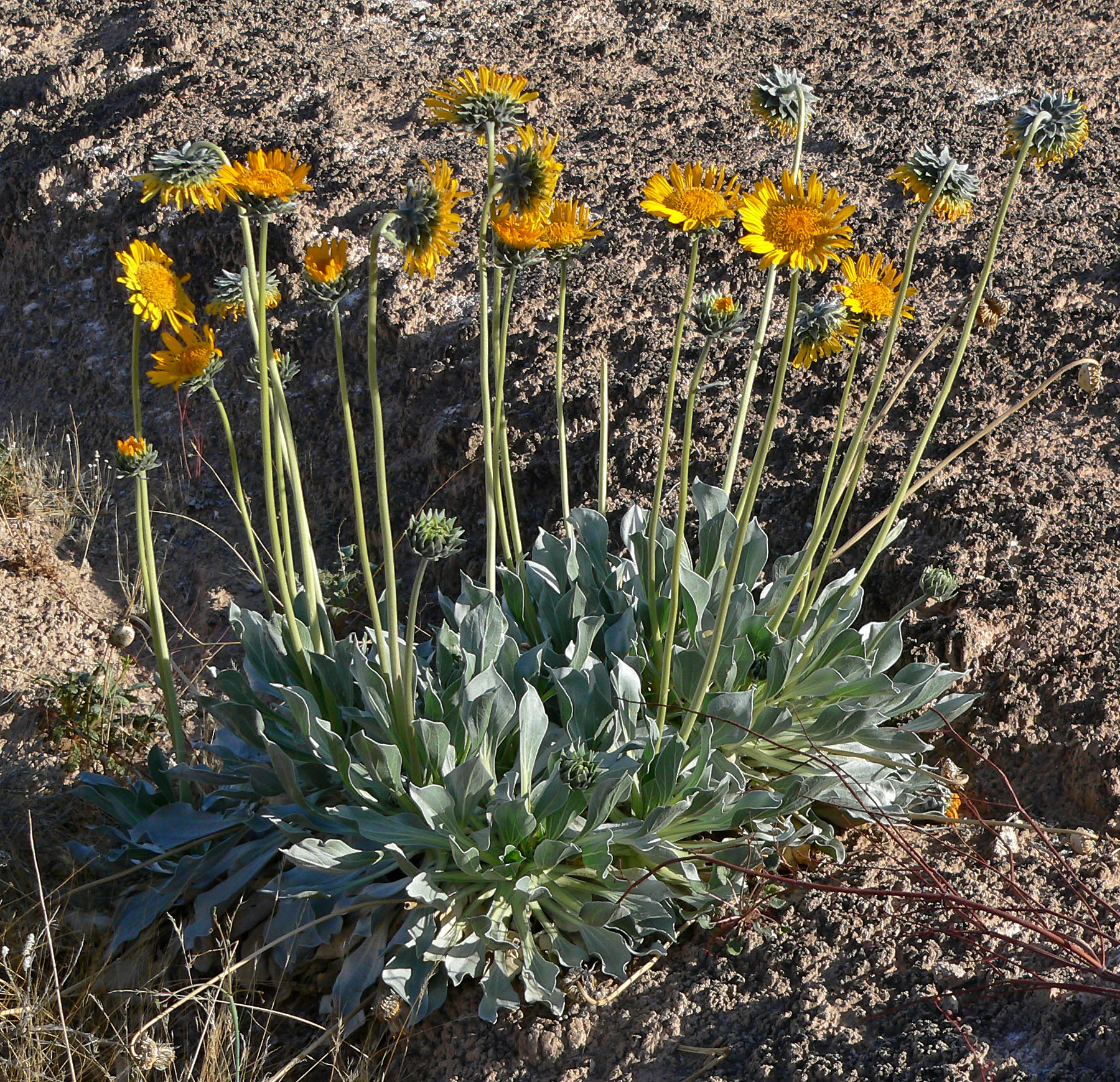
- Enceliopsis argophylla

Scientific classification
- Kingdom: Plantae
- Clade: Tracheophytes
- Clade: Angiosperms
- Clade: Eudicots
- Clade: Asterids
- Order: Asterales
- Family: Asteraceae
- Subfamily: Asteroideae
- Tribe: Heliantheae
- Subtribe: Enceliinae
- Genus: Enceliopsis (A. Gray) A. Nelson, 1909

Synonyms
- Helianthella section Enceliopsis A. Gray

= Enceliopsis =

Genus of flowering plants

Enceliopsis is a small genus of flowering plants in the family Asteraceae. They are sometimes called sunrays. They are similar to the daisylike plants in the related genus Encelia. These three shrubs are native to the western United States and Canada.

Species

- Enceliopsis argophylla - silverleaf sunray - Arizona (Mohave Co), Nevada (Clark Co), Utah (Washington Co)
- Enceliopsis covillei - Panamint daisy - Inyo County in California
- Enceliopsis nudicaulis - nakedstem sunray - California, Arizona, Nevada, Utah, Colorado, Idaho
