= Juncus sect. Tenageia =

Scientific classification
- Kingdom: Plantae
- Clade: Embryophytes
- Clade: Tracheophytes
- Clade: Spermatophytes
- Clade: Angiosperms
- Clade: Monocots
- Clade: Commelinids
- Order: Poales
- Family: Juncaceae
- Genus: Juncus
- Subgenus: Juncus subg. Poiophylli
- Section: Juncus sect. Tenageia; Dumort.

Section of flowering plants in the rush family

Juncus sect. Tenageia is a section of small annual rushes.

== Species ==
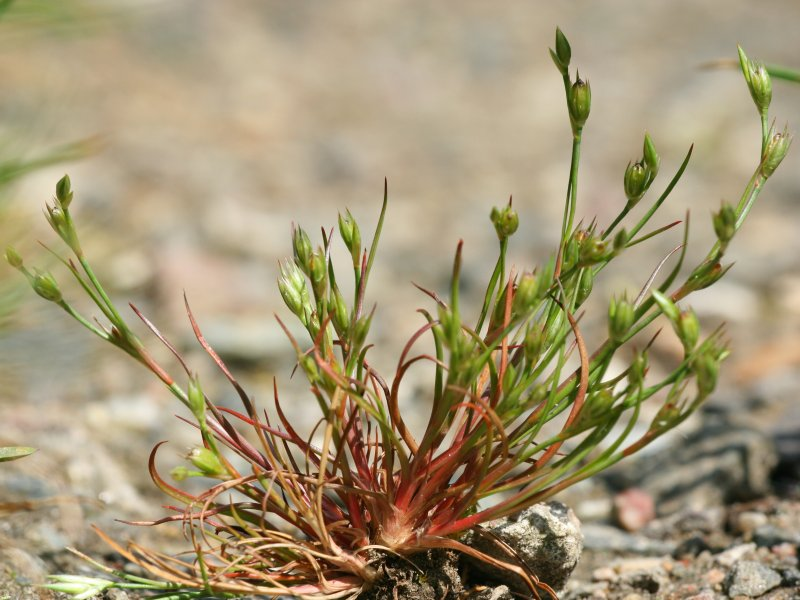
Juncus bufonius

- Juncus amuricus (Maxim.) V.I.Krecz. & Gontsch.
- Juncus bufonius L.
- Juncus foliosus Desf.
- Juncus hybridus Brot.
- Juncus maroccanus Kirschner
- Juncus minutulus (Albert & Jahand.) Prain
- Juncus ranarius Songeon & E.P.Perrier
- Juncus rechingeri Snogerup
- Juncus sorrentinoi Parl.
- Juncus sphaerocarpus Nees
- Juncus tenageia Ehrh. ex L.f.
- --- Juncus tenageia subsp. tenageia Ehrh. ex L.f.
- --- Juncus tenageia subsp. perpusillus Fern.-Carv. & F.Navarro
- Juncus turkestanicus V.I.Krecz. & Gontsch.

=== Selected Synonyms ===
- Juncus ambiguus T.A.Cope & C.A.Stace Juncus ranarius
