= Meckel =

Meckel may refer to:

== People ==
=== German anatomist/physician family Meckel ===
- Johann Friedrich Meckel, the Younger (1781–1833), German anatomist
- Johann Friedrich Meckel, the Elder (1724–1774) German anatomist, grandfather of the Younger
- Philipp Friedrich Theodor Meckel (1755–1803) German anatomist, father of Johann Friedrich the Younger
- August Albrecht Meckel (1789–1829) German physician. brother of Johann Friedrich the Younger
- Johann Heinrich Meckel (1821–1856) German anatomist, son of Johann Friedrich the Younger

=== Others ===
- Christoph Meckel (1935–2020) German poet, writer, and graphic artist
- Jakob Meckel (1842–1905) Prussian general
- Markus Meckel (born 1952) German theologian and politician
- Miriam Meckel (born 1967) German journalist and academic

== Places ==
- Meckel, Germany
