= Juncus gracilis =

Juncus gracilis is a taxon synonym for several accepted species of plants:

- Juncus gracilis Roth, synonym of Juncinella capitata
- Juncus gracilis R.Br., nom illeg., synonym of Juncus meianthus
- Juncus gracilis (Hook.f.) Walp., nom. illeg.homonym., synonym of Juncus hookeridis
- Juncus gracilis Lej., nom. illeg. homonym. post., synonym of Juncus tenageia subsp. tenageia
- Juncus gracilis Sm., nom. illeg. homonym. post., synonym of Juncus tenuis
