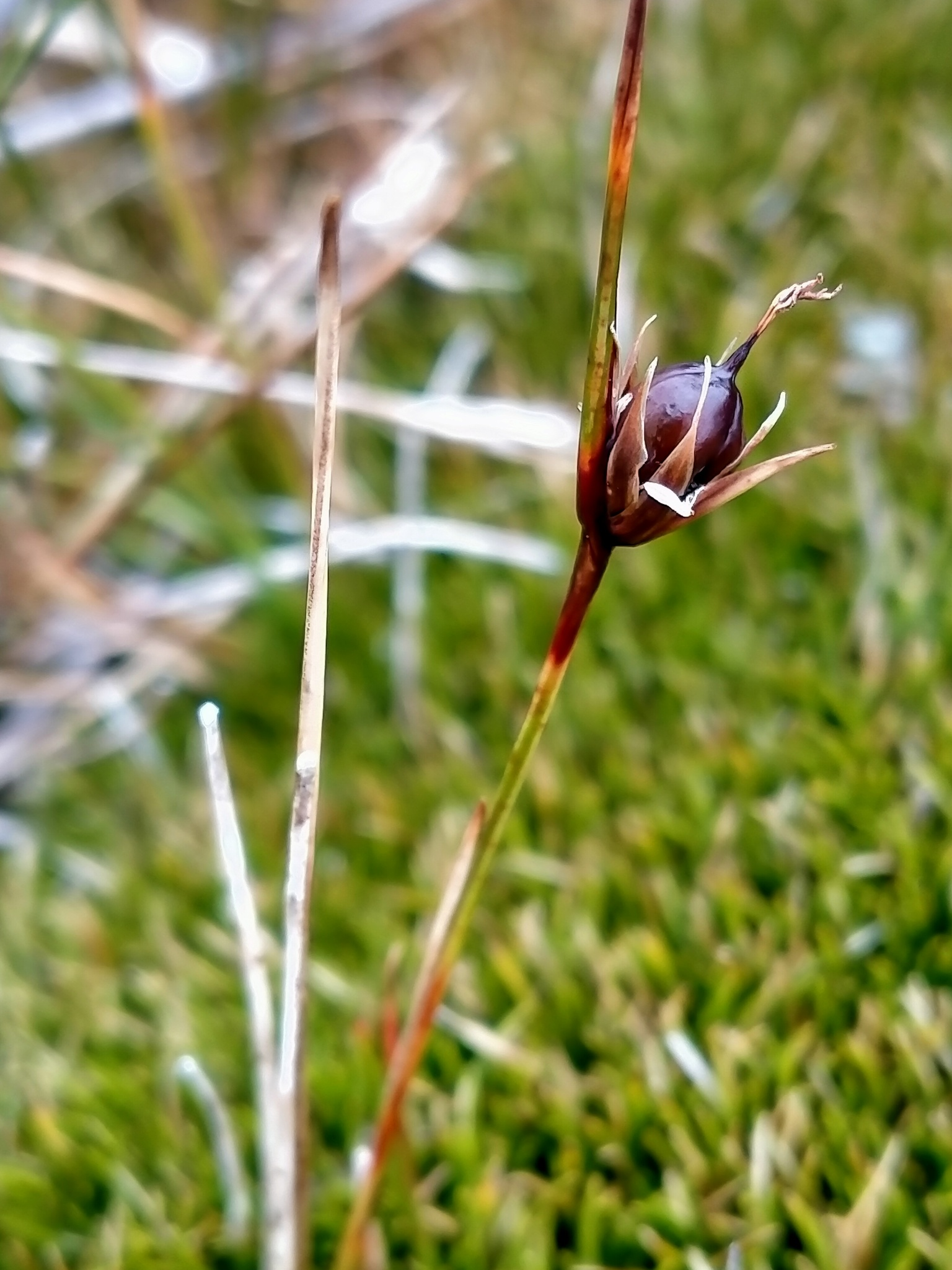
- Rostkovia magellanica

Scientific classification
- Kingdom: Plantae
- Clade: Tracheophytes
- Clade: Angiosperms
- Clade: Monocots
- Clade: Commelinids
- Order: Poales
- Family: Juncaceae
- Genus: Rostkovia; Desv.

= Rostkovia =

Genus of grasses

Rostkovia is a genus of flowering plants in the family Juncaceae. It was described in 1809 and was named after Prussian botanist Friedrich Wilhelm Gottlieb Rostkovius.

The genus is native to Ecuador, southern South America, New Zealand, and various antarctic and subantarctic islands.

Species

- Rostkovia magellanica (Lam.) Hook.f. - South Island of New Zealand, Antipodes Islands, Ecuador, southern Chile, southern Argentina, Falkland Islands, South Georgia Islands
- Rostkovia tristanensis Christoph. - Tristan da Cunha

Formerly included

moved to other genera: Marsippospermum, Patosia

- Rostkovia brevifolia Phil. - Patosia clandestina (Phil.) Buchenau
- Rostkovia clandestina Phil. - Patosia clandestina (Phil.) Buchenau
- Rostkovia gracilis Hook.f. 1844. - Marsippospermum gracile (Hook.f.) Buchenau
- Rostkovia gracilis Phil. 1858 - Marsippospermum philippii (Buchenau) Hauman
- Rostkovia grandiflora (L.f.) Hook.f. - Marsippospermum grandiflorum (L.f.) Hook.
- Rostkovia novae-zelandiae Buchanan - Marsippospermum gracile (Hook.f.) Buchenau
- Rostkovia reichei (Buchenau) Hosseus - Marsippospermum reichei Buchenau
