= Meckel's diverticulum =

Birth defect of a bulge in the small intestine

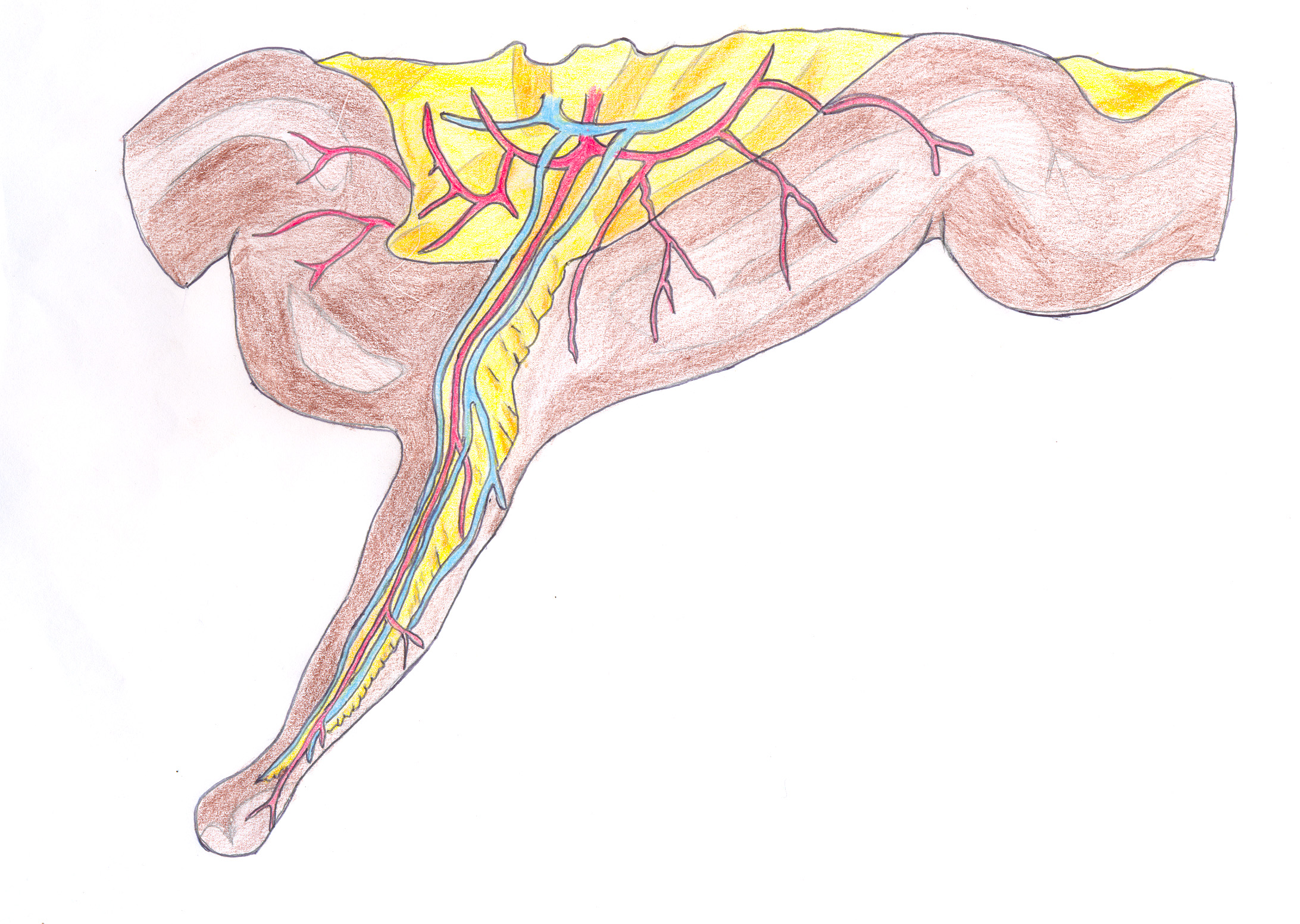
- Schematic drawing of a Meckel's diverticulum with a part of the small intestine.
- Specialty: Medical genetics
- Named after: Johann Friedrich Meckel

A Meckel's diverticulum, a true congenital diverticulum, is a slight bulge in the small intestine present at birth and a vestigial remnant of the vitelline duct. It is the most common malformation of the gastrointestinal tract and is present in approximately 2% of the population, with males more frequently experiencing symptoms.

Meckel's diverticulum was first explained by Fabricius Hildanus in the sixteenth century and later named after Johann Friedrich Meckel, who described the embryological origin of this type of diverticulum in 1809.

== Signs and symptoms ==
The majority of people with a Meckel's diverticulum are asymptomatic. An asymptomatic Meckel's diverticulum is called a silent Meckel's diverticulum. If symptoms do occur, they typically appear before the age of two years. The most common presenting symptom is painless rectal bleeding such as melaena-like black offensive stools, followed by intestinal obstruction, volvulus and intussusception. Occasionally, Meckel's diverticulitis may present with all the features of acute appendicitis. Also, severe pain in the epigastric region is experienced by the person along with bloating in the epigastric and umbilical regions. At times, the symptoms are so painful that they may cause sleepless nights with acute pain felt in the foregut region, specifically in the epigastric and umbilical regions. In some cases, bleeding occurs without warning and may stop spontaneously. The symptoms can be extremely painful, often mistaken as just stomach pain resulting from not eating or constipation. Rarely, a Meckel's diverticulum containing ectopic pancreatic tissue can present with abdominal pain and increased serum amylase levels, mimicking acute pancreatitis.

=== Complications ===
The lifetime risk for a person with Meckel's diverticulum to develop certain complications is about 4–6%. Gastrointestinal bleeding, peritonitis or intestinal obstruction may occur in 15–30% of symptomatic people (Table 1). On rare occasions the diverticulum can herniate through the abdominal wall also known as a Littre hernia. Only 6.4% of all complications require surgical treatment, and untreated Meckel's diverticulum has a mortality rate of 2.5–15%.

Table 1 – Complications of Meckel's Diverticulum:

Complications	Percentage of symptomatic Meckel's Diverticulum (%)
Haemorrhage	20–30
Intestinal obstruction	20–25
Diverticulitis	10–20
Umbilical anomalies	≤10
Neoplasm	0.5-2

==== Bleeding ====
Bleeding of the diverticulum is most common in young children, especially in males who are less than 2 years of age. Symptoms may include bright red blood in stools (hematochezia), weakness, abdominal tenderness or pain, and even anaemia in some cases.

Bleeding may be caused by:

- Ectopic gastric or pancreatic mucosa:
1. Where diverticulum contains embryonic remnants of mucosa of other tissue types.
2. Secretion of gastric acid or alkaline pancreatic juice from the ectopic mucosa leads to ulceration in the adjacent ileal mucosa i.e. peptic or pancreatic ulcer.
3. Pain, bleeding or perforation of the bowel at the diverticulum may result.
4. Mechanical stimulation may also cause erosion and ulceration.
- Gastrointestinal bleeding may be self-limiting but chronic bleeding may lead to iron deficiency anaemia.

The appearance of stools may indicate the nature of the bleeding:

- Tarry stools: Alteration of blood produced by slow bowel transit due to minor bleeding in upper gastrointestinal tract
- Bright red blood stools: Brisk bleeding
- Stools with blood streak: Anal fissure
- "Currant jelly" stools: Ischaemia of the intestine leads to copious mucus production and may indicate that one part of the bowel invaginates into another (intussusception).

==== Diverticulitis ====
Inflammation of the diverticulum can mimic symptoms of appendicitis, i.e., periumbilical tenderness and intermittent crampy abdominal pain. Perforation of the inflamed diverticulum can result in peritonitis. Diverticulitis can also cause adhesions, leading to intestinal obstruction.

Diverticulitis may result from:

- Association with the mesodiverticular band attaching to the diverticulum tip where torsion has occurred, causing inflammation and ischaemia.
- Peptic ulceration resulting from ectopic gastric mucosa of the diverticulum
- Perforation by trauma or ingested foreign material (e.g., vegetable stalks, seeds, or fish/chicken bones) that become lodged in the Meckel's diverticulum.
- Luminal obstruction due to tumors, enterolith, or another foreign body, causing stasis or bacterial infection.
- Association with acute appendicitis

==== Intestinal obstruction ====
Symptoms: Vomiting, abdominal pain and severe or complete constipation.

- The vitelline vessels remnant that connects the diverticulum to the umbilicus may form a fibrous or twisting band (volvulus), trapping the small intestine and causing obstruction. Localised periumbilical pain may be experienced in the right lower quadrant (like appendicitis).
- "Incarceration": when a Meckel's diverticulum is constricted in an inguinal hernia, forming a Littré hernia that obstructs the intestine.
- Chronic diverticulitis causing stricture
- Strangulation of the diverticulum in the obturator foramen.
- Tumors e.g. carcinoma: direct spread of an adenocarcinoma arising in the diverticulum may lead to obstruction
- Lithiasis, stones that are formed in Meckel's diverticulum can:
1. Extrude into the terminal ileum, leading to obstruction
2. Induce local inflammation and intussusception.
- The diverticulum itself or a tumour within it may cause intussusception – for example, from the ileum to the colon – causing obstruction. Symptoms of this include "currant jelly" stools and a palpable lump in the lower abdomen. This occurs when the diverticulum inverts into the lumen of the ileum, due to either:
1. An active peristaltic mechanism of the diverticulum that attempts to remove irritating factors
2. A passive process such as the transit of food

==== Umbilical anomalies ====
Anomalies between the diverticulum and umbilicus may include the presence of a fibrous cord, cyst, fistula, or sinus, leading to:

- Infection or excoriation of periumbilical skin, resulting in a discharging sinus
- Recurrent infection and healing of sinus
- Abscess formation in the abdominal wall
- Increased risk of volvulus formation and internal herniation

==== Tumors ====
Neoplasms (tumors) in Meckel's diverticulum may cause bleeding, acute abdominal pain, gastrointestinal obstruction, perforation or intussusception. They may be benign or malignant.

- Benign tumors:
1. Leiomyoma
2. Lipoma
3. Vascular and neuromuscular hamartoma
- Malignant tumors:
1. Carcinoids: most common, 44%
2. Mesenchymal tumors: Leiomyosarcoma, peripheral nerve sheath and gastrointestinal stromal tumors, 35%
3. Adenocarcinoma, 16%
4. Desmoplastic small round cell tumor

==== Other complications ====
- A diverticulum inside a Meckel's diverticulum (daughter diverticula)
- Stones and phytobezoar (a bezoar of vegetable fibers) in Meckel's diverticulum
- Vesicodiverticular fistula

== Pathophysiology ==
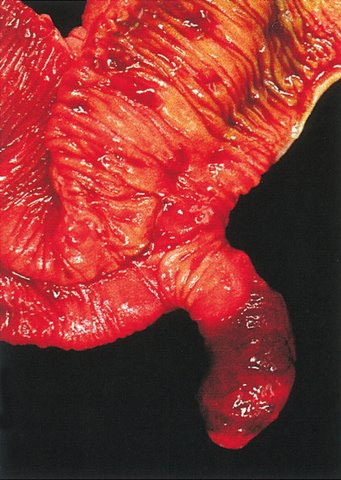
Meckel's diverticulum surgical specimen

The omphalomesenteric duct (omphaloenteric duct, vitelline duct, or yolk stalk) normally connects the embryonic midgut to the yolk sac ventrally, providing nutrients to the midgut during embryonic development. The vitelline duct narrows progressively and disappears between the 5th and 8th weeks of gestation.

In Meckel's diverticulum, the proximal part of vitelline duct fails to regress and involute, which remains as a remnant of variable length and location. The solitary diverticulum lies on the antimesenteric border of the ileum (opposite to the mesenteric attachment) and extends into the umbilical cord of the embryo. The left and right vitelline arteries originate from the primitive dorsal aorta, and travel with the vitelline duct. The right becomes the superior mesenteric artery that supplies a terminal branch to the diverticulum, while the left involutes. Having its own blood supply, Meckel's diverticulum is susceptible to obstruction or infection.

Meckel's diverticulum is located in the distal ileum, usually within 60–100 cm (2 feet) of the ileocecal valve. This blind segment or small pouch is about 3–6 cm (2 inch) long and may have a greater lumen diameter than that of the ileum. It runs antimesenterically and has its own blood supply. It is a remnant of the connection from the yolk sac to the small intestine present during embryonic development. It is a true diverticulum, consisting of all three layers of the bowel wall: mucosa, submucosa and muscularis propria.

As the vitelline duct is made up of pluripotent cell lining, Meckel's diverticulum may harbor abnormal tissues, containing embryonic remnants of other tissue types. Jejunal, duodenal mucosa or Brunner's tissue were each found in 2% of ectopic cases. Heterotopic rests of gastric mucosa and pancreatic tissue are seen in 60% and 6% of cases respectively. Heterotopic means the displacement of an organ from its normal anatomic location. Inflammation of this Meckel's diverticulum may mimic appendicitis. Therefore, during appendectomy, ileum should be checked for the presence of Meckel's diverticulum, if it is found to be present it should be removed along with appendix.

A memory aid is the rule of 2s:

- 2% (of the population)
- 2 feet (proximal to the ileocecal valve)
- 2 inches (in length)
- 2 types of common ectopic tissue (gastric and pancreatic)
- 2 years is the most common age at clinical presentation
- 2:1 male:female ratio

However, the exact values for the above criteria range from 0.2–5 (for example, prevalence is probably 0.2–4%).

It can also be present as an indirect hernia, typically on the right side, where it is known as a "Hernia of Littré". A case report of strangulated umbilical hernia with Meckel's diverticulum has also been published in the literature. Furthermore, it can be attached to the umbilical region by the vitelline ligament, with the possibility of vitelline cysts, or even a patent vitelline canal forming a vitelline fistula when the umbilical cord is cut. Torsions of intestine around the intestinal stalk may also occur, leading to obstruction, ischemia, and necrosis.

== Diagnosis ==
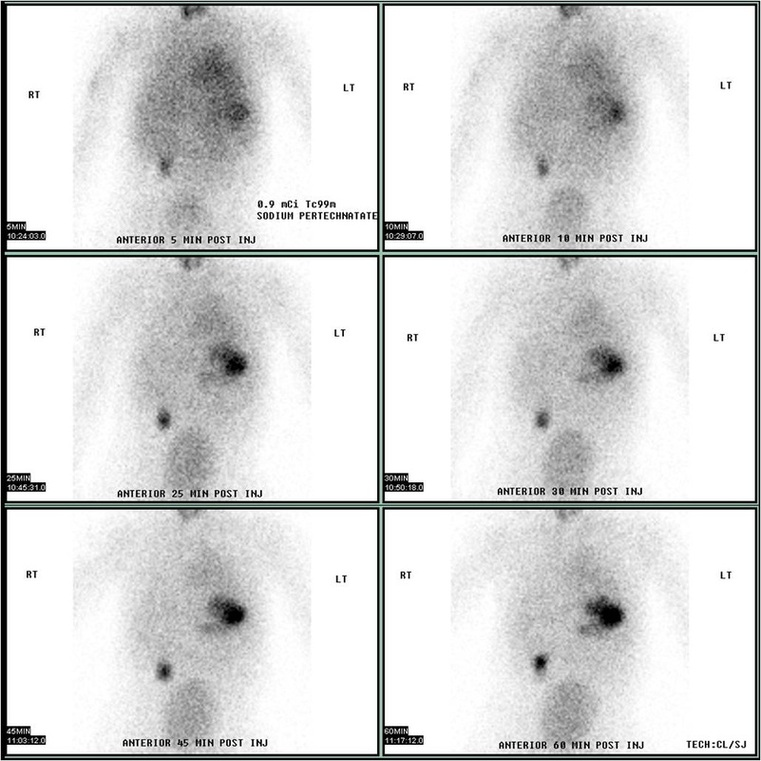
Technetium-99m Pertechnetate Scan with a Meckel's Diverticulum.

A technetium-99m (99mTc) pertechnetate scan, also called Meckel scan or nuclear scintigraphy scan, is the investigation of choice to diagnose Meckel's diverticula in children. This scan detects gastric mucosa; since approximately 50% of symptomatic Meckel's diverticula have ectopic gastric or pancreatic cells contained within them, this is displayed as a spot on the scan distant from the stomach itself. In children, this scan is highly accurate and noninvasive, with 95% specificity and 85% sensitivity; however, in adults the test is only 9% specific and 62% sensitive. This scan is more accurate in children because gastric mucosa is found in 90% of bleeding diverticula; which is the most common symptom in children, not adults.

Patients with these misplaced gastric cells may experience peptic ulcers as a consequence. Therefore, other tests such as colonoscopy and screenings for bleeding disorders should be performed, and angiography can assist in determining the location and severity of bleeding. Colonoscopy might be helpful to rule out other sources of bleeding but it is not used as an identification tool.

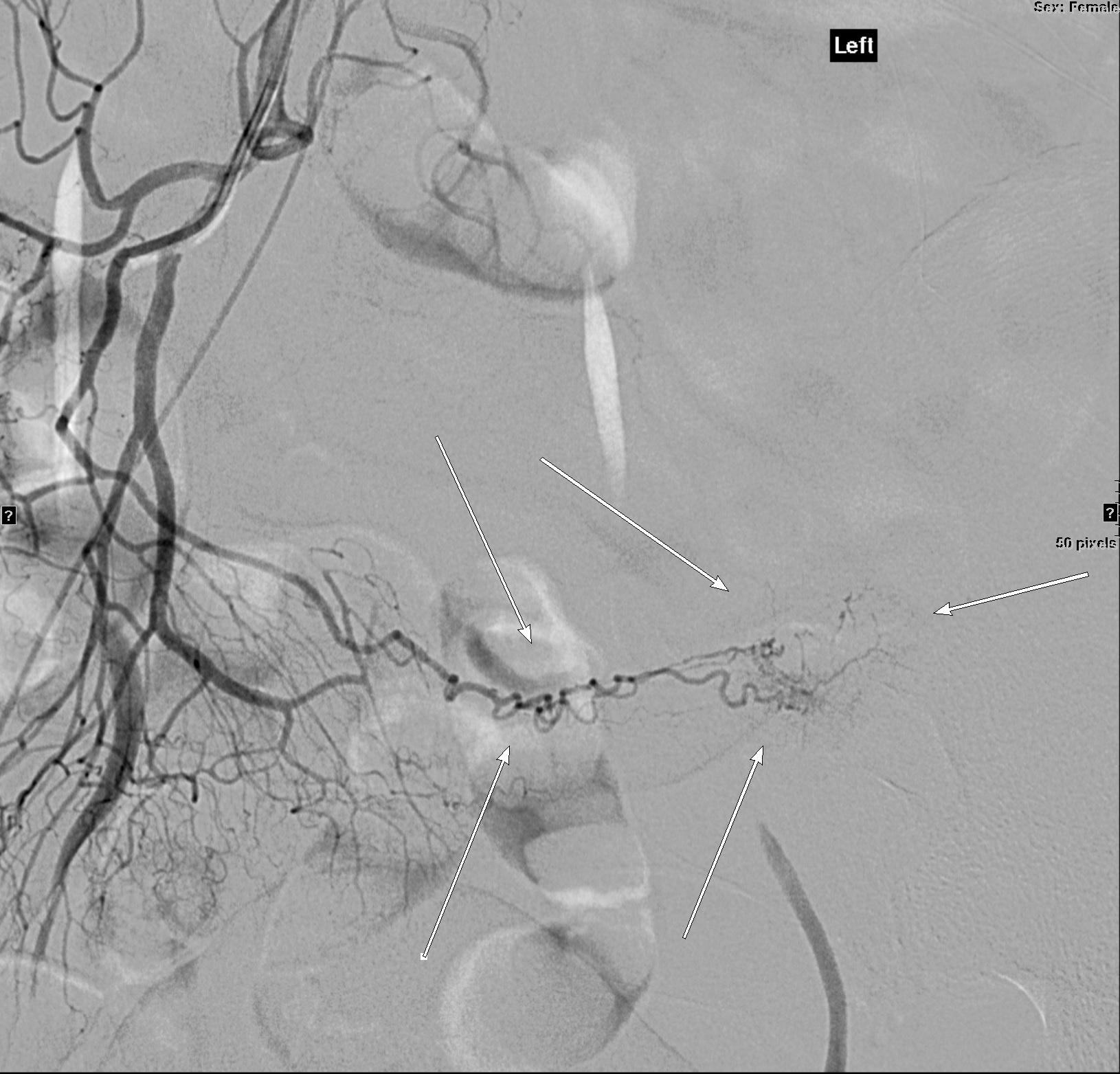
Angiography of a Meckel's diverticulum that presented with bleeding.

Angiography might identify brisk bleeding in patients with Meckel's diverticulum.

Ultrasonography could demonstrate omphaloenteric duct remnants or cysts. Computed tomography (CT scan) might be a useful tool to demonstrate a blind ended and inflamed structure in the mid-abdominal cavity, which is not an appendix.

In asymptomatic patients, Meckel's diverticulum is often diagnosed as an incidental finding during laparoscopy or laparotomy.

== Treatment ==
Treatment is surgical, potentially with a laparoscopic resection. In patients with bleeding, strangulation of bowel, bowel perforation or bowel obstruction, treatment involves surgical resection of both the Meckel's diverticulum itself along with the adjacent bowel segment, and this procedure is called a "small bowel resection". In patients without any of the aforementioned complications, treatment involves surgical resection of the Meckel's diverticulum only, and this procedure is called a simple diverticulectomy.

With regards to asymptomatic Meckel's diverticulum, some recommend that a search for Meckel's diverticulum should be conducted in every case of appendectomy/laparotomy done for acute abdomen, and if found, Meckel's diverticulectomy or resection should be performed to avoid secondary complications arising from it.

== Epidemiology ==
Meckel's diverticulum occurs in about 2% of the population. Prevalence in males is 3–5 times higher than in females. Only 2% of cases are symptomatic, which usually presents among children at the age of 2.

Most cases of Meckel's diverticulum are diagnosed when complications manifest or incidentally in unrelated conditions such as laparotomy, laparoscopy or contrast study of the small intestine. Classic presentation in adults includes intestinal obstruction and inflammation of the diverticulum (diverticulitis). Painless rectal bleeding most commonly occurs in toddlers.

Inflammation in the ileal diverticulum has symptoms that mimic appendicitis, therefore its diagnosis is of clinical importance. Detailed knowledge of the pathophysiological properties is essential in dealing with the life-threatening complications of Meckel's diverticulum.
