= Rostkovia tristanensis =

Conservation status
- Data Deficient (IUCN 3.1)

Scientific classification
- Kingdom: Plantae
- Clade: Tracheophytes
- Clade: Angiosperms
- Clade: Monocots
- Clade: Commelinids
- Order: Poales
- Family: Juncaceae
- Genus: Rostkovia
- Species: R. tristanensis

Binomial name
- Rostkovia tristanensis Christoph.

Species of grass

Rostkovia tristanensis is a species of flowering plant in the family Juncaceae, the rushes. It is endemic to Tristan da Cunha, where it occurs only on the main island and Gough Island. It grows in heath habitat with Empetrum. It is not uncommon on Gough Island, but it is rarely seen in flower.
