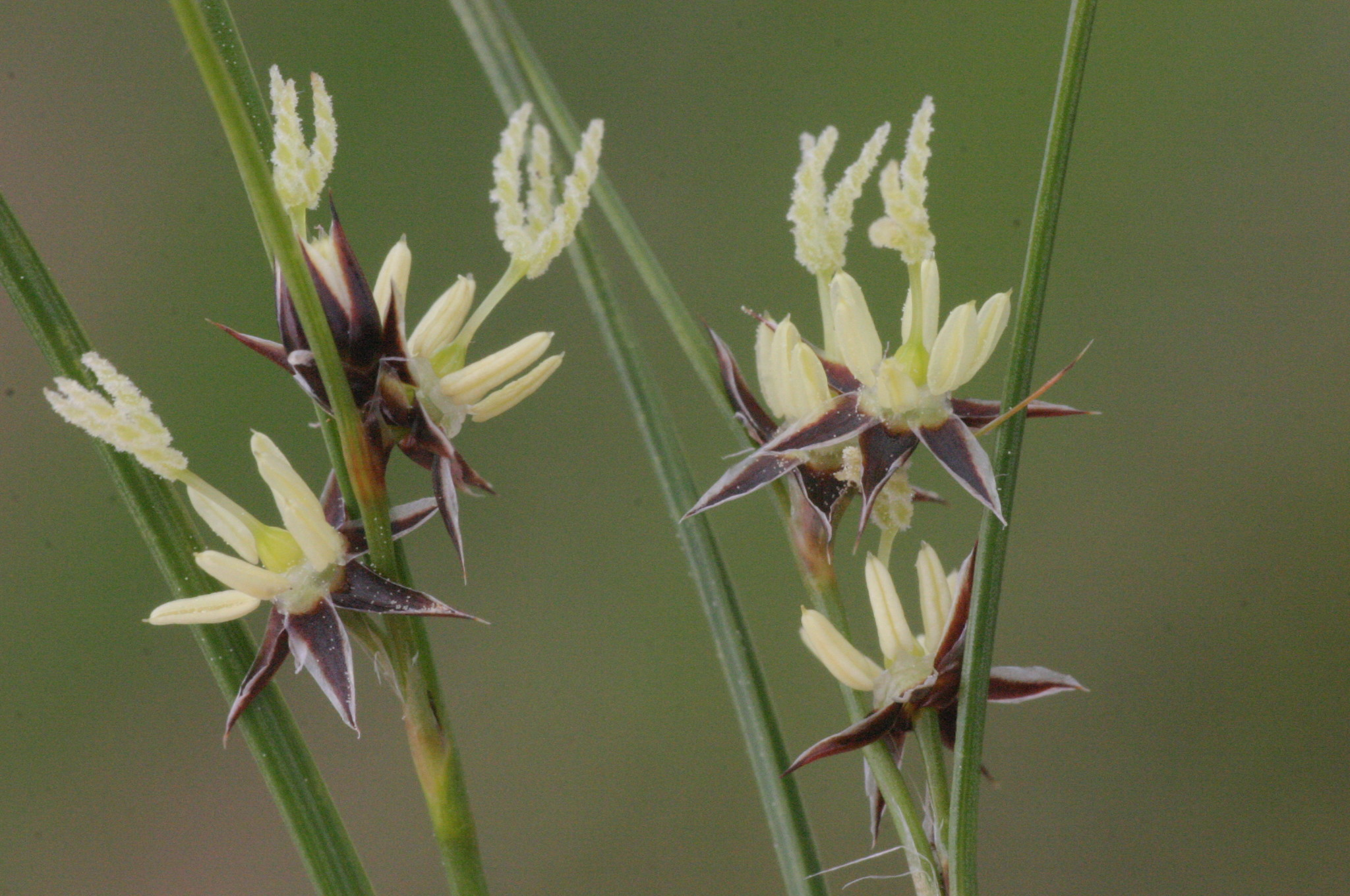

Scientific classification
- Kingdom: Plantae
- Clade: Tracheophytes
- Clade: Angiosperms
- Clade: Monocots
- Clade: Commelinids
- Order: Poales
- Family: Juncaceae
- Genus: Oreojuncus
- Species: O. trifidus

Binomial name
- Oreojuncus trifidus L. Záv.Drábk. & Kirschner

Synonyms
- Juncus alpestris Bubani; Juncus trifidus L.; Juncus trifidus subsp. carolinianus Hämet-Ahti

= Oreojuncus trifidus =

Species of rush

Oreojuncus trifidus is a species of rush known by the common names highland rush and three-leaved rush. It is native to the Northern Hemisphere, where it is an arctic/montane species with an amphi-atlantic distribution.

== Description ==
Oreojuncus trifidus is a perennial herb with tufted stems up to 40 centimeters long, growing erect or drooping. There are a few grasslike leaf blades measuring up to 12 centimeters long. The inflorescence holds one to four flowers with brown tepals and six stamens. The fruit is a capsule a few millimeters long. The plant reproduces sexually with its flowering structures and vegetatively via its rhizome, when it may form colonies.

== Habitat ==
This species grows in a number of habitat types, especially in alpine environments. It can be found in talus, on cliffs and ledges, fellfields, tundra, and meadows. It grows in a wide variety of heath ecosystems. The soils may be dry to moist, calcareous, and acidic. They may be gravelly, sandy, and rich in iron. The plant is known as a pioneer on ski slopes and roadsides. It may grow alongside many types of mosses and lichens.

== Distribution ==
Oreojuncus trifidus is an amphi-atlantic plant, native to northern and eastern Canada, including the Canadian Arctic Archipelago and other low Arctic regions, the northeastern United States, Greenland, Iceland, Scandinavia, northern Britain, and northern Asia. It also occurs in the high mountains of southern Europe. While not rare in general, the plant faces threats in some locations. Some populations in the Adirondacks are harmed by trampling by hikers. Rush habitat on Camel's Hump and Mount Marcy also suffers from trampling disturbance. Rush-dominated heath in the Cairngorms is also potentially threatened by trampling.
