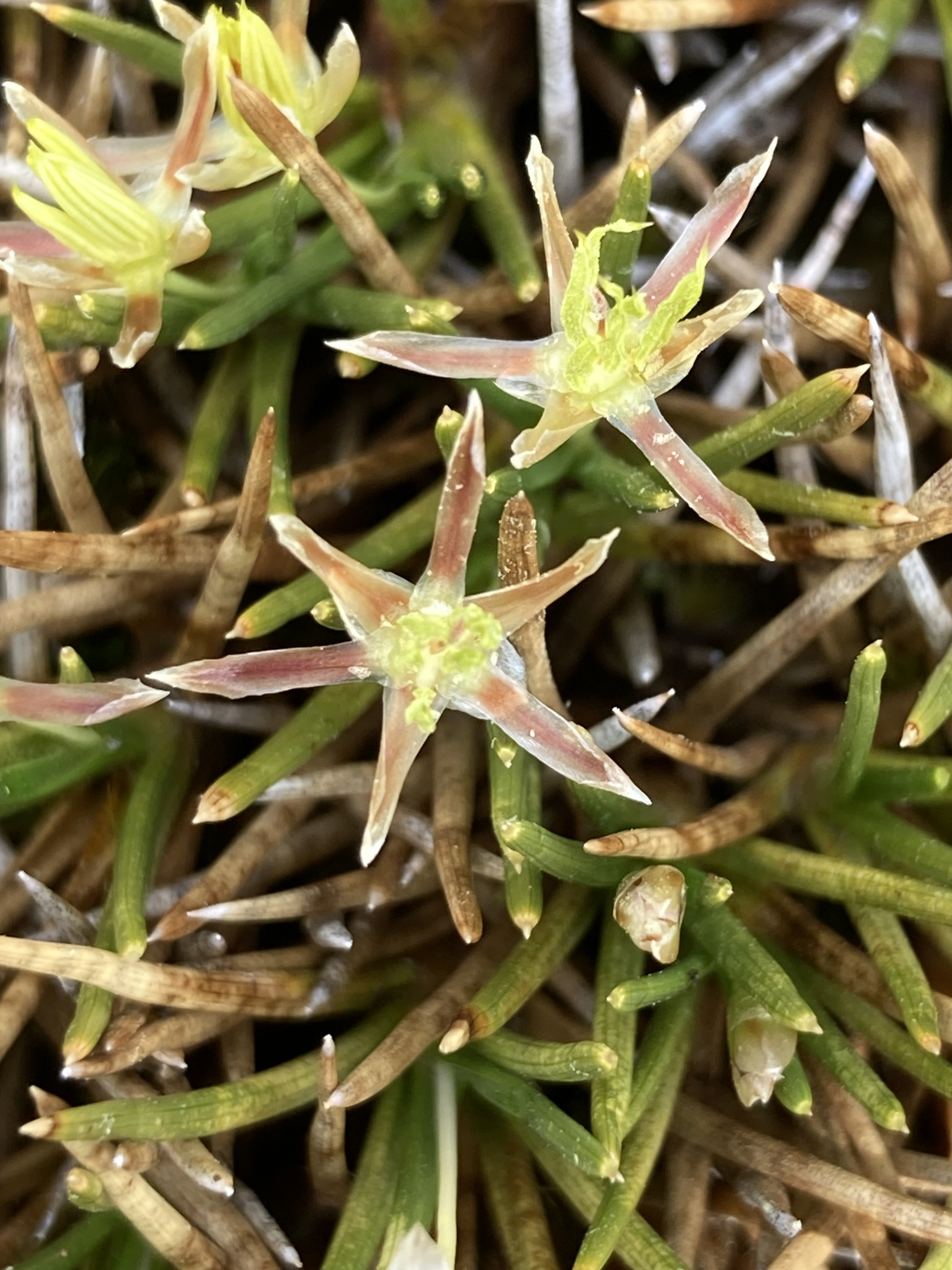
- O. andina

Scientific classification
- Kingdom: Plantae
- Clade: Tracheophytes
- Clade: Angiosperms
- Clade: Monocots
- Clade: Commelinids
- Order: Poales
- Family: Juncaceae
- Genus: Oxychloe; Phil.

Synonyms
- Andesia Hauman; Oxychloë Phil., alternative spelling

= Oxychloe =

Genus of grasses

Oxychloe is a genus of flowering plants in the family Juncaceae. It was described as a genus in 1860.

The genus is native to the Andes of South America.

== Species ==
The accepted species in this genus are:

- Oxychloe andina Phil. - Bolivia, Peru, NW Argentina, N Chile
- Oxychloe bisexualis Kuntze - W Argentina, N Chile
- Oxychloe castellanosii Barros - San Juan + La Rioja Provinces of Argentina
- Oxychloe haumaniana (Barros) Barros - San Juan Province of Argentina
- Oxychloe mendocina Barros - Mendoza Province of Argentina

Formerly included:

moved to Patosia

- Oxychloe brevifolia (Phil.) Buchenau - Patosia clandestina (Phil.) Buchenau
- Oxychloe clandestina (Buchenau) Hauman - Patosia clandestina (Phil.) Buchenau
