= Friedrich Wilhelm Gottlieb Rostkovius =

Friedrich Wilhelm Gottlieb Theophil Rostkovius (1770–1848) was a German medical doctor, mycologist and botanist.

In 1801, he received his doctorate from the University of Halle with the thesis Dissertatio Botanica Inauguralis De Junco (treatise on rushes), studying under Carl Ludwig Willdenow. He later settled in Stettin as a medical practitioner and continued to study plants and fungi, and publish on them.

The plant genus Rostkovia from the family Juncaceae was named in his honor by Nicaise Auguste Desvaux (1784-1856). His name is also associated with the species Euphrasia rostkoviana.

Rostkovius died on 17 August 1848.

== Written works ==
- Monographia generis iunci, 1801; with Philipp Friedrich Theodor Meckel (1755–1803).
- Flora Sedinensis, exhibens plantas phanerogamas spontaneas nec non plantas praecipuas agri Swinemundii, 1824; with Wilhelm Ludwig Ewald Schmidt (1805–1843).
- Die Pilze Deutschlands: Deutschlands Flora in Abbildungen nach der Natur mit Beschreibungen. Abt. 3, Volume 5; Volumes 21–22, 1844; with August Karl Joseph Corda (1809–1849) - German fungi : German flora in pictures from nature with descriptions.
- Deutschlands Flora in Abbildungen nach der Natur mit Beschreibungen, 1844; with Jacob Sturm (1771–1848) and Johann Wilhelm Sturm (1808–1865) - German flora in pictures from nature with descriptions.
