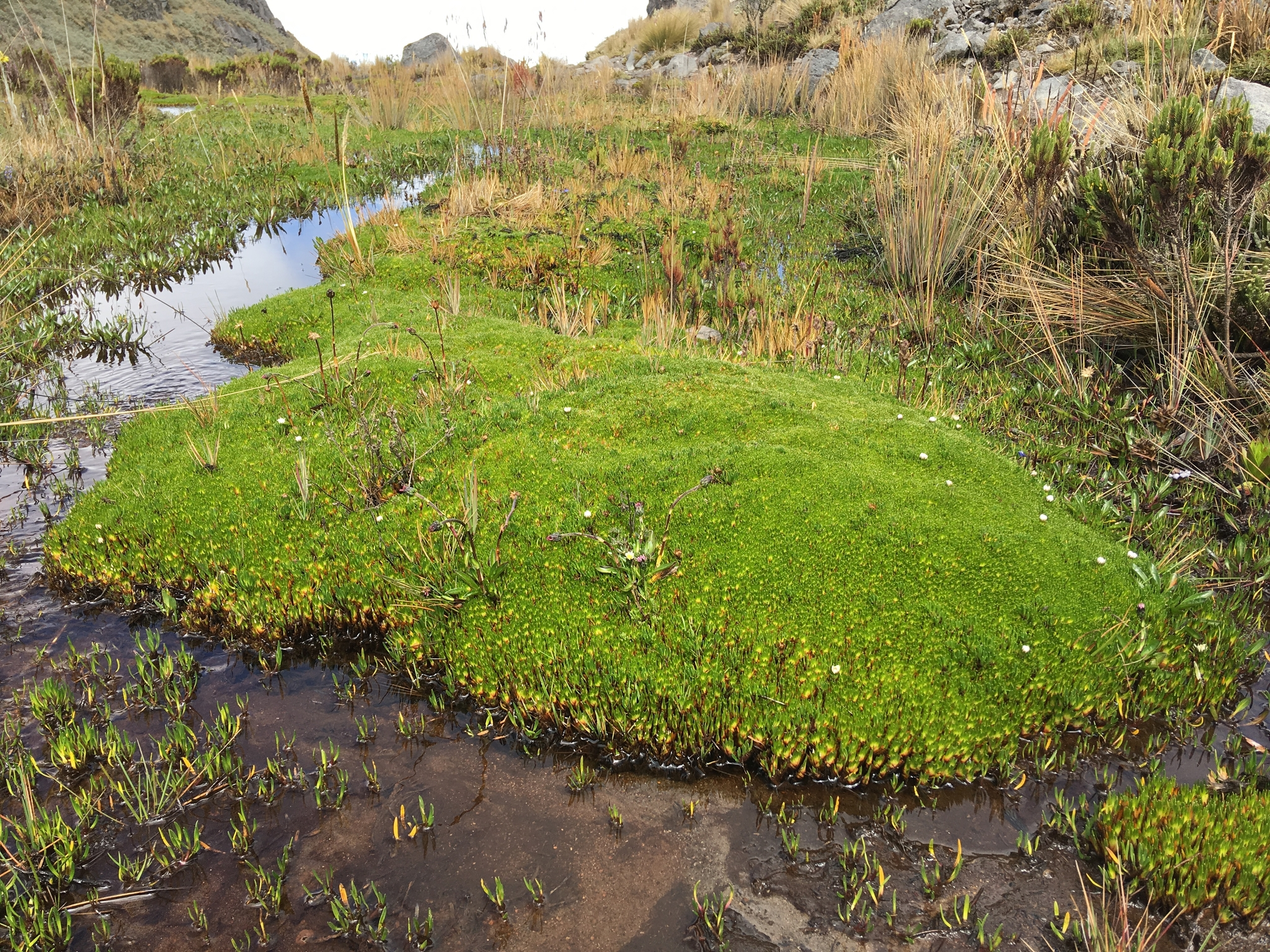
- In Los Nevados National Natural Park, Colombia, November 2018

Scientific classification
- Kingdom: Plantae
- Clade: Tracheophytes
- Clade: Angiosperms
- Clade: Monocots
- Clade: Commelinids
- Order: Poales
- Family: Juncaceae
- Genus: Distichia
- Species: D. muscoides

Binomial name
- Distichia muscoides Nees & Meyen

Synonyms
- Agapatea peruviana Steud.; Distichia tolimensis (Decne.) Buchenau; Gaimardia boliviana Pax; Goudotia tolimensis Decne.

= Distichia muscoides =

Species of flowering plant in the rush family Juncaceae

Distichia muscoides is a species of plant in the rush family Juncaceae. It is native to the Andes of South America where it grows in upland wetland areas known as bofedales.

== Description ==
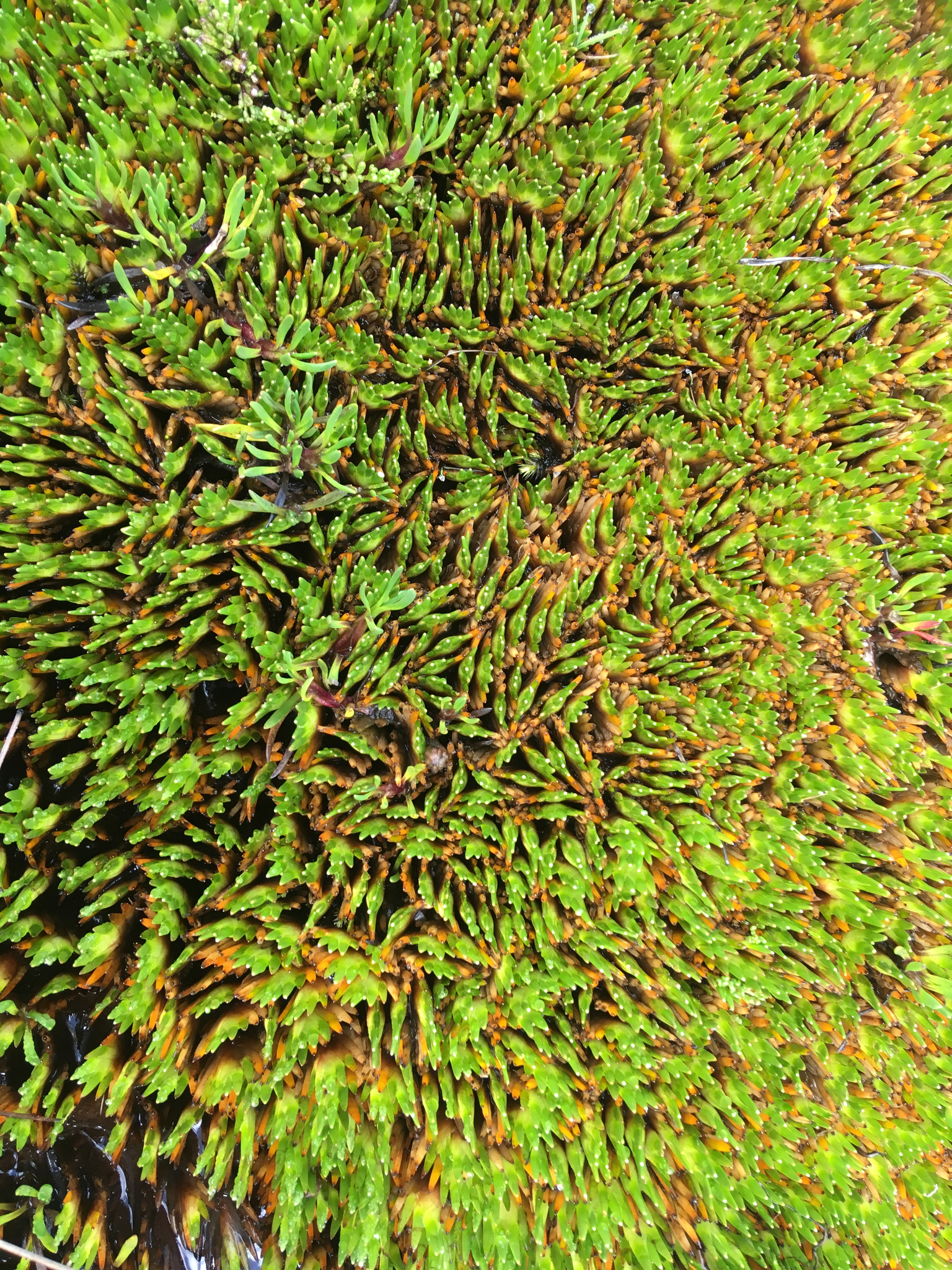
Close-up

Distichia muscoides is a cushion plant, forming sheets or clumps of short, densely-packed, evergreen stems and leaves forming a firm, relatively flat surface; the individual shoots and leaves are only a few millimetres long and grow throughout the year. In favourable locations, growth can be as much as 5 cm (2 in) a year.

== Distribution and habitat ==
Distichia muscoides is found at high altitudes in Colombia, Ecuador, Peru, Bolivia and northwestern Argentina. It forms large cushions in the tropical Andes, dominating the flora of the high level, peat-accumulating uplands, locally known as "bofedales". These areas have high water tables and thick layers of peat up to about 5 m (16 ft) thick.

== Ecology ==
In the Colombia mountain ranges, D. muscoides forms an important constituent of the cushion bog, in association with Plantago rigida and Oreobolus cleefii. In the tropical Cordillera in Peru, the upland wetland areas are called bofedales; the peatlands have cushions of Distichia muscoides with mosses, including Sphagnum, Vaccinium floribundum, Puya, and Loricaria ferruginea. Other plant communities in the bofedales include peaty meadows with grasses, mosses (but not Sphagnum), sedges, rushes and woodrushes, and streamside grassland consisting mainly of Plantago tubulosa and Werneria pygmaea.

The bofedales provide grazing for guanacos, vicuñas, white-tailed deer, taruca and viscacha, are visited by ducks, the Andean goose and other birds, and provide habitat for various rodents, the Andean fox and the pampas cat. Because D. muscoides is evergreen, it provides important all-year-round grazing for domestic llamas and alpacas, as well as introduced sheep and cattle. However, the climate is becoming drier and warmer in the High Andes, the glaciers that provide meltwater to the bofedales are shrinking, the water table is becoming lower for long periods, precipitation is decreasing, and grazing pressure is high. These climatic conditions are likely to be unfavourable for D. muscoides, with the bofedales dwindling in some areas, becoming converted into puna grasslands, dominated by coarse bunch grasses which are much less nutritious for livestock.
