= Juncus minutulus =

Scientific classification
- Kingdom: Plantae
- Clade: Tracheophytes
- Clade: Angiosperms
- Clade: Monocots
- Clade: Commelinids
- Order: Poales
- Family: Juncaceae
- Genus: Juncus
- Species: J. minutulus

Binomial name
- Juncus minutulus (Albert & Jahand.) Prain

Species of plant

Juncus minutulus is a species of rush (Juncaceae) informally referred to as minute rush, dwarf toad rush and annual rush.

== Description ==
An annual, resembling and easily confused with a tiny Juncus bufonius with all parts smaller and with flowers rarely opening (cleistogamous): fruit capsule 2.5-3.0mm, stamens usually (2)3 instead of 6, anthers 1/4-1/3 x filaments (not 1/3-1 x), tepals usually shorter than 4mm, inner tepals acute (not long-tapering), 0-1(2) stem leaves, 1–3cm long.

J. bufonius also has cleistogamous forms that can very much resemble this in these features therefore all features should be examined carefully (such as inner tepal tip shape).

== Range ==
Europe & North Asia, possibly cosmopolitan but reliable records are limited.

== Habitat ==
Similar to Juncus bufonius with which it may grow.

Turkey: Wet or temporarily wet, usually open soil, 0–1800 m.

Spain: Wet pastures or those in temporarily flooded places, on somewhat saline soils; 0-2900m ("Pastos húmedos o de lugares temporalmente inundados, en suelos algo salinos; 0-2900 m").

Istria: Wet roads, fields, ruderal regions.

Siberia: In wet lowlands, along banks of water reservoirs.
