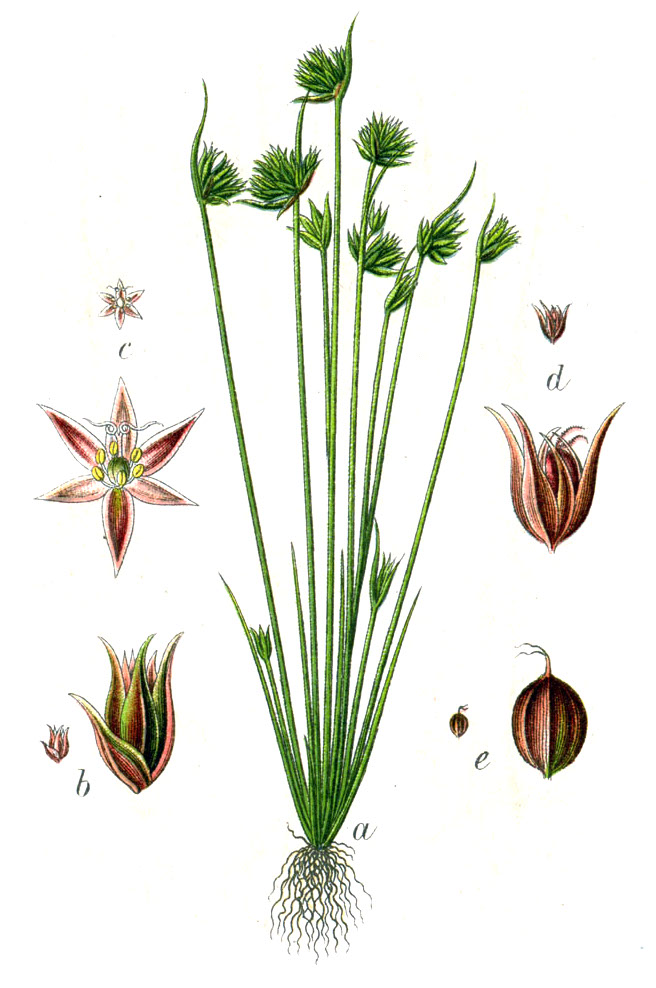
- 1796 illustration

Scientific classification
- Kingdom: Plantae
- Clade: Tracheophytes
- Clade: Angiosperms
- Clade: Monocots
- Clade: Commelinids
- Order: Poales
- Family: Juncaceae
- Genus: Juncinella
- Species: J. capitata

Binomial name
- Juncinella capitata (Weigel) Záv.Drábk. & Proćków

Synonyms
- Juncus capitatus Weigel (1772) (basionym); Juncus capitatus var. congestus Ten.; Juncus capitatus f. physcomitrioides (Baen.) Neuman; Juncus capitatus var. physcomitrioides Baen.; Juncus capitatus var. setaceus Nyman; Juncus capitatus subsp. setaceus K.Richt.; Juncus capitatus var. triandrus Asch.; Juncus capitatus triandrus (Asch.) Asch. & Graebn.; Juncus capitatus f. umbelliformis Merino; Juncus capitatus versicolor Asch. & Graebn.; Juncus capitatus virescens Asch. & Graebn.; Juncus ericetorum Pollich; Juncus globiceps Bajtenov; Juncus gracilis Roth; Juncus gracilis var. capitatus Roth; Juncus mutabilis Lam.; Juncus tenellus S.Geuns; Juncus triandrus Gouan; Schoenus minimus T.F.Forst.

= Juncinella capitata =

Species of rush

Juncinella capitata (synonym Juncus capitatus) is a species of rush known by the common names dwarf rush and leafybract dwarf rush. It is native to Europe, parts of western and central Asia, and parts of northern, eastern, west-central, and southern Africa. It is also an introduced species in parts of North America such as California and the Gulf Coast. It grows in moist areas, such as wet sand, vernal pools, and ditches.

The species was first described as Juncus capitatus by Christian Ehrenfried Weigel in 1772. In 2023 Lenka Záveská Drábková and Jarosław Proćków placed the species in the newly-described genus Juncinella as Juncinella capitata.

== Description ==
The dwarf rush is a small annual herb not exceeding ten centimeters in height. The stems are erect and thready, flat or somewhat corrugated. The leaves are basal and up to 3 or 4 centimeters long. The plant is green to red or brownish in color. Each stem bears an inflorescence of up to six clustered flowers. The pointed bracts at the base of the inflorescence are often over a centimeter long, longer the flower cluster itself, and are somewhat leaflike, giving the species its common name. Each flower has pointed outer tepals and thinner, shorter, oval-shaped inner tepals. There are three stamens. The fruit is a tiny oval-shaped capsule one to two millimeters long.

== Distribution and habitat ==
The dwarf rush is native to Europe, parts of Western Asia (East Aegean Islands, Turkey, and the Levant), Kazakhstan, and North Africa (Algeria, Libya, Morocco, and Tunisia), East Africa (Ethiopia and Kenya), west-central Africa (Cameroon), and southern Africa (Lesotho and the Cape Provinces, Northern Provinces, and Free State of South Africa). In the British Isles it is only known from Anglesey, Cornwall and the Channel Islands, and is rare in all these locations. It germinates in autumn and grows in places where water stands in winter and which dry up completely in summer, meaning the plant faces little competition. These locations include rock ledges on sea cliffs, around outcrops of serpentine rock and in dune slacks. In some locations it has sometimes been thought to be locally extinct, but then reappeared later.
