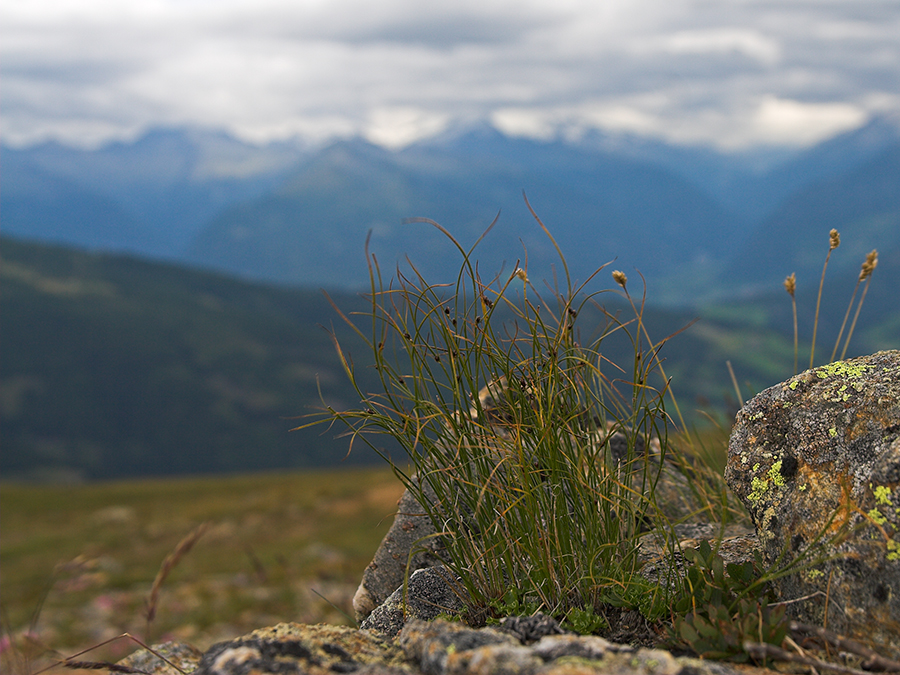
- Oreojuncus trifidus

Scientific classification
- Kingdom: Plantae
- Clade: Tracheophytes
- Clade: Angiosperms
- Clade: Monocots
- Clade: Commelinids
- Order: Poales
- Family: Juncaceae
- Genus: Oreojuncus; Záv.Drábk. & Kirschner

Species
- See text

= Oreojuncus =

Genus of Juncaceae plants

Oreojuncus is a small genus of flowering plants in the rush family Juncaceae, found in the eastern United States, eastern Canada, Greenland, Iceland, the Faroes, most of Europe, northern Russia, western Siberia and the Altai. Their chromosome number is 2n=30 (x=15), whereas Juncus, from which they were split, has x=20.

== Species ==
Currently accepted species include:

- Oreojuncus monanthos (Jacq.) Záv.Drábk. & Kirschner
- Oreojuncus trifidus (L.) Záv.Drábk. & Kirschner
