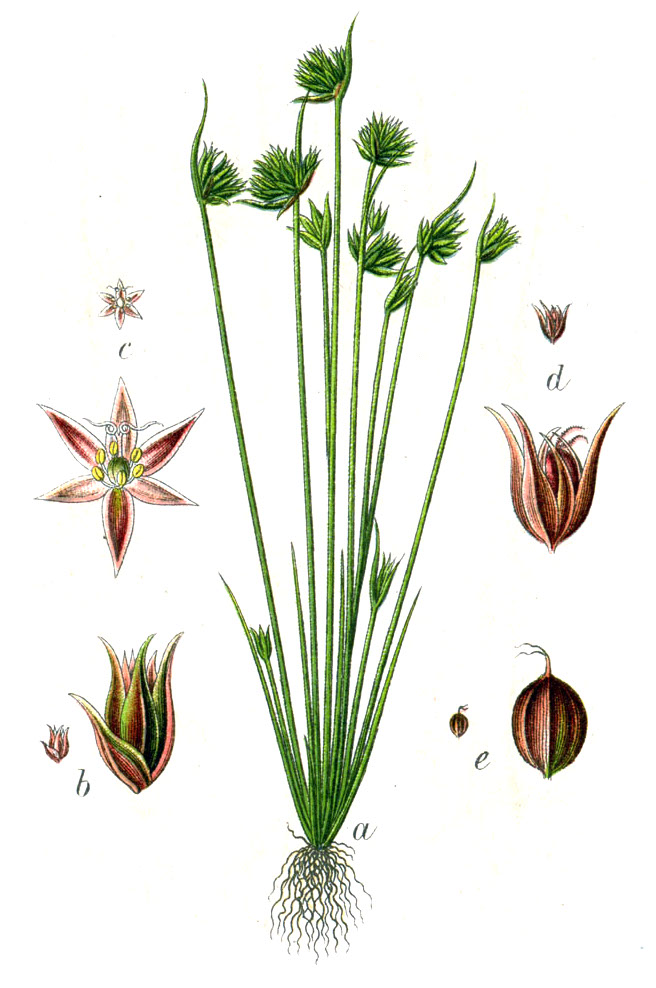
- Juncinella capitata

Scientific classification
- Kingdom: Plantae
- Clade: Tracheophytes
- Clade: Angiosperms
- Clade: Monocots
- Clade: Commelinids
- Order: Poales
- Family: Juncaceae
- Genus: Juncinella; Záv.Drábk. & Proćków

= Juncinella =

Genus of flowering plants

Juncinella is a genus of flowering plants in the family Juncaceae. It includes seven species of rushes native to Africa, Europe, and parts of western and Central Asia.

The species in the genus were formerly placed in the large genus Juncus. In 2022 Viktorie Brožová et al. published a phylogenetic analysis of the cyperids (families Juncaceae, Cyperaceae, and Thurniaceae) which found the genus Juncus to be paraphyletic, and the authors proposed that six new genera, including Juncinella, be split from Juncus.

== Species ==
Seven species are accepted.

- Juncinella capitata (Weigel) Záv.Drábk. & Proćków
- Juncinella cephalotes (Thunb.) Záv.Drábk. & Proćków
- Juncinella obliqua (Adamson) Záv.Drábk. & Proćków
- Juncinella picta (Steud.) Záv.Drábk. & Proćków
- Juncinella rupestris (Kunth) Záv.Drábk. & Proćków
- Juncinella scabriuscula (Kunth) Záv.Drábk. & Proćków
- Juncinella stenopetala (Adamson) Záv.Drábk. & Proćków
