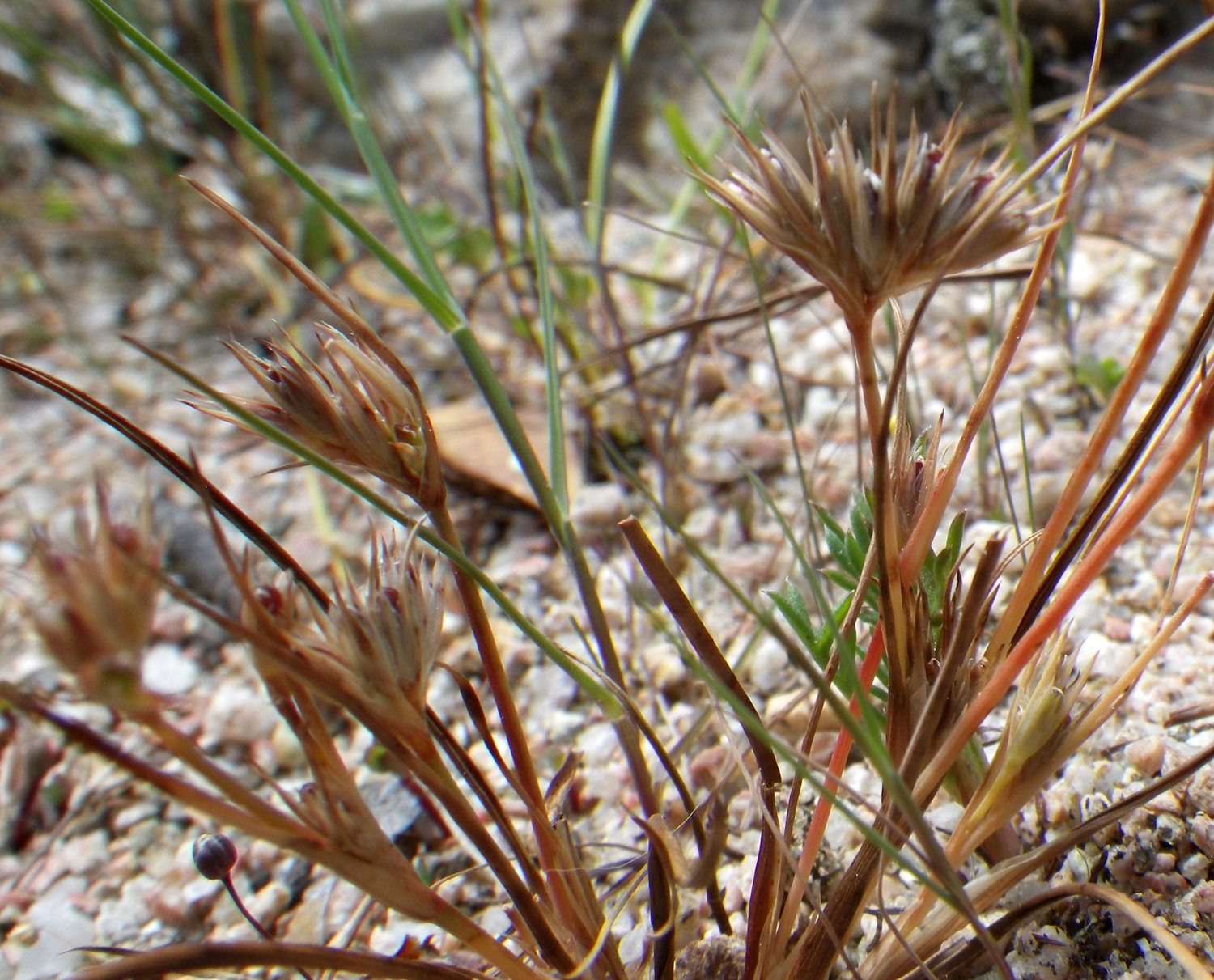

Scientific classification
- Kingdom: Plantae
- Clade: Tracheophytes
- Clade: Angiosperms
- Clade: Monocots
- Clade: Commelinids
- Order: Poales
- Family: Juncaceae
- Genus: Juncus
- Species: J. hybridus

Binomial name
- Juncus hybridus Brot.

Synonyms
- Juncus bufonius subsp. hybridus

= Juncus hybridus =

Species of plant

Juncus hybridus is a species of annual herb in the family Juncaceae (rushes). They have a self-supporting growth form and have simple, broad leaves.

== Sources ==
This article incorporates text from a free content work. Licensed under CC0 (license statement/permission). Text taken from Juncus hybridus. Encyclopedia of Life.
