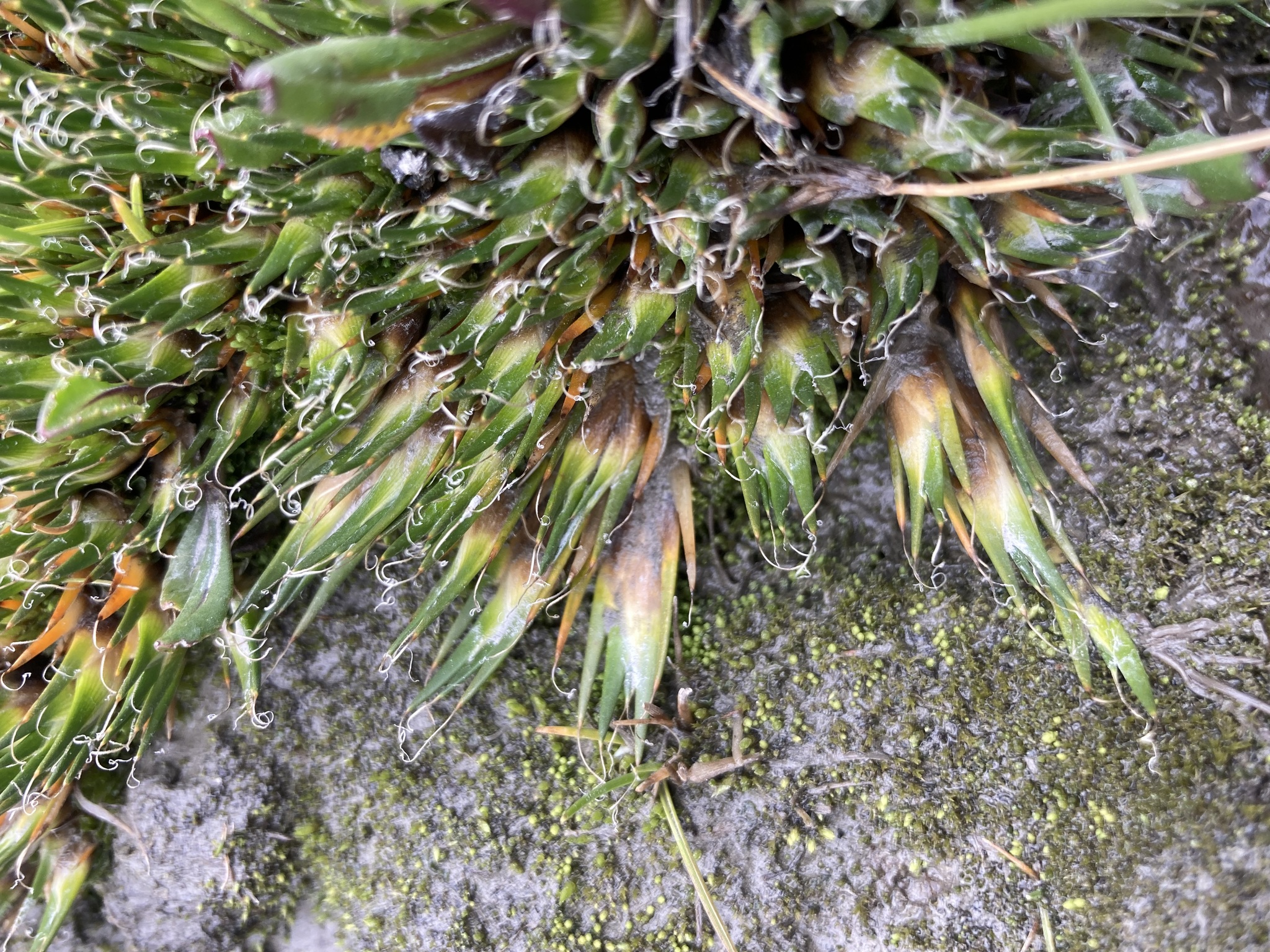
- D. filamentosa

Scientific classification
- Kingdom: Plantae
- Clade: Tracheophytes
- Clade: Angiosperms
- Clade: Monocots
- Clade: Commelinids
- Order: Poales
- Family: Juncaceae
- Genus: Distichia; Nees & Meyen 1843, not Brid. 1827 (Neckeraceae, a bryophyte; illegitimate superfluous name)

Type species
- Distichia muscoides Nees & Meyen.

Synonyms
- Goudotia Decne.; Agapatea Steud., not validly published; Agapatea Steud. ex Buchenau, not validly published

= Distichia (plant) =

Genus of plants

Distichia is a genus of plants in the family Juncaceae described as a genus in 1843.

The genus is native to South America.

species

- Distichia acicularis Balslev & Laegaard - Ecuador
- Distichia filamentosa Buchenau - Peru, Bolivia, N Chile
- Distichia muscoides Nees & Meyen - Colombia, Ecuador, Peru, Bolivia, NW Argentina
