= Philipp Friedrich Theodor Meckel =

German anatomist, surgeon and obstetrician (1755–1803)

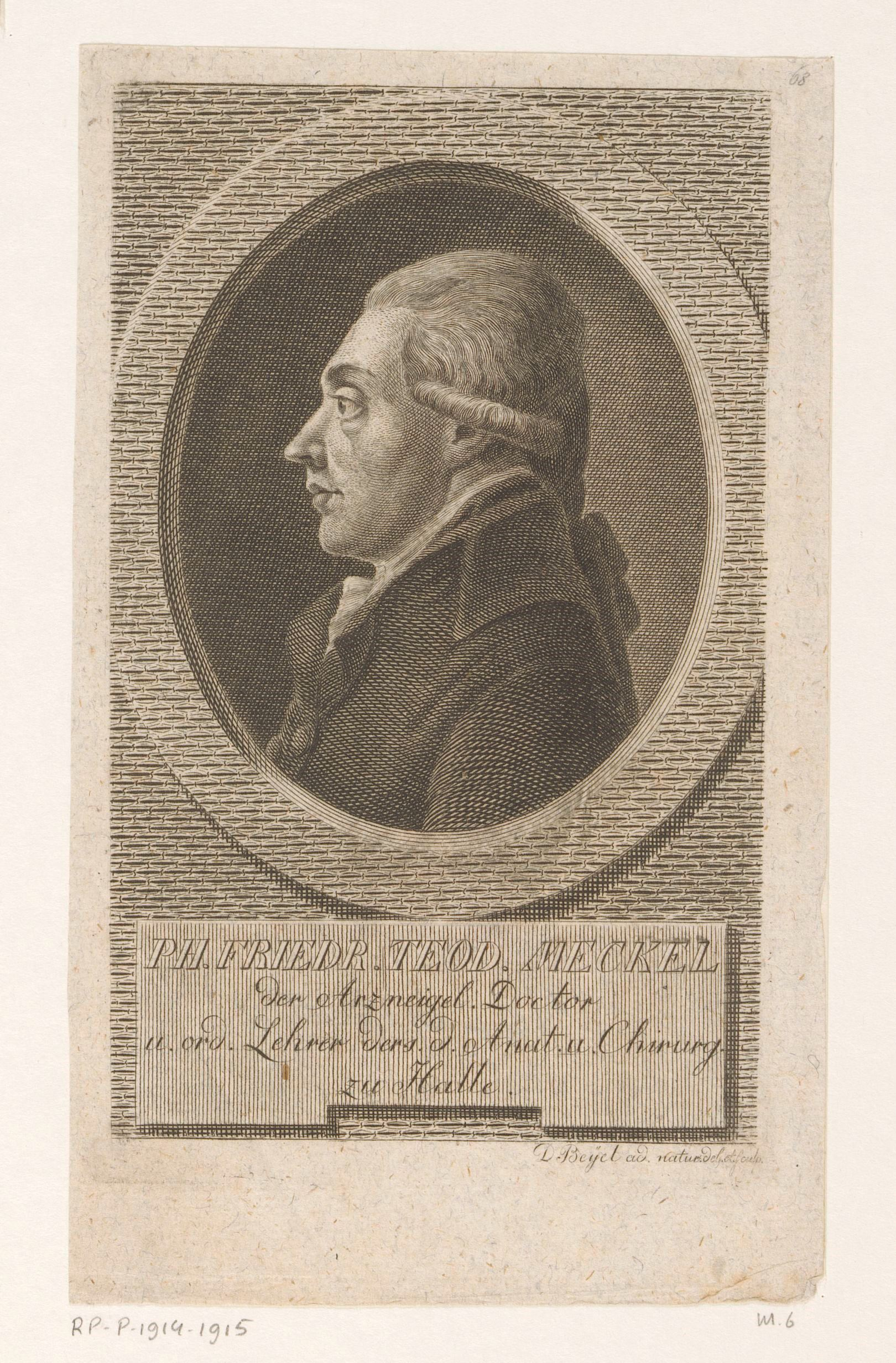
Philipp Friedrich Theodor Meckel

Philipp Friedrich Theodor Meckel (30 April 1755 – 17 March 1803) was a German anatomist, surgeon and obstetrician.

He was born in Berlin, the son of Johann Friedrich Meckel, a professor of anatomy. Two of Philipp's sons also became anatomists, Johann Friedrich (1781–1833), a professor at the University of Halle, and August Albrecht (1790-1829), a professor in Bern.

He studied medicine at the universities of Göttingen and Strasbourg, receiving his doctorate in 1777 with a dissertation on the labyrinth of the inner ear. Following graduation he took an extended study trip to Paris, London and Edinburgh. From 1779 he served as a professor of anatomy and surgery at the University of Halle, and in 1788 took on additional duties as head of the surgical unit at the hospital in Glaucha. On two separate occasions (1795, 1797) he was summoned as an obstetrician to St. Petersburg by the Russian royal family.

At Halle an der Saale, he maintained and expanded upon an anatomical collection ("Meckelsche Sammlungen") that was initiated by his father. He died at Halle.

== Selected works ==
In 1782/83 he published a translation of Jean-Louis Baudelocque's work on childbirth as "Anleitung zur Entbindungskunst" (2 volumes). Other works associated with Meckel are:

- "Dissertatio anatomico-physiologica de labyrinthi auris contentis" (graduate thesis, 1777).
- "Dissertatio inauguralis medica de cognoscendo et curando diabete" (respondent, Karl Friedrich Creuzwieser), 1794.
- "Monographia generis iunci" (with Friedrich Wilhelm Gottlieb Rostkovius), 1801.
- "Dissertatio inauguralis medica, quae dolorem membri amputati remanentem explicat" (A. Lemos, respondent), later translated into English as: "The phantom limb; an 18th century Latin dissertation" (Latin and English text on alternate pages), 1972.
- "Anatomie und anatomische Sammlungen im 18. Jahrhundert : anlässlich der 250. Wiederkehr des Geburtstages von Philipp Friedrich Theodor Meckel (1755-1803)", by Rüdiger Schultka, Josef N. Neumann and Susanne Weidemann – Anatomy and anatomical collections in the 18th century: on the occasion of the 250th anniversary of the birth of Philipp Friedrich Theodor Meckel (1755-1803).
