= Juncus sorrentinoi =

Conservation status
- Vulnerable (IUCN 3.1)

Scientific classification
- Kingdom: Plantae
- Clade: Tracheophytes
- Clade: Angiosperms
- Clade: Monocots
- Clade: Commelinids
- Order: Poales
- Family: Juncaceae
- Genus: Juncus
- Species: J. sorrentinoi

Binomial name
- Juncus sorrentinoi Parl.

Synonyms
- Juncus bufonius var. condensatus Cout.; Juncus bufonius var. sorrentinii (Parl.) Husn.; Juncus sorrentinii var. bicephalus Lojac.

Species of plant

Juncus sorrentinoi is a species of plant in the family Juncaceae (rushes), with a Mediterranean distribution, and introduced to Madeira. It is listed as Vulnerable by the IUCN.
