= Littre hernia =

Medical condition

A Littre hernia is a very rare type of hernia which occurs when a Meckel's diverticulum protrudes through a defect in the abdominal wall. It is named after French physician Alexis de Littre.

This hernia may occur in a number of anatomical locations, typically in the inguinal region (50%), umbilicus (20%) or femoral canal (20%). More recently, this type of hernia has been reported for the first time by Australian surgeon Dr Sarofim in a parastomal location.

Symptoms include pain and swelling at the site of protrusion, but may progress into bowel strangulation, necrosis or perforation. Treatment is repair of the hernia (usually reinforced with mesh) and surgical excision of the Meckel's diverticulum.
