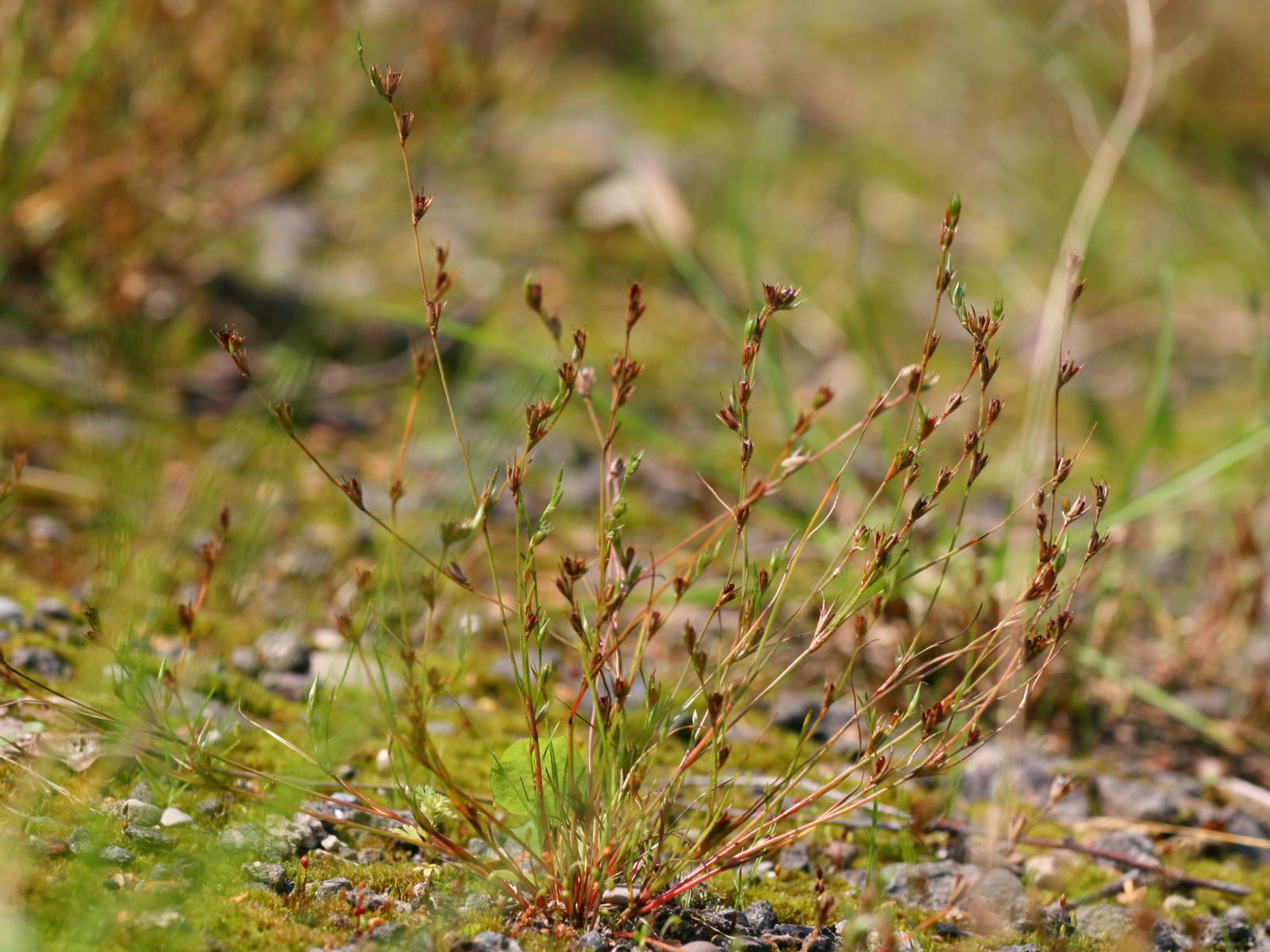

Scientific classification
- Kingdom: Plantae
- Clade: Tracheophytes
- Clade: Angiosperms
- Clade: Monocots
- Clade: Commelinids
- Order: Poales
- Family: Juncaceae
- Genus: Juncus
- Species: J. ranarius

Binomial name
- Juncus ranarius Songeon & E.P.Perrier

Synonyms
- Juncus nastanthus V.I.Krecz. & Gontsch.

= Juncus ranarius =

Species of rush

Juncus ranarius is a species of flowering plant belonging to the rush family Juncaceae.

Its native range is Greenland, Subarctic and Temperate Eurasia, Northwestern Africa.
