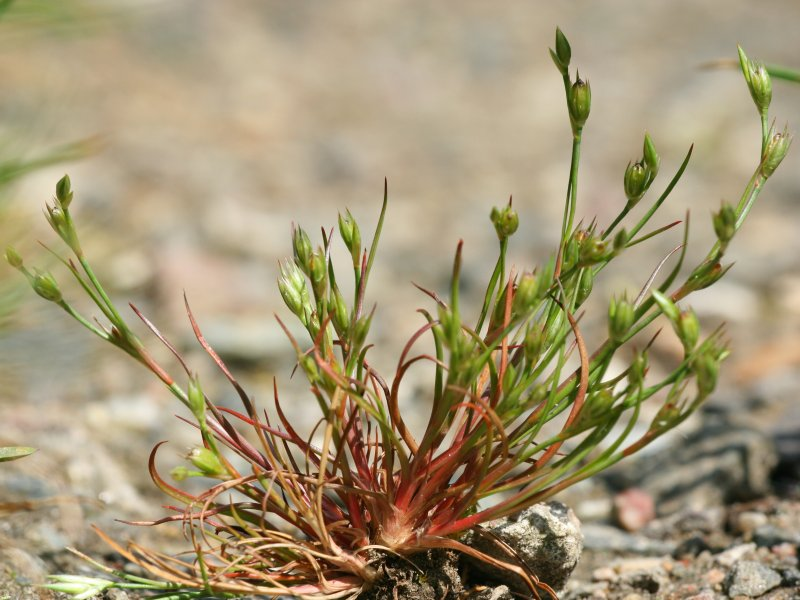

Scientific classification
- Kingdom: Plantae
- Clade: Tracheophytes
- Clade: Angiosperms
- Clade: Monocots
- Clade: Commelinids
- Order: Poales
- Family: Juncaceae
- Genus: Juncus
- Species: J. bufonius

Binomial name
- Juncus bufonius L.

= Juncus bufonius =

Species of grass

Juncus bufonius, known commonly as toad rush, is a widespread flowering plant species complex in the rush family Juncaceae.

== Distribution ==
Its native range is circumpolar throughout tropical, subtropical, subarctic, and temperate climate areas of the Northern Hemisphere and Southern Hemisphere. It is also widely distributed as an introduced species in suitable habitats worldwide. It grows in moist and muddy places, often in wetlands and riparian areas.

In habitats where it is not native and has naturalized it may be considered a weed. The relationship of North America plants to the Eurasian Juncus ranarius is weakly delineated.

== Description ==
Juncus bufonius is an annual monocot that is quite variable in appearance. It is generally a green clumping grasslike rush, with many thin stems wrapped with few threadlike leaves.

The flowers are borne in inflorescences and also in the joint where the inflorescence branches off of the stem. It is a grassy flower folded within tough bracts and sepals. The blooming period is March to May in the Northern Hemisphere and September to November in the Southern Hemisphere.

=== Varieties ===
Varieties include:

- Juncus bufonius var. bufonius — North America.
- Juncus bufonius var. congestus — North America.
- Juncus bufonius var. occidentalis — North America.
- Juncus bufonius var. rechingeri — South Asia.
