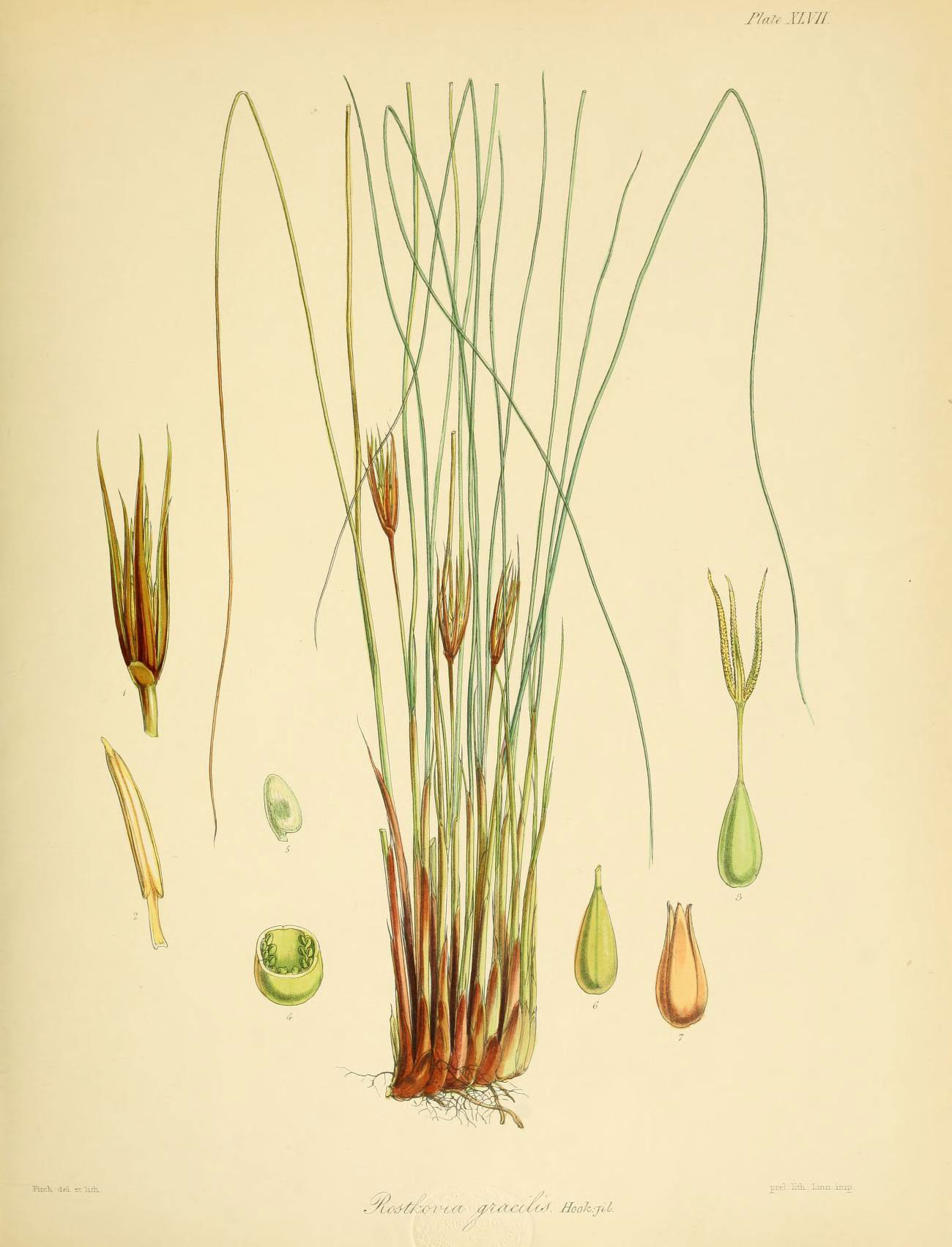
- Plate XLVII (artist Fitch)

Scientific classification
- Kingdom: Plantae
- Clade: Tracheophytes
- Clade: Angiosperms
- Clade: Monocots
- Clade: Commelinids
- Order: Poales
- Family: Juncaceae
- Genus: Juncus
- Species: J. hookeridis

Binomial name
- Juncus hookeridis Steud.

Synonyms
- Juncus gracilis (Hook.f.) Walp.; Marsippospermum gracile (Hook.f.) Buchenau; Marsippospermum gracile var. novae-zelandiae (Buchanan) Buchenau; Rostkovia gracilis Hook.f.; Rostkovia novae-zelandiae Buchanan

= Juncus hookeridis =

Species of flowering plant

Juncus hookeridis (synonym Marsippospermum gracile), common name alpine rush, is a flowering plant species in the rush family Juncaceae which is native to New Zealand.

== Description ==
It is a densely tufted, rhizomatomous plant, whose rhizomes are about 5 mm in diameter and horizontal in plants on the South Island ascending in plants from Auckland and Campbell Is. The stems are 8-40 cm by 0.5 mm., and crowded on the rhizome with reddish brown bracts at their base, the upper conspicuously mucronate. The leaves can be roughly equal in length or much greater in length than the flowering stems. They are slightly less than 1 mm. wide, are terete, rigid, striated, bright green, and shining. The flowers are 1.5–3 cm. long, with an inconspicuous bract. There are six unequal tepals, which are pale brown with membraneous margins. There are six stamens. The leathery capsules are about half the length of tepals, and chestnut-brown. The seeds are about 2.5 mm. long, straw-coloured, and shining.

It flowers from December to February and fruits from January to March.

== Taxonomy ==
The species was first described in 1844 by Joseph Hooker as Rostkovia gracilis. The specific epithet gracilis/gracile comes from the Latin, gracilis, meaning "slender, thin, graceful". In 1855 Ernst Gottlieb von Steudel placed the species in genus Juncus; since several species had already been given the name Juncus gracilis, Steudel renamed the species Juncus hookeridis in honor of Hooker. In 1879 the German botanist Franz Georg Philipp Buchenau assigned the species to genus Marsippospermum as Marsippospermum gracile. As Marsippospermum is now considered a synonym of Juncus, J. hookeridis is the accepted name.

== Conservation status ==
In both 2009 and 2012 it was deemed to be "Not Threatened" under the New Zealand Threat Classification System, and this classification was reaffirmed in 2018.
