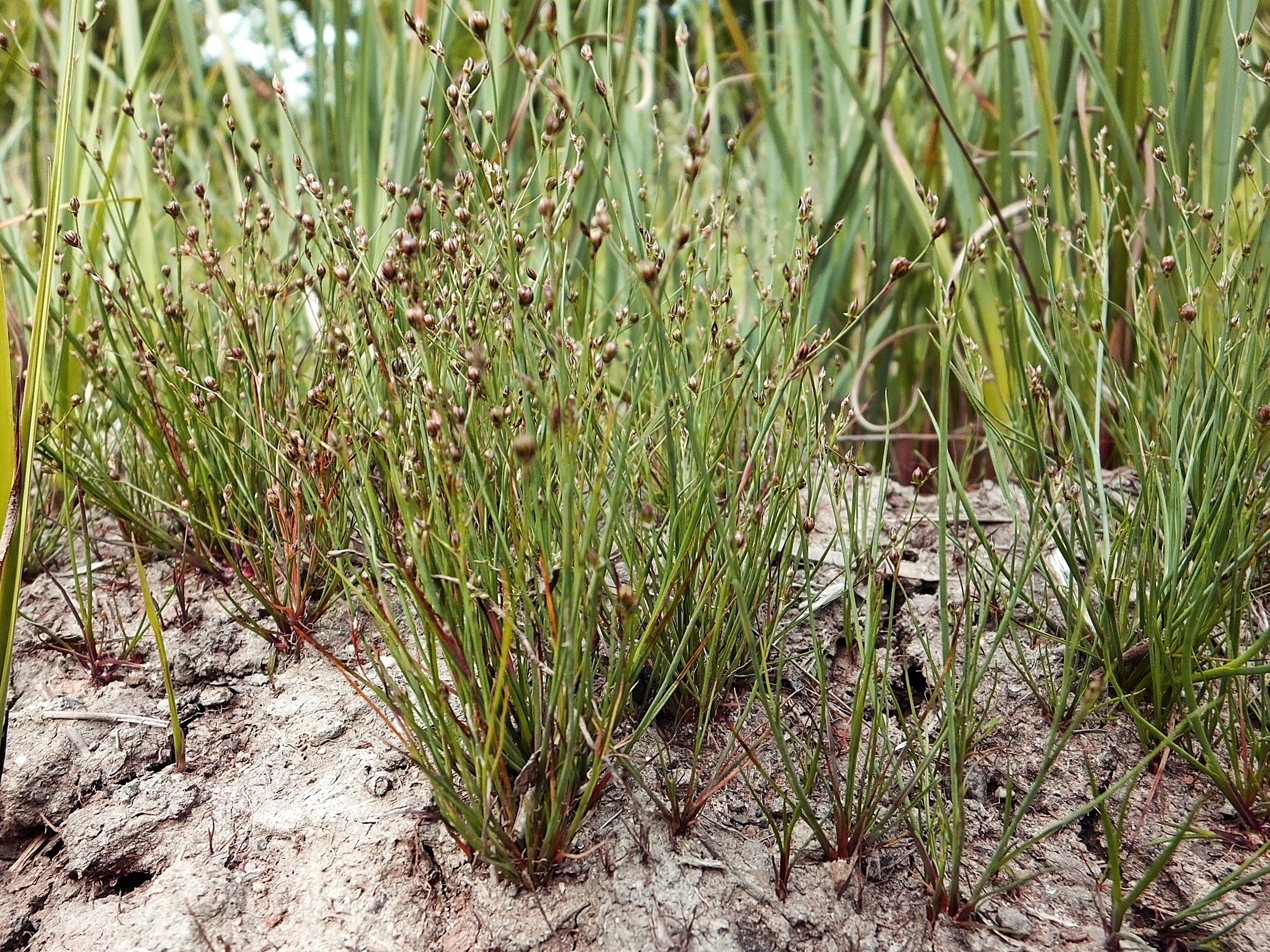
- Habit
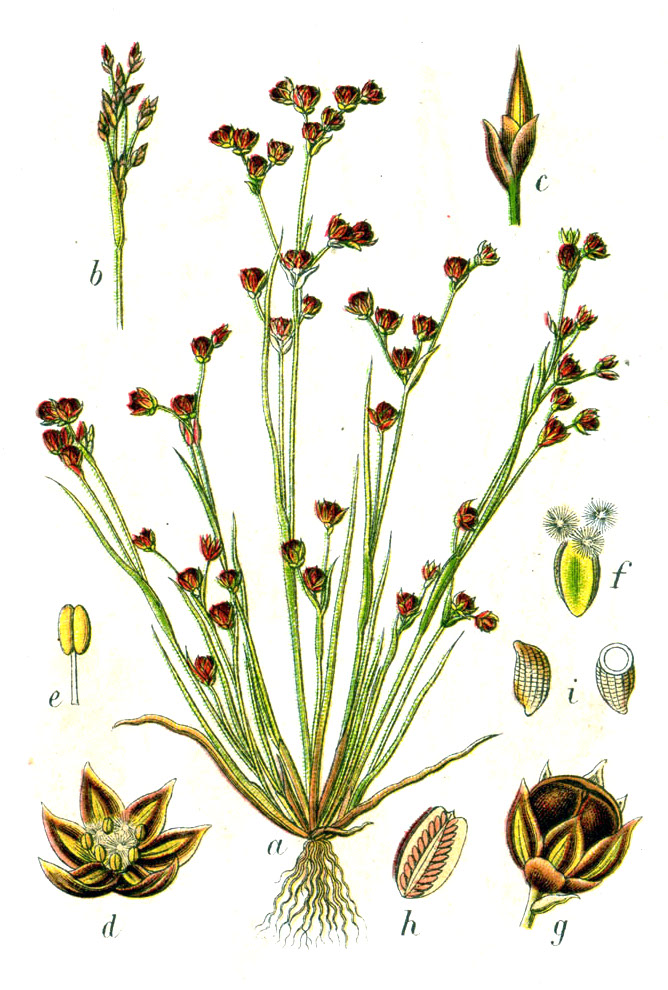
- Botanical illustration

Scientific classification
- Kingdom: Plantae
- Clade: Embryophytes
- Clade: Tracheophytes
- Clade: Spermatophytes
- Clade: Angiosperms
- Clade: Monocots
- Clade: Commelinids
- Order: Poales
- Family: Juncaceae
- Genus: Juncus
- Species: J. tenageia

Binomial name
- Juncus tenageia Ehrh. ex L.f.

Synonyms
- List: Juncus gracilis Lej.; Juncus perpusillus (Fern.-Carv. & F.Navarro) Rivas Mart., Fern.Gonz. & Sánchez Mata; Juncus tenageia var. minutus Esteve & Prieto; Juncus vaillantii Thuill.; Tenageia vaillantii (Thuill.) Rchb.

= Juncus tenageia =

Species of flowering plant

Juncus tenageia, called the sand rush, is a species of flowering plant in the genus Juncus, native to northwestern Africa, many of the Mediterranean islands, warmer parts of southern, central and eastern Europe, and western Asia including Turkey, the Caucasus region, and Kazakhstan. It is typically found growing in wet, nutrient-poor rock, sand or clay-based soils, often in clay pits, old brickyards, and on the edges of roads.

== Subtaxa ==
The following subspecies are currently accepted:

- Juncus tenageia subsp. perpusillus Fern.-Carv. & F.Navarro – A dwarfed version found in Morocco and the Iberian Peninsula
- Juncus tenageia subsp. tenageia
