= Johann Friedrich Meckel =

German anatomist (1781–1833)

Johann Friedrich Meckel ForMemRS
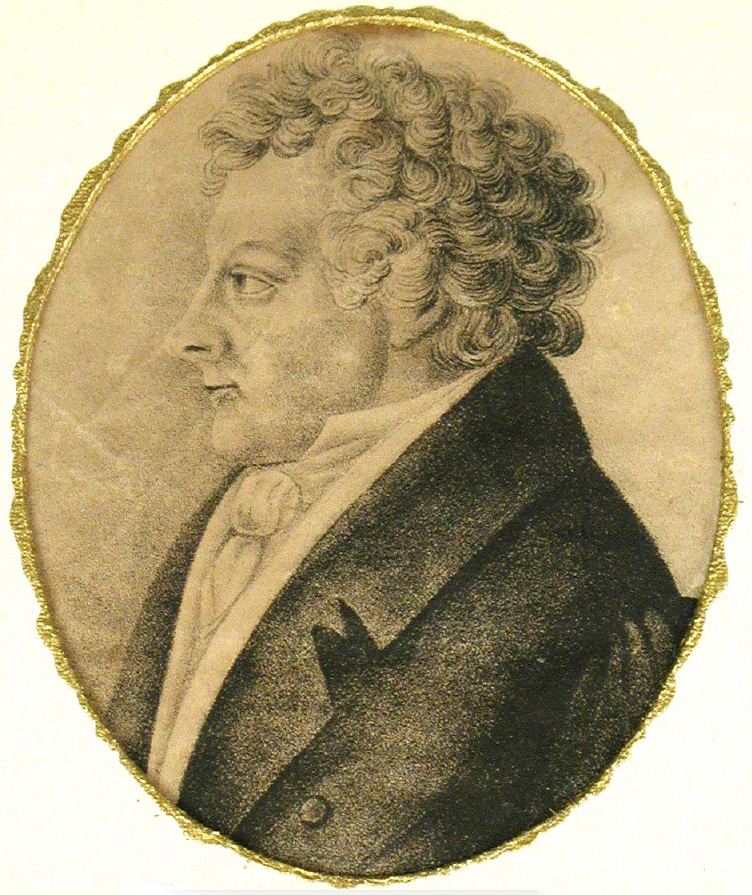
- Johann Friedrich Meckel the Younger
- Born: 17 October 1781; Halle, Holy Roman Empire of the German Nation
- Died: 31 October 1833 (aged 52)
- Education: University of Halle
- Known for: teratology
- Scientific career
- Fields: anatomy, pathology
- Workplaces: University of Halle

Johann Friedrich Meckel (17 October 1781 – 31 October 1833), often referred to as Johann Friedrich Meckel, the Younger, was a German anatomist born in Halle. He worked as a professor of anatomy, pathology and zoology at the University of Halle, Germany.

== Life and research ==
In 1802, he received his medical doctorate from the University of Halle, defending his doctoral thesis De cordis conditionibus abnormibus on 8 April 1802. At Halle he had as instructors, Kurt Sprengel (1766-1833) and Johann Christian Reil (1759-1813). After graduation, Meckel continued his education in Würzburg, Vienna and Paris. In Paris, he assisted zoologist Georges Cuvier (1769–1832) with systematic analysis of anatomical and zootomical specimens. In 1810 he finished translating Cuvier's five-volume Leçons d’anatomie comparée from French into German.

In 1808, he became a full professor of normal and pathological anatomy, surgery and obstetrics at the University of Halle, replacing Justus Christian Loder (1753-1832). From 1826 to 1833, he was editor of the Archiv für Anatomie und Physiologie. In 1829, he was elected a foreign member of the Royal Swedish Academy of Sciences.

Meckel adopted naturalist Jean-Baptiste Lamarck's (1744–1829) evolutionary beliefs. He was a pioneer in the science of teratology, in particular the study of birth defects and abnormalities that occur during embryonic development. He believed that abnormal development adhered to the same natural laws as did normal development. With French embryologist Étienne Serres (1786–1868), the "Meckel-Serres Law" is named, defined as a theory of parallelism between the stages of ontogeny and the stages of a unifying pattern in the organic world ("scala naturae").

== Associated terms ==
The following eponymous terms are named after him:

- Meckel's diverticulum – an out-pouching of the ileum, part of the small intestine, and found in approximately 2% of the population.
- Meckel's cartilage – A cartilaginous bar from which the mandible is formed. Described in 1820.
- A syndrome – Meckel-Gruber syndrome – is also named after him.
- A protein – mecklin – the gene for which is found on chromosome 8 (8q21.3-q22.1) is named after him.
- The supposed Meckel-Serres Law of recapitulation in embryology.

== Family ==
His grandfather was also named "Johann Friedrich Meckel". In order to avoid confusion, he is often referred to as Johann Friedrich Meckel, the Elder. The elder Meckel was also a professor of anatomy, and he too has anatomical structures named after him.

His father, Philipp Friedrich Theodor Meckel (1755–1803), was also an anatomist.

His brother, August Albrecht Meckel (1789–1829), practiced legal medicine and investigated avian anatomy but died prematurely from tuberculosis.

August's son – Johann Heinrich Meckel (1821–1856) – was the professor of pathologic anatomy at the University of Berlin that his great-grandfather had held at the Charité. After his death also from pulmonary disease, his position was filled by Rudolf Virchow.

== See also ==
- Meckel syndrome
- Meckel diverticulum
