= Alexis Littré =

French physician and anatomist (1654–1726)

Alexis Littre (17 July 1654 – 3 February 1726) was a French physician and anatomist born in Cordes (currently Cordes-Tolosannes), in the province of Quercy.

== Biography ==
Littre studied medicine in Montpellier and Paris, receiving his doctorate in 1691. In 1699 he became a member of the Académie des Sciences.

In Paris, he taught anatomy and was the author of numerous medical publications. He was the first to give a description of a hernial protrusion of an intestinal diverticulum. This condition is now referred to as "Littre's hernia".

He also described the mucous urethral glands of the male urethra. These structures were to become known as "Littre's glands", and their inflammation is sometimes called "littreitis".

In his 1710 treatise Diverses observations anatomiques, Littre was the first to suggest the possibility of performing a lumbar colostomy for an obstruction of the colon.

Jean Louis Petit was one of his students. So was Jacques-Bénigne Winslow in 1707. He died in Paris.
