= Johann Friedrich Meckel, the Elder =

German anatomist (1724–1774)

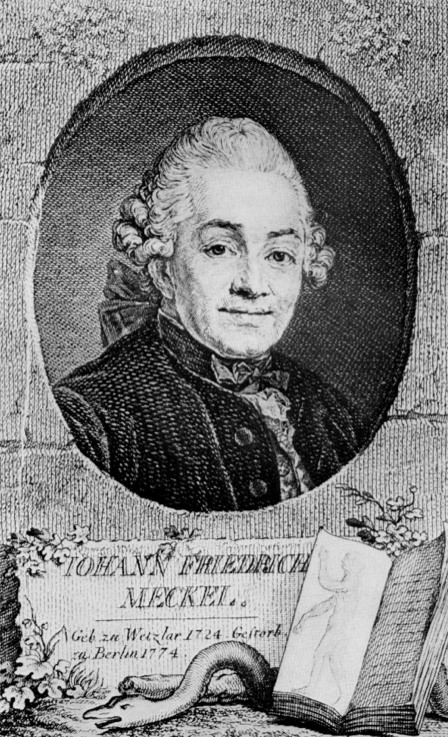
- Johann Friedrich Meckel, the Elder
- Born: 31 July 1724; Wetzlar
- Died: 18 September 1774 (aged 50)
- Education: University of Göttingen
- Known for: submandibular ganglion

Johann Friedrich Meckel the Elder (31 July 1724 – 18 September 1774) was a German anatomist born in Wetzlar. He often has "the Elder" appended to his name to avoid confusion with his famous grandson Johann Friedrich Meckel (1781–1833), who was also an anatomist and often has "the Younger" included with his name. The elder Meckel's son, Philipp Friedrich Theodor Meckel (1755–1803) and another grandson, August Albrecht Meckel (1790–1829) were also anatomists.

Meckel earned his medical doctorate from the University of Göttingen in 1748, and in his thesis, "Tractatus anatomico physiologicus de quinto pare nervorum cerebri", he documented his discovery of the submandibular ganglion. Subsequently, he moved to Berlin, where he worked as a prosector and taught classes on midwifery. In 1751 he became a professor of anatomy, botany and obstetrics.

In 1773, Meckel was elected a foreign member of the Royal Swedish Academy of Sciences.

== Eponyms ==
Meckel has a number of anatomical eponyms associated with him:

- Meckel's space or Meckel's cave: A cavity in the dura mater over the petrous portion of the temporal bone that covers the trigeminal ganglion.
- Meckel's ganglion: better known as the sphenopalatine ganglion, which is a small parasympathetic ganglion in the upper part of the sphenomaxillary fissure giving off nerves to the eyes, nose, and palate.
- Meckel's ligament: a portion of the anterior ligament that fastens the malleus to the wall of the tympanic membrane. This structure may be named after Meckel's son, Philipp Friedrich Theodor Meckel.

Meckel's cave was described by Meckel in his undergraduate dissertation on the trigeminal nerve.

== Collection ==
During his career, Meckel began an anatomical collection that was continued by his son and grandson. The collection includes mummified parts of the body, organs, skeletons and skulls, zoological as well as human anatomy. The collection also contains teratological specimens, including a complete situs inversus from the 18th century. Today the Meckelsche Sammlungen (Meckel Collection) has approximately 7000 exhibits and is housed at the Martin Luther University of Halle-Wittenberg in Halle.
