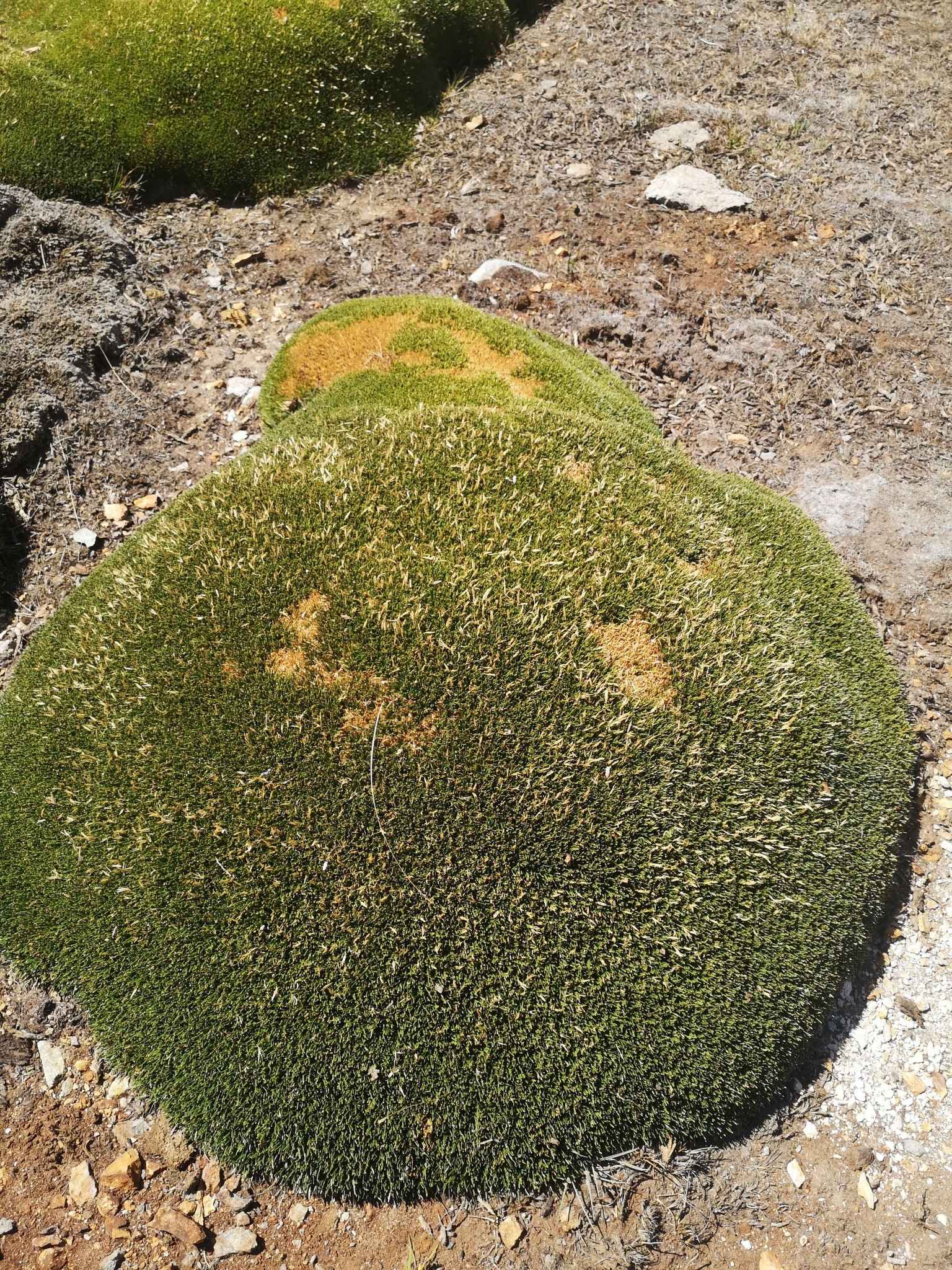

Scientific classification
- Kingdom: Plantae
- Clade: Tracheophytes
- Clade: Angiosperms
- Clade: Monocots
- Clade: Commelinids
- Order: Poales
- Family: Juncaceae
- Genus: Patosia; Buchenau
- Species: P. clandestina

Binomial name
- Patosia clandestina (Phil.) Buchenau

Synonyms
- Rostkovia clandestina Phil.; Distichia clandestina (Buchenau) Buchenau; Oxychloe clandestina (Buchenau) Hauman; Rostkovia brevifolia Phil.; Oxychloe brevifolia (Phil.) Buchenau; Distichia brevifolia (Phil.) Phil. ex Benth. & Hook.f.; Patosia tucumanensis Castillón; Patosia clandestina var. tucumanensis (Castillón) Barros

= Patosia =

Genus of grasses

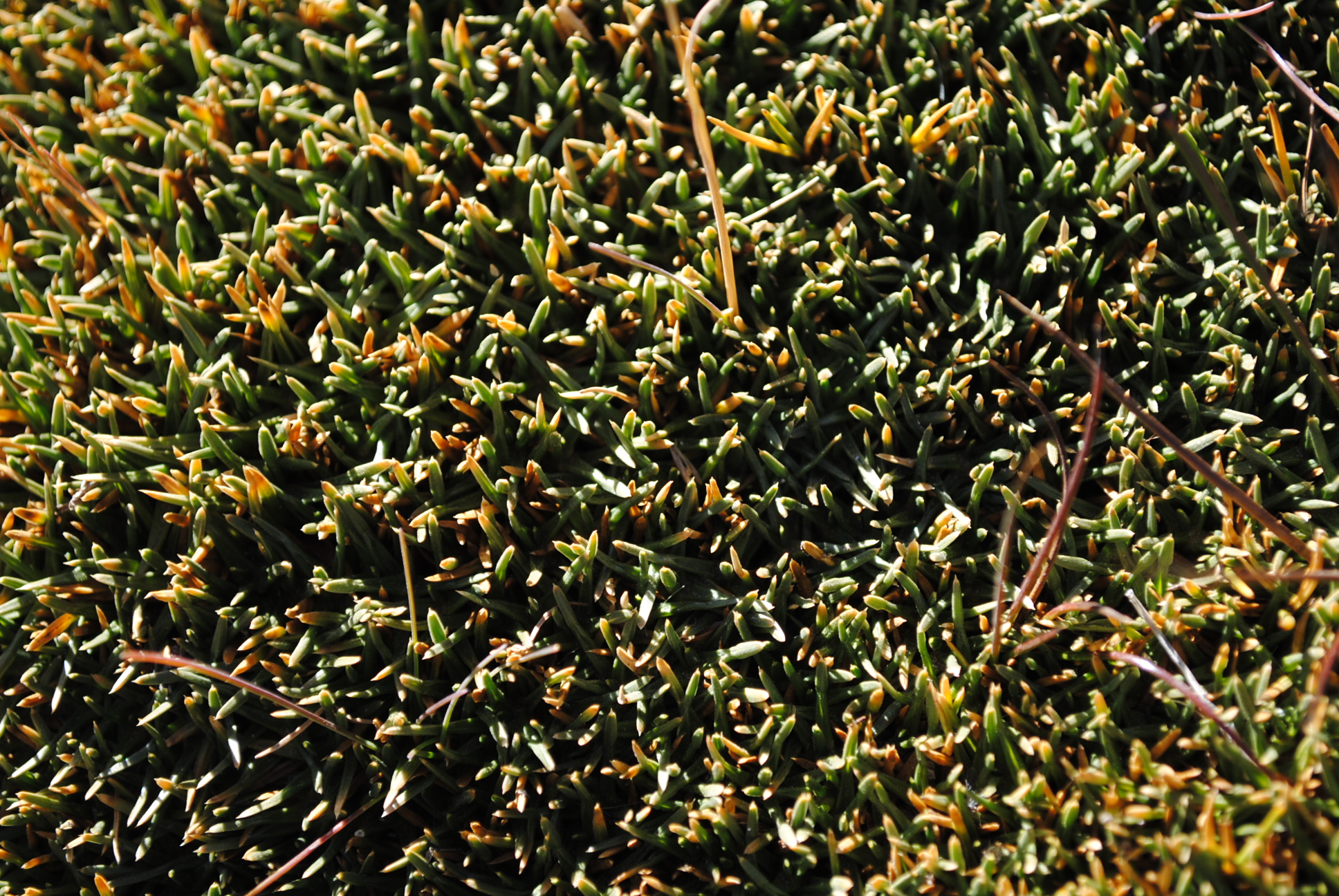
Patosia clandestina

Patosia is a monotypic genus of flowering plants in the family Juncaceae. It was described as a genus in 1890.

The genus contains only one known species, Patosia clandestina, native to southern South America (Chile, Argentina and Bolivia).
