= August Albrecht Meckel =

German anatomist (1790–1829)

August Albrecht Meckel (1790–1829) was a German medical doctor. He was the grandson of Johann Friedrich Meckel the Elder and younger brother of Johann Friedrich Meckel.

== Biography ==
Albrecht Meckel came from an old medical family. His father Philipp Friedrich Theodor Meckel (1755-1803) taught him anatomy and surgery. His grandfather, Johann Friedrich Meckel the Elder (1724-1774), was professor of anatomy and obstetrics in Berlin and surgeon of Empress Catherine the Great.

Meckel studied medicine at the universities of Jena and Halle. In 1807 he joined the Corps Saxonia Jena and 1810 the Corps Guestphalia Halle. During the Napoleonic Wars (1813–14) he served as a volunteer physician in the Armed Forces of the Kingdom of Prussia under General Ludwig Adolf Wilhelm von Lützow (1782-1834).

After a period as a pathologist with his half-brother Johann Friedrich Meckel (the Younger) in Halle, he received a professorship in anatomy and forensic medicine at the University of Bern, a post he held until his death.

Albrecht August Meckel was married to Luise Johanne Wilhelmine Schmelzer (1796-1873), with whom he had three children.

His son Heinrich Meckel von Hemsbach (1821-1856) was also a physician and professor of Pathological Anatomy. He was a pathologist at Charité Berlin AO.

== Works ==
- Einige Gegenstände der gerichtlichen Medicin. Halle 1818.
- Beiträge zur gerichtlichen Psychologie. Halle 1820.
- Lehrbuch der gerichtlichen Medicin. Halle 1821.

== Literature ==
- Eberhard J. Wormer: Meckel von Hemsbach, Johann Friedrich der Jüngere. In: Neue Deutsche Biographie (NDB). Band 16, Duncker & Humblot, Berlin 1990, ISBN 3-428-00197-4, S. 585 f. (Digitalisat). (reference in the article about his brother)
- Nikolaus Rüdinger: Meckel von Hemsbach, Johann Friedrich (Anatom). In: Allgemeine Deutsche Biographie (ADB). Band 21, Duncker & Humblot, Leipzig 1885, S. 159–162. (reference of Albrecht Meckel as a family member)
