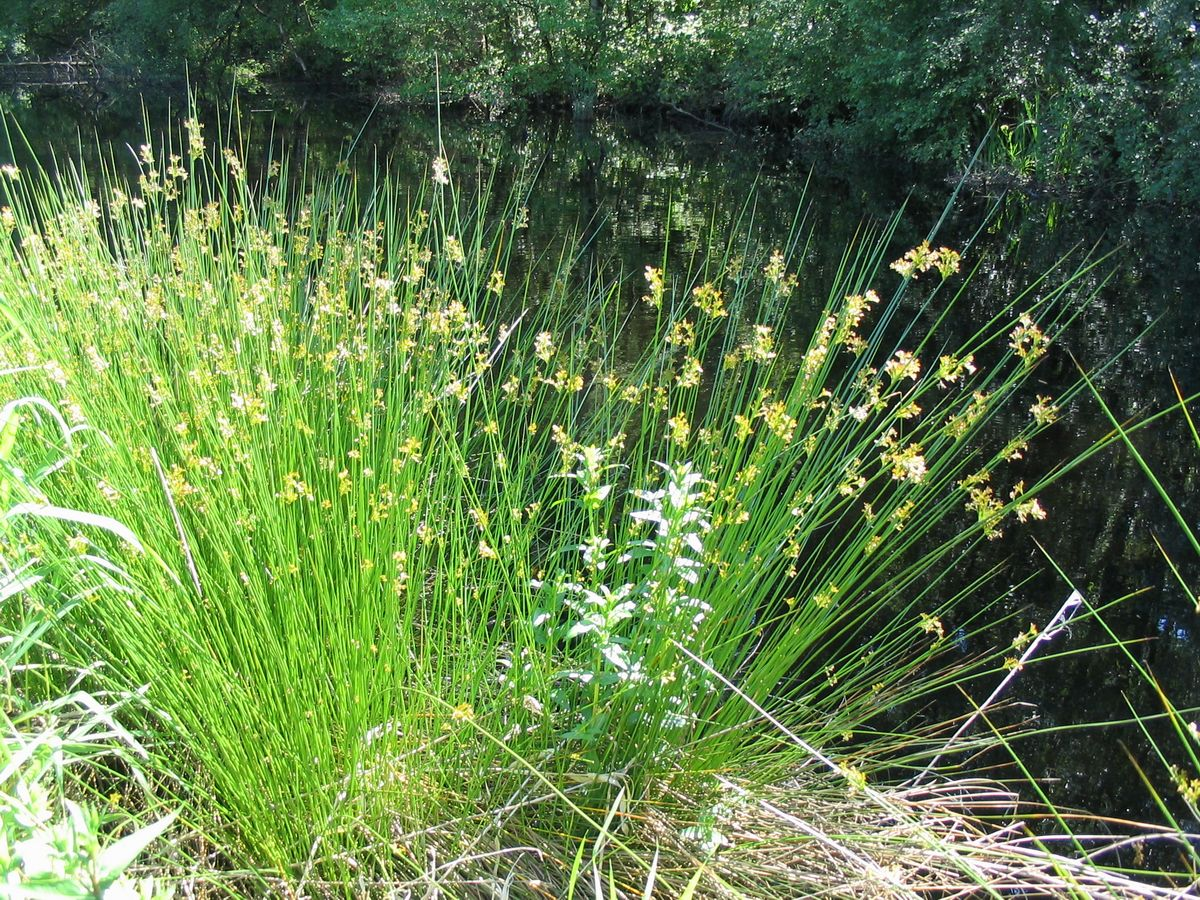
- Juncus effusus

Scientific classification
- Kingdom: Plantae
- Clade: Tracheophytes
- Clade: Angiosperms
- Clade: Monocots
- Clade: Commelinids
- Order: Poales
- Family: Juncaceae; Juss.

Type genus
- Juncus L.

Genera
- Distichia Nees & Meyen; Juncinella Záv.Drábk. & Proćków; Juncus L. (synonyms Marsippospermum Desv. and Rostkovia Desv.) – rush; Luzula DC. – woodrush; Oreojuncus Záv.Drábk. & Kirschner; Oxychloe Phil.; Patosia Buchenau
- Species richness of Juncaceae

Synonyms
- Junceae

= Juncaceae =

Family of flowering plants commonly known as rushes

Juncaceae is a family of flowering plants, commonly known as the rush family. It consists of 7 genera and about 464 known species of slow-growing, rhizomatous, herbaceous monocotyledonous plants that may superficially resemble grasses and sedges. They often grow on infertile soils in a wide range of moisture conditions. The best-known and largest genus is Juncus. Most of the Juncus species grow exclusively in wetland habitats. A few rushes, such as Juncus bufonius are annuals, but most are perennials. Despite the apparent similarity, Juncaceae are not counted among the plants with the vernacular name bulrush.

== Description ==
The leaves are evergreen and well-developed in a basal aggregation on an erect stem. They are alternate and tristichous (i.e., with three rows of leaves up the stem, each row of leaves arising one-third of the way around the stem from the previous leaf). Only in the genus Distichia are the leaves distichous. The rushes of the genus Juncus have flat, hairless leaves or cylindrical leaves. The leaves of the wood-rushes of the genus Luzula are always flat and bear long white hairs.

The plants are monoecious or, rarely, dioecious. The small flowers are arranged in inflorescences of loose cymes, but also in rather dense heads or corymbs at the top of the stem or at its side. This family typically has reduced perianth segments called tepals. These are usually arranged in two whorls, each containing three thin, papery tepals. They are not bright or flashy in appearance, and their color can vary from greenish to whitish, brown, purple, black, or hyaline. The three stigmas are in the center of the flowers. As is characteristic of monocots, all of the flower parts appear in multiples of three.

The fruit is usually a nonfleshy, three-sectioned dehiscent capsule containing many seeds.

== Uses ==
The dried pith of some species of this family with continuous pith is used to make a lighting implement known as a rushlight.

The common rush (Juncus effusus) is called igusa in Japanese and is used to weave the soft surface cover of tatami mats.

In medieval Europe, loose fresh rushes would be strewn on earthen floors in dwellings for cleanliness and insulation. Particularly favored for such a purpose was Acorus calamus (sweet flag), but despite its alternate vernacular name "sweet rush", it is a plant from a different monocot order, Acorales. Up until the 1960s in Ireland, rushes were spread on the earthen floor of homes during wet weather to help keep the floor dry during periods of snow or rain, or during hot weather to keep rooms cool. Rushes used in Ireland included Juncus effusus, Juncus inflexus, and Juncus conglomeratus.

The stems and leaves of Juncus kraussii were used by Indigenous Australians for fibre, for string, fishing lines, woven rugs and woven baskets. It is commonly used today for stabilisation of the banks of estuaries, around salt marshes and riparian zones next to sites developed for human use. It is also used in biofiltration systems and rain gardens.
