= Merlin's grass =

Merlin's grass is a common name for several plants and may refer to:

- Isoetes lacustris
- Isoetes tegetiformans, endemic to the U.S. state of Georgia
