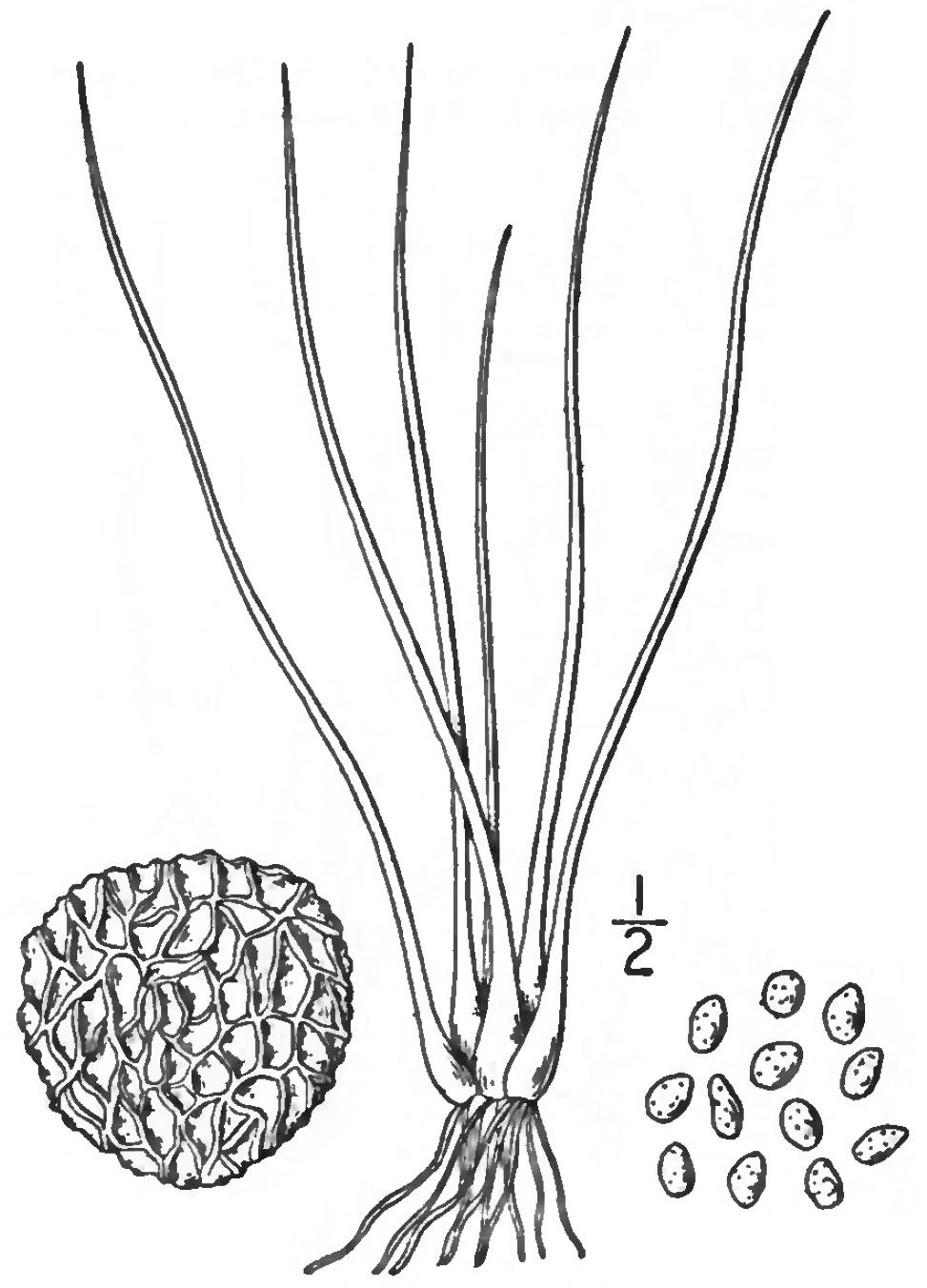

Conservation status
- Least Concern (IUCN 3.1)

Scientific classification
- Kingdom: Plantae
- Clade: Tracheophytes
- Clade: Lycophytes
- Class: Lycopodiopsida
- Order: Isoetales
- Family: Isoetaceae
- Genus: Isoetes
- Species: I. riparia

Binomial name
- Isoetes riparia Engelm. ex A.Braun

Synonyms
- Isoetes braunii f. robusta (Englem.) Reed; Isoetes canadensis (Engelm.) A.A. Eat.; Isoetes echinospora var. robusta Engelm.

= Isoetes riparia =

Eastern North American species of quillwort

Isoetes riparia, the shore quillwort, is a species of plant in the family Isoetaceae. It can be found in rivers, creeks, and tidal mud flats in southern Quebec and southeastern Ontario, south to eastern New York. It has 5 to 35 long, erect bright green to yellow-green leaves, which are 6 to 35 centimeters long. The velum covers one fourth of the sporangium, which can be 7 millimeters long and 4 millimeters wide. The elongated ligule can grow to be 3 millimeters long. The spherical megaspores are 430 to 680 micrometers in diameter with closely set ridges. The kidney-shaped microspores are 24-35 micrometers long, and usually have spine-tipped tubercules. The megaspores can sometimes come to resemble that of either I. echinospora, if the megaspores become eroded and bear projections that could resemble spines, or I. macrospora, if the broken ridges take a certain shape.
