= Isoetes stephanseniae =

Scientific classification
- Kingdom: Plantae
- Clade: Tracheophytes
- Clade: Lycophytes
- Class: Lycopodiopsida
- Order: Isoetales
- Family: Isoetaceae
- Genus: Isoetes
- Species: I. stephanseniae

Binomial name
- Isoetes stephanseniae A.V.Duthie

Synonyms
- Isoetes capensis var. stephanseniae (A.V.Duthie) Schelpe & N.C.Anthony

South African endemic quillwort species

Isoetes stephanseniae, the granite quillwort, is a species of quillwort from South Africa, named for A. J. Stephansen, who discovered it in 1927. Of very limited distribution, it is known to survive only as one population in seasonal pools over granite near Stellenbosch, where it is threatened by the encroachment of alien species and eutrophication from the sewage works on whose grounds it grows. Like other quillworts, it bears a tuft of leaves with distinctively sculpted megaspores. It is most similar to Isoetes capensis, the cape quillwort, which occurs in the same province; both hold their leaves at a 45-degree angle, unlike most South African quillworts which have leaves stiffly erect.

== Description ==
The granite quillwort is a small, somewhat grasslike plant of aquatic habitats. During summer dormancy, it survives as a two-lobed pseudocorm, with blackish-brown, leathery bud scales that are triangular in shape, about 3 millimetres (0.1 in) long and 3 millimetres (0.1 in) wide at the base. They sometimes have a hairlike tip extending them an additional 3 millimetres (0.1 in).

From these buds grow 5 to 15 leaves, which are linear and acicular (needle-like) in shape, ranging from 40 to 130 millimetres (1.6 to 5.1 in) long and about 1.5 millimetres (0.059 in) wide. The leaves are held loosely upright at about a 45-degree angle, similar to I. capensis but unlike the more erect I. stellenbossiensis. The leaves widen at their base to about 4 millimetres (0.2 in) wide to accommodate sporangia, and bear a narrow wing of membranous-textured tissue at their margins there. The ligules at the base of the leaf blades are cordate-triangular in shape, pale in colour, darkening at their base, and up to 1 millimetre (0.04 in) long.

A flap of tissue known as the velum completely covers the opening of the sporangium. The megaspores are 0.45 to 0.62 millimetres (0.018 to 0.024 in) in diameter and gray-white in colour. The two surfaces of the megaspore vary in appearance; the proximal surface has a few scattered warts, which become more abundant on the distal surface, where the markings become reticulate as adjacent warts condense into ridges.

While several other species of South African Isoetes also have reticulate megaspores, I. stellenbossiensis and I. wormaldii have much more uniform ridges and smaller areoles between them than those of I. stephanseniae. The megaspores of I. capensis can be fairly similar, but that species has a three-lobed (rather than a two-lobed) pseudocorm.

== Taxonomy ==
The species was first described by Augusta Vera Duthie in 1929, based on material discovered by Miss A. J. Stephansen, for whom it was named. It was reduced to a variety of Isoetes capensis as Isoetes capensis var. stephanseniae in 1985, but more recent treatments have continued to regard it as a species.

== Distribution and habitat ==
The granite quillwort is endemic to the Stellenbosch area of the Western Cape of South Africa. The Stellenbosch Flats, where it occurs on seasonally wet ground, have been very much urbanized since its discovery. Of the two populations known, one was destroyed by the expansion of Stellenbosch University; the remaining one is protected on the grounds of the local sewerage works. It grows in vernal pools over granite and in the surrounding marshy grassland.

== Ecology ==
During the summer, the pools and marshlands where the species occurs dry up, and it becomes dormant, with the pseudocorm waiting until the first rain to put up new leaves. It occupies sites that are wetter and hold water longer than I. stellenbossiensis, which also occurs on the Stellenbosch Flats.

== Conservation ==
This species is considered to be critically endangered by the South African National Biodiversity Institute. The single currently known population is threatened by eutrophication from the adjacent sewage farm and competition from alien plant species.

== Notes and references ==
=== Works cited ===
- Crouch, Neil R; Klopper, Ronell R; Burrows, John E; Burrows, Sandra M (2011). Ferns of Southern Africa. Cape Town, South Africa: Struik Nature. ISBN 978-1-77007-910-6.
- Duthie, A. V. (1929). "The Species of Isoetes Found in the Union of South Africa". Transactions of the Royal Society of South Africa. 17 (4): 321–332. doi:10.1080/00359192909518784. ISSN 0035-919X.
- Hassler, Michael (22 September 2023), "Isoetes", World Ferns. Synonymic Checklist and Distribution of Ferns and Lycophytes of the World, 16.4
- Roux, J.P; Raimondo, D. (2006). "Isoetes stephanseniae A.V.Duthie. National Assessment: Red List of South African Plants version 2020.1". SANBI Red List of South African Plants.
- Anthony, Nicola C.; Schelpe, E. A. (1985). "Two new taxa and a new combination in Southern African Pteridophyta". Bothalia. 15 (3–4): 554–555. doi:10.4102/abc.v15i3/4.1847.
