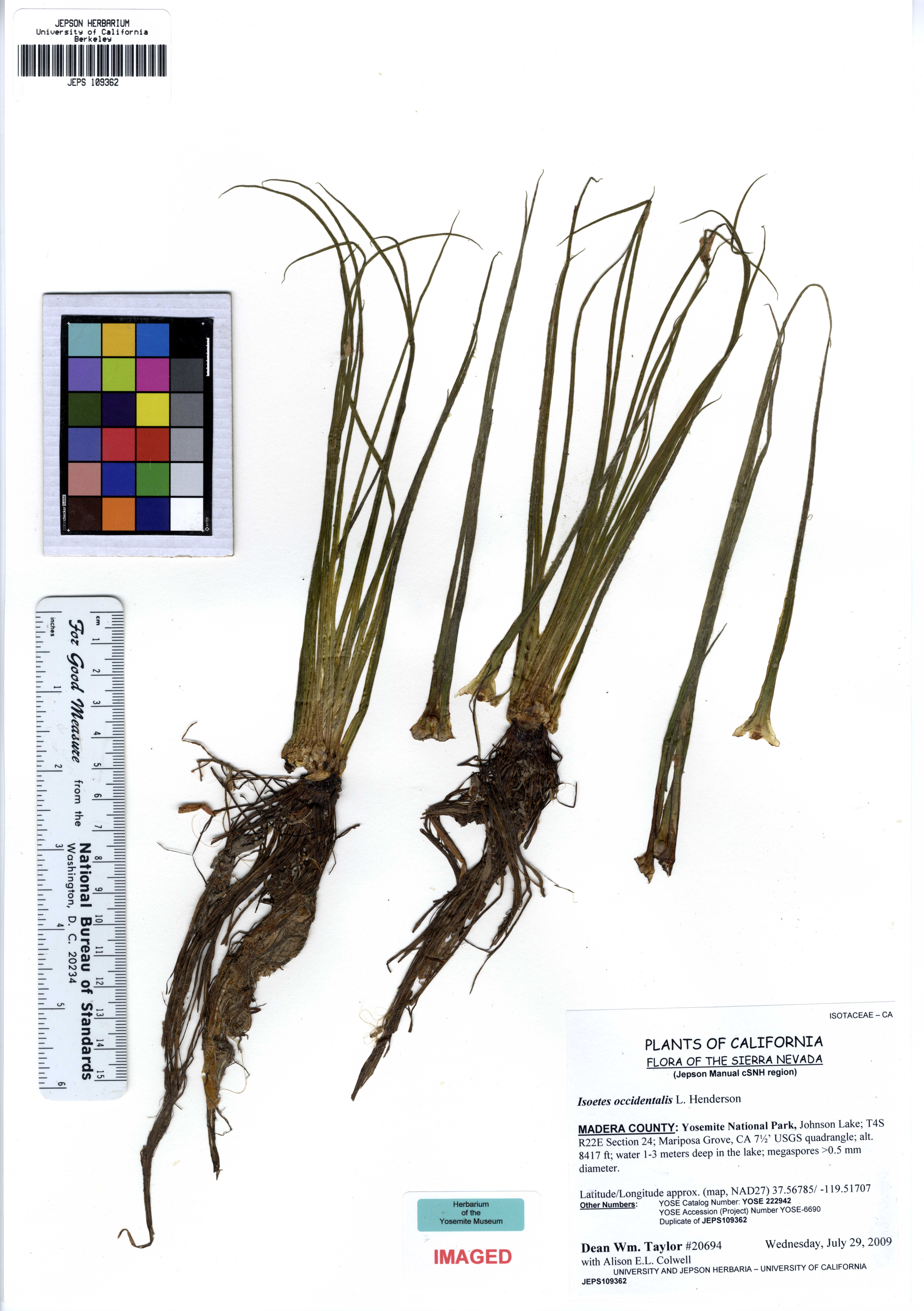

Conservation status
- Apparently Secure (NatureServe)

Scientific classification
- Kingdom: Plantae
- Clade: Tracheophytes
- Clade: Lycophytes
- Class: Lycopodiopsida
- Order: Isoetales
- Family: Isoetaceae
- Genus: Isoetes
- Species: I. occidentalis

Binomial name
- Isoetes occidentalis Henderson

Synonyms
- Isoetes lacustris var. paupercula Engelm.; Isoetes paupercula (Engelm.) A.A. Eat.; Isoetes piperi A.A. Eat.; Isoetes flettii (A.A.Eat.) Pfeiffer

= Isoetes occidentalis =

Western North American species of quillwort

Isoetes occidentalis, the western quillwort, is a species of quillwort in the family Isoetaceae. It can be found in aquatic habitats of coastal Alaska and British Columbia south to California and Colorado. It is frequently found on Vancouver Island and around the Fraser Valley region. It bears 10 to 30 or more rigid, dark green leaves, each 5 to 20 centimeters long. The velum covers one fourth to one third of the orbicular sporangium, which is 5 to 6 millimeters in diameter. The ligule is shaped like a shortened triangle. The white megaspores are 500 to 700 micrometers in diameter and bear sharp ridges and crests. The microspores are 36 to 43 micrometers long. Though the leaves seem to bear resemblance to those of I. lacustris, especially the occasionally occurring reddish base, I. occidentalis is a hexaploid and I. lacustris is a decaploid.
