= Isoetes acadiensis =

Scientific classification
- Kingdom: Plantae
- Clade: Tracheophytes
- Clade: Lycophytes
- Class: Lycopodiopsida
- Order: Isoetales
- Family: Isoetaceae
- Genus: Isoetes
- Species: I. acadiensis

Binomial name
- Isoetes acadiensis Kott

North American species of quillwort

Isoetes acadiensis, the Acadian quillwort is a species of quillwort in the Isoetaceae family described by Kott in 1981. It can be found along the shores of lakes, ponds, and rivers in Newfoundland, Nova Scotia, and New Brunswick, as well as in the American states Maine, Massachusetts, and New Hampshire. It has a similar distribution to that of I. tuckermanii. It bears 9 to 35 mostly recurved leaves, each 5–21 cm long. The leaves are usually dark green, though can occasionally be tinged with red. The sporangium can be up to five millimeters long and 3 millimeters in length, covered one sixth to one third by the velum. The spherical megaspores are 400-570 micrometers in diameter, and bear smooth ridges. The kidney shaped microspores are 25 to 30 micrometers long. It was originally believed to be a member of Isoetes hieroglyphica because of their similar megaspore structure.
