= Isoetes howellii =

Conservation status
- Apparently Secure (NatureServe)

Scientific classification
- Kingdom: Plantae
- Clade: Tracheophytes
- Clade: Lycophytes
- Class: Lycopodiopsida
- Order: Isoetales
- Family: Isoetaceae
- Genus: Isoetes
- Species: I. howellii

Binomial name
- Isoetes howellii Engelm.

Synonyms
- Isoetes melanopoda Gay & Dur. var. californica A.A. Eat.

North American species of quillwort

Isoetes howellii, or Howell's quillwort, is a species of quillwort, a type of lycophyte. It is an aquatic plant native to North America.

== Distribution ==
Isotes howelii is found in western North America and grows in wet habitats such as vernal pools.

== Description ==
It produces 5 to 28 pointed, cylindrical, bright green leaves that can reach 30 centimeters in length. The velum covers roughly one third of the spherical sporangia, which is 6 millimeters long. The ligule is in the shape of an elongated triangle. The megaspores are 420 to 610 micrometers in diameter. The coarse microspores are 25 to 30 micrometers long. It is closely related to I. melanopoda and was first thought to be a variation of that species.
