= Isoetes maritima =

Scientific classification
- Kingdom: Plantae
- Clade: Tracheophytes
- Clade: Lycophytes
- Class: Lycopodiopsida
- Order: Isoetales
- Family: Isoetaceae
- Genus: Isoetes
- Species: I. maritima

Binomial name
- Isoetes maritima Underw.

Synonyms
- Isoetes beringensis Komarov; Isoetes echinopsora var. maritima (Underw.) A.A.Eat; Isoetes macounii A.A.Eat.

Species of quillwort

Isoetes maritima, the maritime quillwort, is a quillwort in the Isoetaceae family. It is native to Alaska, British Columbia, and Washington state. It bears eight to fifteen dark green, erect, rigid leaves that are each two to five centimeters long and 1.5 millimeters wide. The oval sporangia are small and inconspicuous, measuring at four millimeters long. The velum covers a third to a half of the sporangia. The white microspores are kidney-shaped and 30-36 micrometers long. The white megaspores are spherical and 490-670 micrometers in diameter. It is similar to I. echinospora, but with blunt spines and crests on the megaspores. I. echinospora has sharp, thin spines, though most of the other species in the genus have no megasporal spines. The epithet "maritima" and the common name "maritime quillwort", meaning "of the sea or ocean", are misnomers. Because it was first discovered by Macoun near tidal flats in British Columbia, it was treated as a coastal species. Since that time, however, it has been found in fresh-water lakes and streams.
