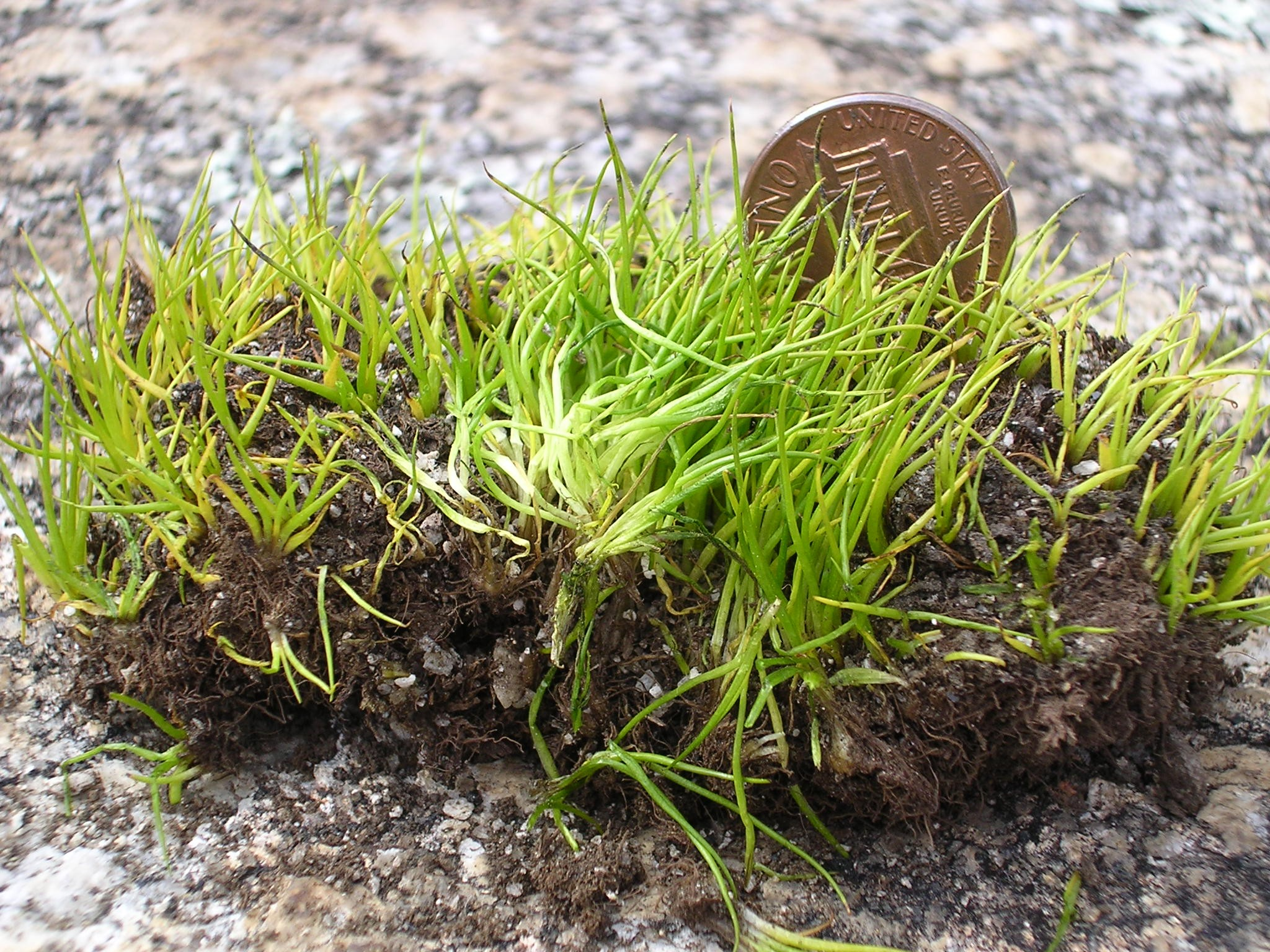
- Isoetes tegetiformans with U.S. penny for scale

Scientific classification
- Kingdom: Plantae
- Clade: Embryophytes
- Clade: Tracheophytes
- Clade: Lycophytes
- Class: Lycopodiopsida
- Order: Isoetales
- Family: Isoetaceae
- Genus: Isoetes; L.

Species
- See text

= Isoetes =

Isoetes Temporal range: Jurassic–Recent

Genus of vascular plants in the family Isoetaceae

Isoetes, commonly known as the quillworts, is a genus of lycopod. It is the only living genus in the family Isoetaceae and order Isoetales. As of 2016, there were about 200 recognized species, with a cosmopolitan distribution mostly in aquatic habitats but with the individual species often scarce to rare. Species virtually identical to modern quillworts have existed since the Jurassic epoch, though the timing of the origin of modern Isoetes is subject to considerable uncertainty.

The name of the genus may also be spelled Isoëtes. The diaeresis (two dots over the e) indicates that the o and the e are to be pronounced in two distinct syllables. Including this in print is optional; either spelling (Isoetes or Isoëtes) is correct.

== Description ==
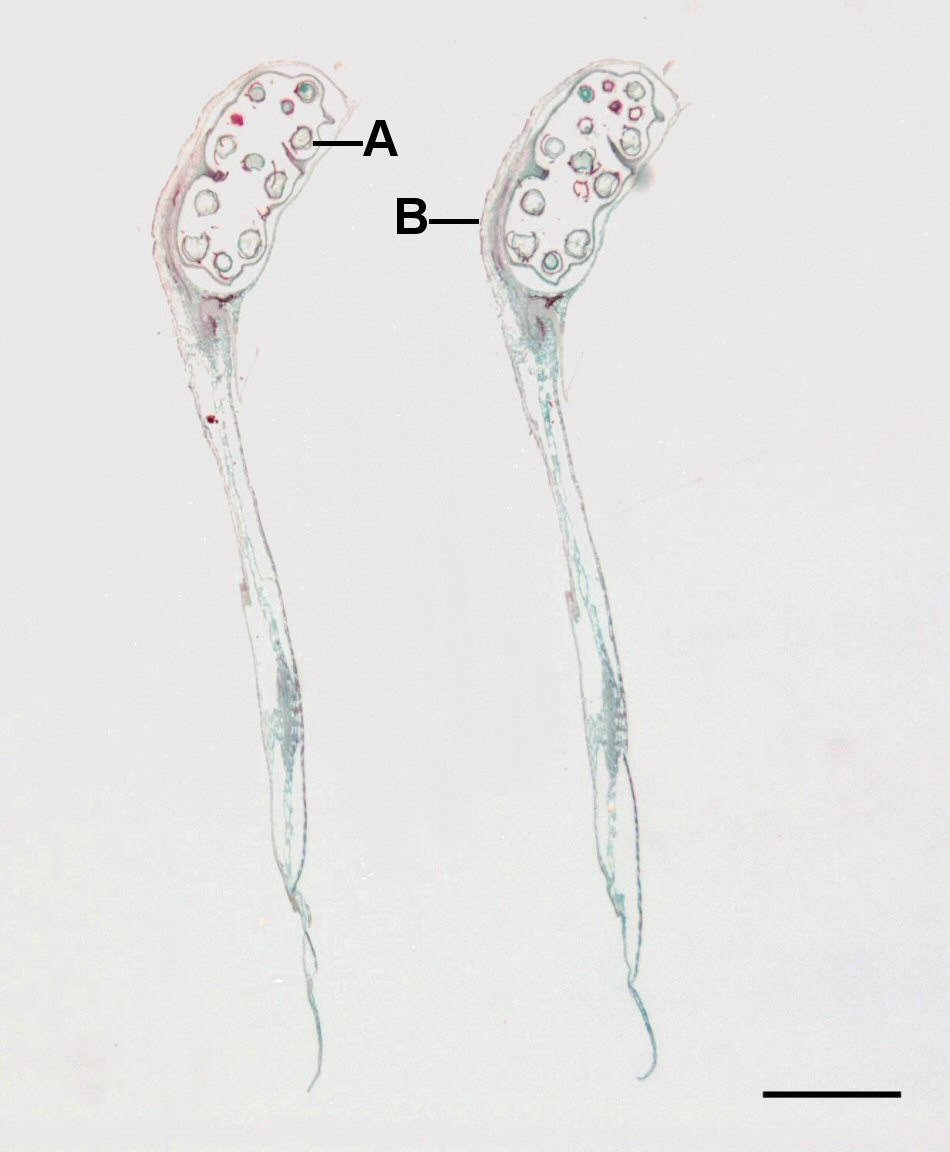
Quillwort megasporangia

Quillworts are mostly aquatic or semi-aquatic in clear ponds and slow-moving streams, though several (e.g. I. butleri, I. histrix and I. nuttallii) grow on wet ground that dries out in the summer. The quillworts are spore-producing plants and highly reliant on water dispersion. Quillworts have different ways to spread their spores based on the environment. Quillwort leaves are hollow and quill-like, with a minute ligule at the base of the upper surface arising from a central corm. The sporangia are sunk deeply in the leaf bases. Each leaf will either have many small spores or fewer large spores. Both types of leaf are found on each plant. Each leaf is narrow, 2–20 centimetres (0.8–8 in) long (exceptionally up to 100 cm or 40 in) and 0.5–3.0 mm (0.02–0.12 in) wide; they can be either evergreen, winter deciduous, or dry-season deciduous. Only 4% of total biomass, the tips of the leaves, is chlorophyllous.

The roots broaden to a swollen base up to 5 mm (0.2 in) wide where they attach in clusters to a bulb-like, underground rhizome characteristic of most quillwort species, though a few (e.g. I. tegetiformans) form spreading mats. This swollen base also contains male and female sporangia, protected by a thin, transparent covering (velum), which is used diagnostically to help identify quillwort species. They are heterosporous. Quillwort species are very difficult to distinguish by general appearance. The best way to identify them is by examining their megaspores under a microscope. Moreover, habitat, texture, spore size, and velum provide features that distinguish Isoëtes taxa. They also possess a vestigial form of secondary growth in the basal portions of its cormlike stem, an indication that they evolved from larger ancestors.

== Biochemistry and genetics ==
Quillworts use crassulacean acid metabolism (CAM) for carbon fixation. Some aquatic species do not have stomata and the leaves have a thick cuticle which prevents CO_{2} uptake, a task that is performed by their hollow roots instead, which absorb CO_{2} from the sediment. This has been studied extensively in Isoetes andicola. CAM is normally considered an adaptation to life in arid environments to prevent water loss with the plants opening their stomata at night rather than in the heat of the day. This allows CO_{2} to enter and minimises water loss. As mostly submerged aquatic plants, quillworts do not lack water and the use of CAM is considered to avoid competition with other aquatic plants for CO_{2} during daytime.

The first detailed quillwort genome sequence, of I. taiwanensis, showed that there were differences from CAM in terrestrial plants. CAM involves the enzyme phosphoenolpyruvate carboxylase (PEPC) and plants have two forms of the enzyme. One is normally involved in photosynthesis and the other in central metabolism. From the genome sequence, it appears that in quillworts, both forms are involved in photosynthesis. In addition, circadian expression of key CAM pathway genes peaked at different times of day than in angiosperms. These fundamental differences in biochemistry suggest that CAM in quillworts is probably another example of convergent evolution of CAM during the more than 300 million years since the genus diverged from other plants. However, they may also be because of differences between life in water and in the air. The genome sequence also provided two insights into its structure. First, genes and repeated non-coding regions were fairly evenly distributed across all the chromosomes. This is similar to genomes of other non-seed plants, but different from the seed plants (angiosperms) where there are distinctly more genes at the ends of chromosomes. Secondly, there was also evidence that the whole genome had been duplicated in the ancient past.

There are species that switch from CAM to C3 photosynthesis when they go from being submerged in water to living terrestrially, and develop stomata on their leaves. Some species (I. palmeri, I. lechleri and I. karsteni), even under aerial conditions, rarely form stomata, and in some cases (I. triquetra and I. andina) appear to have completely lost the ability to produce stomata.

== Reproduction ==
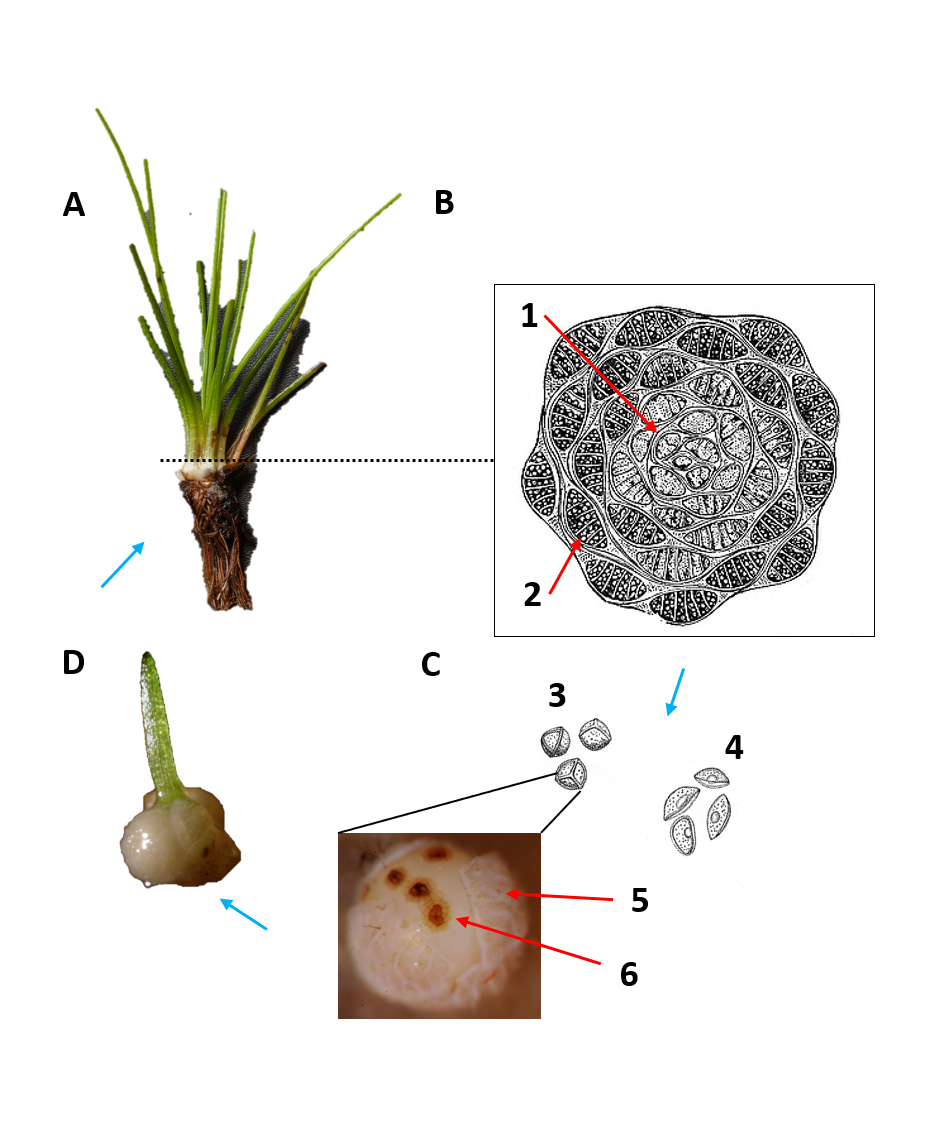
Reproductive cycle of Isoetes

=== Overview ===
Like all land plants, Isoetes undergoes an alternation of generations between a diploid sporophyte stage and a sexual haploid gametophyte stage. However, the dominance of one stage over the other has shifted over time. The development of vascular tissue and subsequent diversification of land plants coincides with the increased dominance of the sporophyte and reduction of the gametophyte. Isoetes, as members of the Lycopodiopsida class, are part of the oldest extant lineage that reflects this shift to a sporophyte dominant lifecycle. In closely related lineages, such as the extinct Lepidodendron, spores were dispersed by the sporophyte through large collections of sporangia called strobili for wind-based spore dispersal. However, Isoetes are small heterosporous semi-aquatic plants, with different reproductive needs and challenges than large tree-like land plants.

=== Description ===
Like the rest of the Lycopodiopsida class, Isoetes reproduces with spores. Among the lycophytes, both Isoetes and the Selaginellaceae (spikemosses) are heterosporous, while the remaining lycophyte family Lycopodiaceae (clubmosses) is homosporous. As heterosporous plants, fertile Isoetes sporophytes produce megaspores and microspores, which develop in the megasporangia and microsporangia. These spores are highly ornate and are the primary way by which species are identified, although no one functional purpose of the intricate surface patterns is agreed upon. The megasporangia occur within the outermost microphylls (single-veined leaves) of the plant while the microsporangia are found in the innermost microphylls. This pattern of development is hypothesized to improve the dispersal of the heavier megaspore. These spores then germinate and divide into mega- and micro- gametophytes. The microgametophytes have antheridia, which in turn produce sperm. The megagametophytes have archegonia, which produce egg cells. Fertilization takes place when the motile sperm from a microgametophyte locates the archegonia of a megagametophyte and swims inside to fertilize the egg.

Outside of heterospory, a distinguishing feature of Isoetes (and Selaginella) from other pteridophytes, is that their gametophytes grow inside the spores. This means that the gametophytes never leave the protection of the spore that disperses them, cracking the perispore (the outer layer of the spore) just enough to allow the passage of gametes. This is fundamentally different from ferns, where the gametophyte is a photosynthetic plant exposed to the elements of its environment. However, containment creates a separate problem for Isoetes, which is that the gametophytes have no way to acquire energy on their own. Isoetes sporophytes solve this problem by provisioning starches and other nutrients to the spores as an energy reserve for the eventual gametophytes. Although not a homologous process, this provisioning is somewhat analogous to other modes of offspring resource investment in seed-plants, such as fruits and seeds. The extent to which resources provisioned to the megaspore also support the growth of the new sporophyte is unknown in Isoetes.

=== Dispersal ===
Spore dispersal occurs primarily in water (hydrochory) but may also occur via adherence to animals (zoochory) and as a result of ingestion (endozoochory). These are among the reasons suggested for the ornamentations of the spore, with some authors demonstrating that certain patterns seem well-adapted for sticking to relevant animals like waterfowl. Another critical element of dispersal is the observation that in some species of Isoetes, the outer coat of megaspores have pockets that trap microspores, a condition known as synaptospory. Typically, heterospory means that colonization and long-dispersal are more difficult due to the fact that a single spore cannot grow a bisexual gametophyte and thus cannot establish a new population from a single spore as can happen in homosporous ferns. Isoetes may mitigate this issue via microspores stuck to megaspores, greatly increasing the possibility of successful fertilization upon dispersal.

== Taxonomy ==
Compared to other genera, Isoetes is poorly known. The first critical monograph on their taxonomy, written by Norma Etta Pfeiffer, was published in 1922 and remained a standard reference into the twenty-first century. Even after studies with cytology, scanning electron microscopy, and chromatography, species are difficult to identify and their phylogeny is disputed. Vegetative characteristics commonly used to distinguish other genera, such as leaf length, rigidity, color, or shape are variable and depend on the habitat. Most classification systems for Isoetes rely on spore characteristics, which make species identification nearly impossible without microscopy. Some botanists split the genus, separating two South American species into the genus Stylites, although molecular data place these species among other species of Isoetes, so that Stylites does not warrant taxonomic recognition.

=== Evolution ===
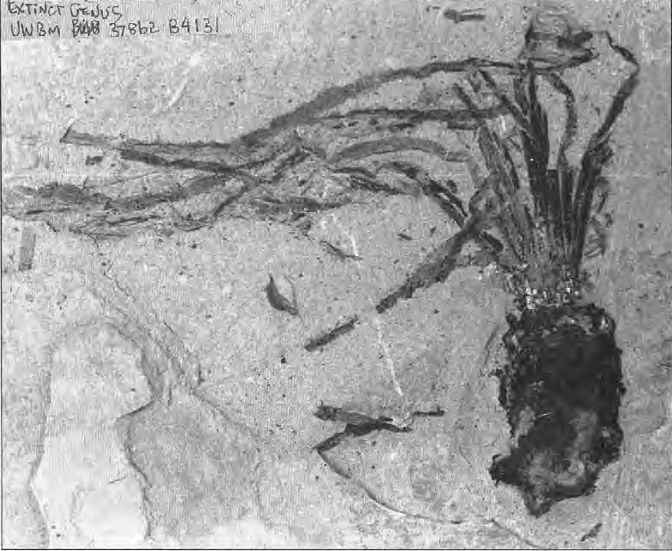
Undescribed Isoetites fossil Klondike Mountain Formation

The earliest fossil that has been assigned to the genus is †Isoetes beestonii from the latest Permian of New South Wales, Australia, around 252 million years ago. However, the relationships of pre-Jurassic isoetaleans to modern Isotetes have been regarded as unclear by other authors. Isoetites rolandii from the Late Jurassic of North America has been described as the "earliest clear example of a isoetalean lycopsid containing all the major features uniting modern Isoetes", including the loss of the elongated stem and vegetative leaves. Based on this, it has been stated that "the overall morphology of Isoetes appears to have persisted virtually unchanged since at least the Jurassic". The timing of the origin of the crown group is uncertain. Wood et al (2020) asserted there to be no morphological features that define the major clades within Isoetes, and no fossils are known that can be definitively assigned to the crown group. While Wood et al. suggested a young origin dating to the early Cenozoic based on molecular clock estimates, the results were questioned by Wikström et al. (2023) who regarded the molecular clock as providing no firm evidence for the origin time of the genus, which could date to the Mesozoic or even the late Paleozoic, depending on the calibration method used.

=== Extant species ===
As of November 2019, Plants of the World Online accepted the following extant species:

- I. abyssinica Chiov.
- I. acadiensis Kott
- I. aemulans J.P.Roux
- I. aequinoctialis Welw. ex A.Br.
- I. alcalophila S.Halloy
- I. alpina Kirk
- I. alstonii C.F.Reed & Verdc.
- I. amazonica A.Br.
- I. anatolica Prada & Rolleri
- I. andicola (Amstutz) L.D.Gómez
- I. andina Spruce ex Hook.
- I. appalachiana D.F.Brunt. & D.M.Britton
- I. araucaniana Macluf & Hickey
- I. asiatica (Makino) Makino
- I. attenuata C.R.Marsden & Chinnock
- I. australis S.Williams
- I. azorica Durieu
- I. baculata Hickey & H.P.Fuchs
- I. biafrana Alston
- I. bischlerae H.P.Fuchs
- I. bolanderi Engelm.
- I. boliviensis U.Weber
- I. boomii Luebke
- I. boryana Durieu
- I. boyacensis H.P.Fuchs
- I. bradei Herter
- I. brasiliensis H.P.Fuchs
- I. brevicula E.R.L.Johnson
- I. butleri Engelm.
- I. cangae J.B.S.Pereira, Salino & Stützel
- I. capensis
- I. caroli E.R.L.Johnson
- I. caroliniana (A.A.Eaton) Luebke is regarded by Plants of the World Online as a synonym of I. valida, but other sources treat it as a valid species
- I. chubutiana Hickey, Macluf & W.C.Taylor
- I. coromandelina L.f.
- I. creussensis Lazare & S.Riba
- I. cristata C.R.Marsden & Chinnock
- I. cubana Engelm.
- I. delilei (Bory) Rothm.
- I. dispora Hickey
- I. dixitii Shende
- I. drummondii A.Braun
- I. durieui Bory
- I. echinospora Durieu
- I. ecuadoriensis Aspl.
- I. ekmanii U.Weber
- I. elatior A.Braun
- I. eludens J.P.Roux, Hopper & Rhian J.Sm.
- I. engelmannii A.Braun
- I. escondidensis S.Halloy
- I. eshbaughii Hickey & H.P.Fuchs
- I. flaccida Shuttlew.
- I. fluitans M.I.Romero
- I. fuliginosa R.L.Small & Hickey
- I. fuscomarginata H.P.Fuchs
- I. gardneriana Kunze
- I. georgiana Luebke
- I. giessii Launert
- I. gigantea U.Weber
- I. graniticola D.F.Brunt.
- I. gunnii A.Braun
- I. gymnocarpa (Gennari) A.Braun
- I. habbemensis Alston
- I. hallasanensis H.K.Choi, Ch.Kim & J.Jung
- I. haussknechtii Troìa & Greuter
- I. hawaiiensis W.C.Taylor & W.H.Wagner
- I. heldreichii Wettst.
- I. hemivelata R.L.Small & Hickey
- I. herzogii U.Weber
- I. hewitsonii Hickey
- I. hieronymi U.Weber
- I. histrix Bory
- I. hopei J.R.Croft
- I. howellii Engelm.
- I. humilior A.Braun
- I. hypsophila Hand.-Mazz.
- I. inflata E.R.L.Johnson
- I. jaegeri Pitot
- I. jamaicensis Hickey
- I. japonica A.Braun
- I. jejuensis H.K.Choi, Ch.Kim & J.Jung
- I. junciformis D.F.Brunt. & D.M.Britton
- I. karstenii A.Braun
- I. killipii C.V.Morton
- I. kirkii A.Braun
- I. labri-draconis N.R.Crouch
- I. lacustris L.
- I. laosiensis C.Kim & H.K.Choi
- I. lechleri Mett.
- I. libanotica Musselman, Bolin & R.D.Bray
- I. lithophila N.Pfeiff.
- I. longissima Bory
- I. louisianensis Thieret
- I. luetzelburgii U.Weber
- I. macrospora
- I. malinverniana Ces. & De Not.
- I. maritima Underw. – maritime quillwort
- I. martii A.Braun
- I. mattaponica Musselman & W.C.Taylor
- I. maxima Hickey, Macluf & Link-Pérez
- I. melanopoda J.Gay & Durieu (I. virginica N.Pfeiff.)
- I. melanospora Engelm.
- I. melanotheca Alston
- I. mexicana Underw. (syn. Isoetes montezumae A.A.Eaton)
- I. microvela D.F.Brunt.
- I. minima A.A.Eaton
- I. mississippiensis S.W.Leonard, et al.
- I. mongerensis E.R.L.Johnson
- I. montana U.Weber
- I. mourabaptistae J.B.S.Pereira,et al.
- I. muelleri A.Braun
- I. naipiana P.G.Windisch, Lorscheitt. & Nervo
- I. nana J.B.S.Pereira
- I. neoguineensis
- I. nigritiana A.Br.
- I. nigroreticulata Verdc.
- I. novogranadensis H.P.Fuchs
- I. nuttallii A.Braun
- I. occidentalis L.F.Hend.
- I. olympica A.Br.
- I. orcuttii A.A.Eaton
- I. organensis U.Weber
- I. orientalis Hong Liu & Q.F.Wang
- I. ovata N.Pfeiff.
- I. pallida Hickey
- I. palmeri H.P.Fuchs
- I. panamensis Maxon & C.V.Morton
- I. parvula Hickey
- I. pedersenii H.P.Fuchs ex E.I.Meza & Macluf
- I. perralderiana Durieu & Letourn. ex Milde
- I. perrieriana Iversen
- I. philippinensis Merr. & L.M.Perry
- I. phrygia Hausskn.
- I. piedmontana (N.Pfeiff.) C.F.Reed
- I. pitotii Alston
- I. precocia R.L.Small & Hickey
- I. pringlei Underw.
- I. prototypus D.M.Britton & Goltz
- I. pseudojaponica M.Takamiya, Mits.Watan. & K.Ono
- I. pusilla C.R.Marsden & Chinnock
- I. quiririensis J.B.S.Pereira & Labiak
- I. ramboi Herter
- I. riparia Engelm. ex A.Braun (syn I. hyemalis D.F.Brunt.)
- I. sabatina Troìa & Azzella
- I. saccharata Engelm.
- I. sahyadrii Mahab.
- I. saracochensis Hickey
- I. savatieri Franch.
- I. schweinfurthii A.Br.
- I. sehnemii H.P.Fuchs
- I. septentrionalis D.F.Brunt.
- I. serracarajensis J.B.S.Pereira, Salino & Stützel
- I. setacea Lam.
- I. sinensis T.C.Palmer (synonym I. coreana Y.H.Chung & H.K.Choi)
- I. smithii H.P.Fuchs
- I. spannagelii H.P.Fuchs
- I. spinulospora C.Jermy & Schelpe
- I. stellenbossiensis A.V.Duthie
- I. stephanseniae A.V.Duthie
- I. stevensii J.R.Croft
- I. storkii T.C.Palmer
- I. taiwanensis De Vol
- I. tamaulipana Mora-Olivo, A.Mend. & Mart.-Aval.
- I. tegetiformans Rury
- I. tenella Léman ex Desv.
- I. tennesseensis Luebke & Budke
- I. tenuifolia Jermy
- I. tenuissima Boreau
- I. texana Singhurst, Rushing & W.C.Holmes
- I. todaroana Troìa & Raimondo
- I. toximontana Musselman & J.P.Roux
- I. transvaalensis C.Jermy & Schelpe
- I. triangula U.Weber
- I. tripus A.Braun
- I. truncata Clute
- I. tuckermanii A.Braun ex Engelm.
- I. tuerckheimii Brause
- I. udupiensis P.K.Shukla, G.K.Srivast., S.K.Shukla & P.K.Rajagopal
- I. ulei U.Weber
- I. valida Clute
- I. vanensis M.Keskin & G.Zare
- I. vermiculata Hickey
- I. viridimontana M.A.Rosenthal & W.C.Taylor
- I. weberi Herter
- I. welwitschii A.Br. ex Kuhn
- I. wormaldii Sim
- I. yunguiensis Q.F.Wang & W.C.Taylor

Many species, such as the Louisiana quillwort and the mat-forming quillwort, are endangered species. Several species of Isoetes are commonly called Merlin's grass, especially I. lacustris, but also the endangered species I. tegetiformans.

=== Hybrids ===
- I. × altonharvillii Musselman
- I. × brittonii D.F.Brunt. & W.C.Taylor
- I. × bruntonii Knepper & Musselman
- I. × carltaylorii Musselman
- I. × dodgei A.A.Eaton
- I. × eatonii R.Dodge – Eaton's quillwort
- I. × echtuckerii D.F.Brunt. & D.M.Britton
- I. × fairbrothersii J.D.Montgom. & W.C.Taylor
- I. × foveolata A.A.Eaton
- I. × gopalkrishnae S.K.Singh, P.K.Shukla & N.K.Dubey
- I. × harveyi A.A.Eaton (syn. I. × heterospora Eaton)
- I. × herb-wagneri W.C.Taylor
- I. × hickeyi W.C.Taylor & Luebke
- I. × jeffreyi D.M.Britton & D.F.Brunt.
- I. × marensis D.M.Britton & D.F.Brunt.
- I. × michinokuana M.Takamiya, Mits.Watan. & K.Ono
- I. × novae-angliae D.F.Brunt. & D.M.Britton
- I. × paratunica D.F.Brunt., Mochalova & A.A.Bobrov
- I. × pseudotruncata D.M.Britton & D.F.Brunt.

=== Fossil species ===
- †Isoetes beestonii Retallack (Permian, Australia)
- †Isoetes bulbiformis Drinnan (Cretaceous, Australia)
- †lsoetes ermayinensis Wang (Triassic, China)
- †Isoetes gramineoides Bock (Triassic, US)
- †Isoetes hillii D.M. Britton (Miocene, Tasmania)
