= Isoetes capensis =

Conservation status
- Endangered (IUCN 3.1)

Scientific classification
- Kingdom: Plantae
- Clade: Tracheophytes
- Clade: Lycophytes
- Class: Lycopodiopsida
- Order: Isoetales
- Family: Isoetaceae
- Genus: Isoetes
- Species: I. capensis

Binomial name
- Isoetes capensis A.V.Duthie

South African quillwort species

Isoetes capensis, the cape quillwort, is a species of quillwort from South Africa.

== Description ==
The cape quillwort is a tufted geophyte with horny toothed scales. It has between 5 and 35 leaves that bear sporangia. These are held at a 45-degree angle. This is unusual as most species have perpendicular leaves. These are slender (4 mm (0.16 in) at the base) and reach a length of up to 20 cm (7.9 in), with a heart-shaped appendage (ligule) at the base. The ligule is up to 1 mm (0.039 in) long and pale, although it is darker at the point of attachment. The sporangia are completely covered in a thin membrane. They have a diameter of 2–5 mm (0.079–0.197 in) and are oval or round in shape.

This species shows immense variability in its spores. The surface ranges from having irregular tubercules to interconnected ridges to being covered in a net-like structure of ridges. All of these surface sculptings may be found in a single population. They grey-white megaspores have a diameter of 0.39–0.57 mm (0.015–0.022 in).

This species has a three lobed pseudocorm. The dark brown leathery bud scales are triangular and have dimensions of about 3 by 3 mm (0.12 by 0.12 in). They may also have a hair that is about 3 mm (0.12 in) long.

== Distribution and habitat ==
The cape quillwort is endemic to the Western Cape of South Africa. It is found between Darling, Stellenbosch and Worcester and an altitude of up to 300 m (980 ft). It grows on sandy clay soils in low areas that experience seasonal flooding as well as around vleis. There are nine subpopulations with combined area of occupancy of 44–56 km^{2} (17–22 sq mi). At least one specimen has also been recorded from Somerset West.

== Ecology ==
While it may form colonies, this species is often difficult to find as it grows amongst grasses.

This is a seasonal species. It disappears when the area it is growing in dries up, leaving behind only the pseudocorms. Each pseudocorm is protected by a series of overlapping brown scales, which remain as a leathery structure surrounding the new leaves that appear in the next wet season. Specimens have, however, been found to live for more than three years in kept submerged in water. This kind of immersion did not result in any elongation of the leaves or any other changes in the form of the specimens.

== Conservation ==
This species is considered to be endangered by the South African National Biodiversity Institute. While the largest subpopulation is made up of between 500 and 1000 individuals, most subpopulations have fewer than 100 plants. When assessed in 2018, it was estimated that 760-3740 individuals remain and that the population is continuing to decline. While this species is easily overlooked, little of its habitat remains and what habitat is left is continuing to decline and deteriorate. This species is also threatened by urban and agricultural expansion, disrupted water systems, eutrophication and alien species.

In 1955 the University of Cape Town Lecturer Edith Stephens donated a piece of land (now known as the Edith Stephens Wetland Park) in an attempt to preserve the type population of the cape quillwort. It is currently, however, rare in this protected area. A census in 2009 found only ten remaining individuals.
