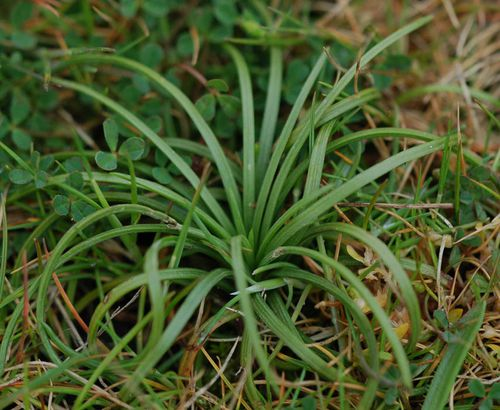

Scientific classification
- Kingdom: Plantae
- Clade: Tracheophytes
- Clade: Lycophytes
- Class: Lycopodiopsida
- Order: Isoetales
- Family: Isoetaceae
- Genus: Isoetes
- Species: I. histrix

Binomial name
- Isoetes histrix Bory

= Isoetes histrix =

European and African species of quillwort

Isoetes histrix, the land quillwort, is an aquatic pteridophyte native to the Mediterranean region, northwestern Africa, and the coasts of western Europe northwest to Cornwall. It occurs mainly in temporarily wet habitats, otherwise called vernal pools.

The leaves are 3–8 cm long, and summer-deciduous. It differs from Isoetes durieui by its large black scales between the leaves, though these are not always present, and a surface of megaspores with tubercles, whereas I. durieui has a network of ridges.
