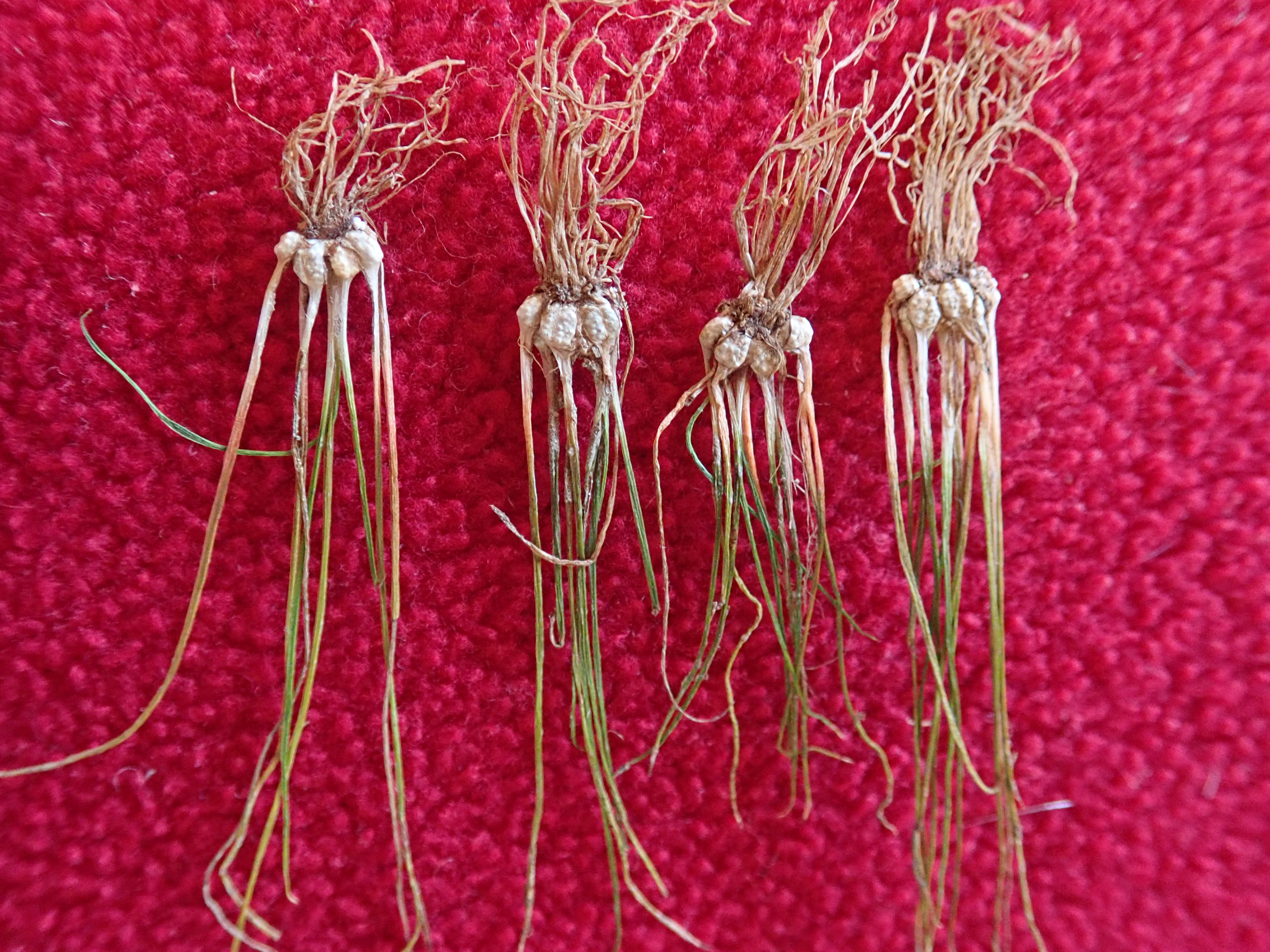

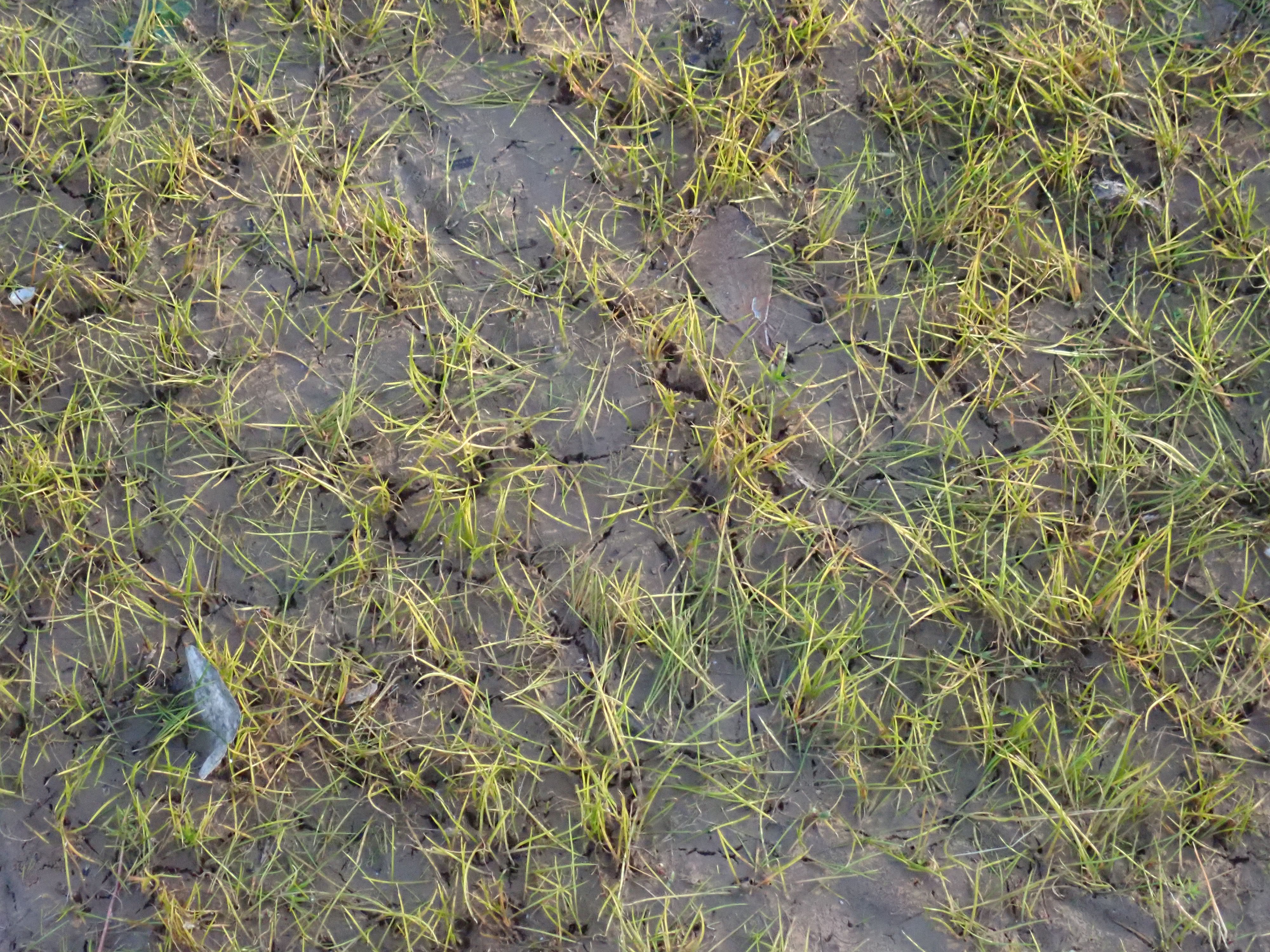
- Ephemeral swamp near Narran Lake NR

Scientific classification
- Kingdom: Plantae
- Clade: Tracheophytes
- Clade: Lycophytes
- Class: Lycopodiopsida
- Order: Isoetales
- Family: Isoetaceae
- Genus: Isoetes
- Species: I. muelleri

Binomial name
- Isoetes muelleri A.Braun

Synonyms
- Calamaria muelleri (A.Braun) Kuntze

= Isoetes muelleri =

Species of plant native to Australia

Isoetes muelleri is a species of quillwort, a type of lycophyte. This generally apomictic aquatic plant is native to Australia.

== Distribution and habitat ==
It is widespread across all the states and territories of Australia, growing in a wide range of habitats, from subalpine tarns, lakes and slow-moving streams where it is submerged throughout the year, to ephemeral swamps, and in hot and cold to climates.
