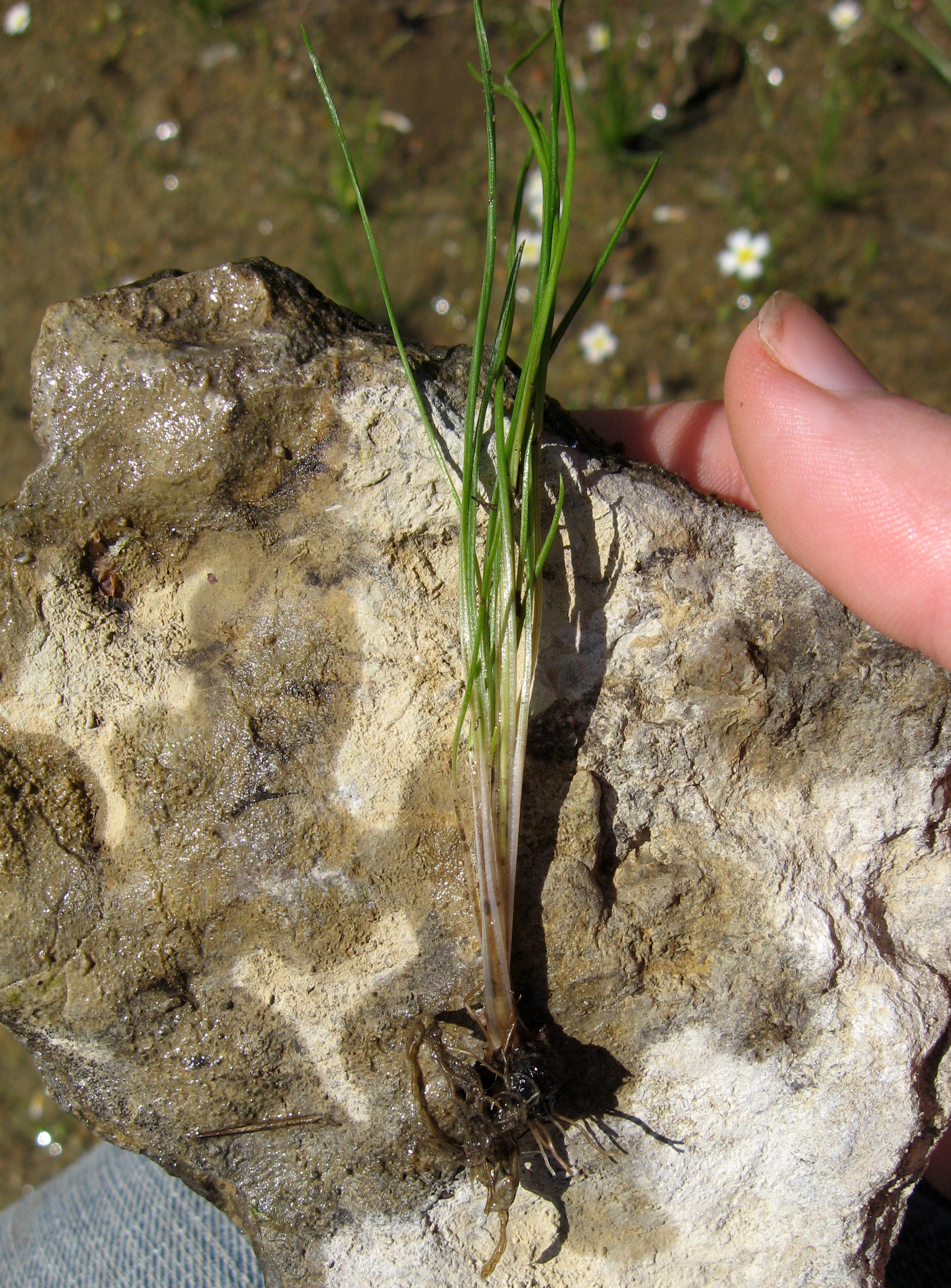

Scientific classification
- Kingdom: Plantae
- Clade: Tracheophytes
- Clade: Lycophytes
- Class: Lycopodiopsida
- Order: Isoetales
- Family: Isoetaceae
- Genus: Isoetes
- Species: I. butleri

Binomial name
- Isoetes butleri Engelm.

= Isoetes butleri =

Eastern North American species of quillwort

Isoetes butleri, commonly known as limestone quillwort, is a species of plant in the quillwort family, a member of the lycophytes.

It is native to the eastern United States, where it is scattered and local. It is found almost exclusively on seasonally wet alkaline soils. Common habitats include rocky prairies and glades, most often over limestone. This species is inconspicuous and easily overlooked, due to its superficial similarity to a vegetative grass or sedge.

The leaves of Isoetes butleri die back at the end of spring, when its habitat becomes hot and dry. It is then reduced to a below ground corm.
