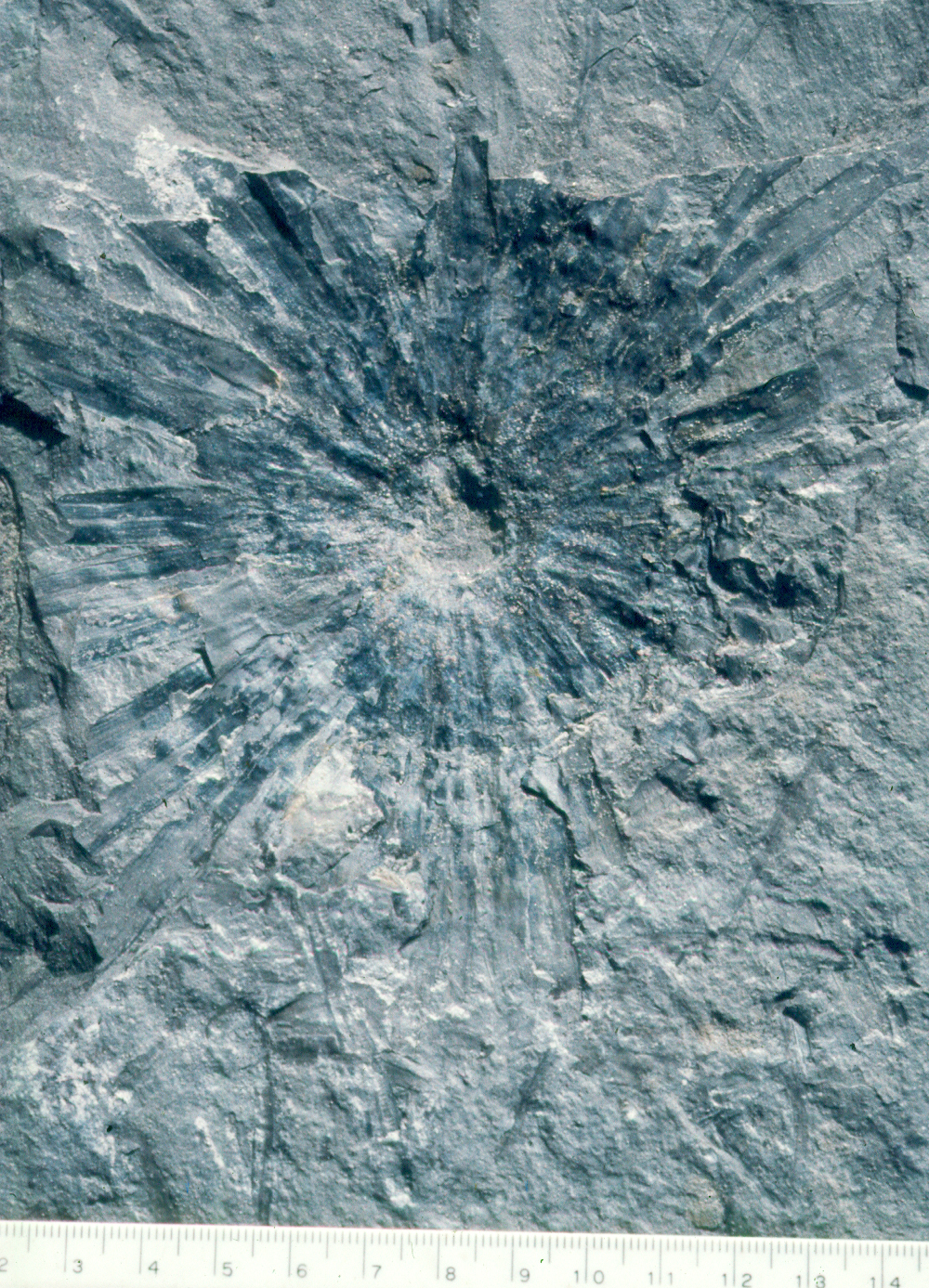
- Complete plant of Isoetes beestonii from latest Permian Coalcliff Sandstone in South Bulli Colliery, NSW, Australia.

Scientific classification
- Kingdom: Plantae
- Clade: Tracheophytes
- Clade: Lycophytes
- Class: Lycopodiopsida
- Order: Isoetales
- Family: Isoetaceae
- Genus: Isoetes
- Species: †I. beestonii

Binomial name
- †Isoetes beestonii Retallack

= Isoetes beestonii =

Isoetes beestonii Temporal range: Late Permian

Species of spore-bearing plant

Isoetes beestonii is a species of isoetalan plant from the latest Permian of New South Wales and Queensland. Originally considered earliest Triassic, it is now known to be latest Permian in age, immediately before the Permian Triassic mass extinction. It has been suggested to be the earliest member of the genus Isoetes, which contains living quillworts, though it differs from living Isoetes in some aspects, with modern forms of Isoetes possibly emerging during the Jurassic.

== Description ==
Isoetes beestonii is preserved as whole plants in life position within bedding planes, and presumably lived as an early successional weed in lake and pond sedimentary environments, like living Isoetes. Its leaves were wider and more succulent than modern species of Isoetes. Like modern Isoetes, fertile plants were little different from sterile plants, unlike Early Triassic Tomiostrobus which formed woody conelike fertile plants.

== Ecology ==
I. beestonii is thought to have grown in monospecific assemblages around and within oligotrophic ponds and lakes.

== Taxonomy ==
Wood et al. (2020) regarded the relationship between pre-Jurassic isoetalean species and modern Isoetes with uncertainty.

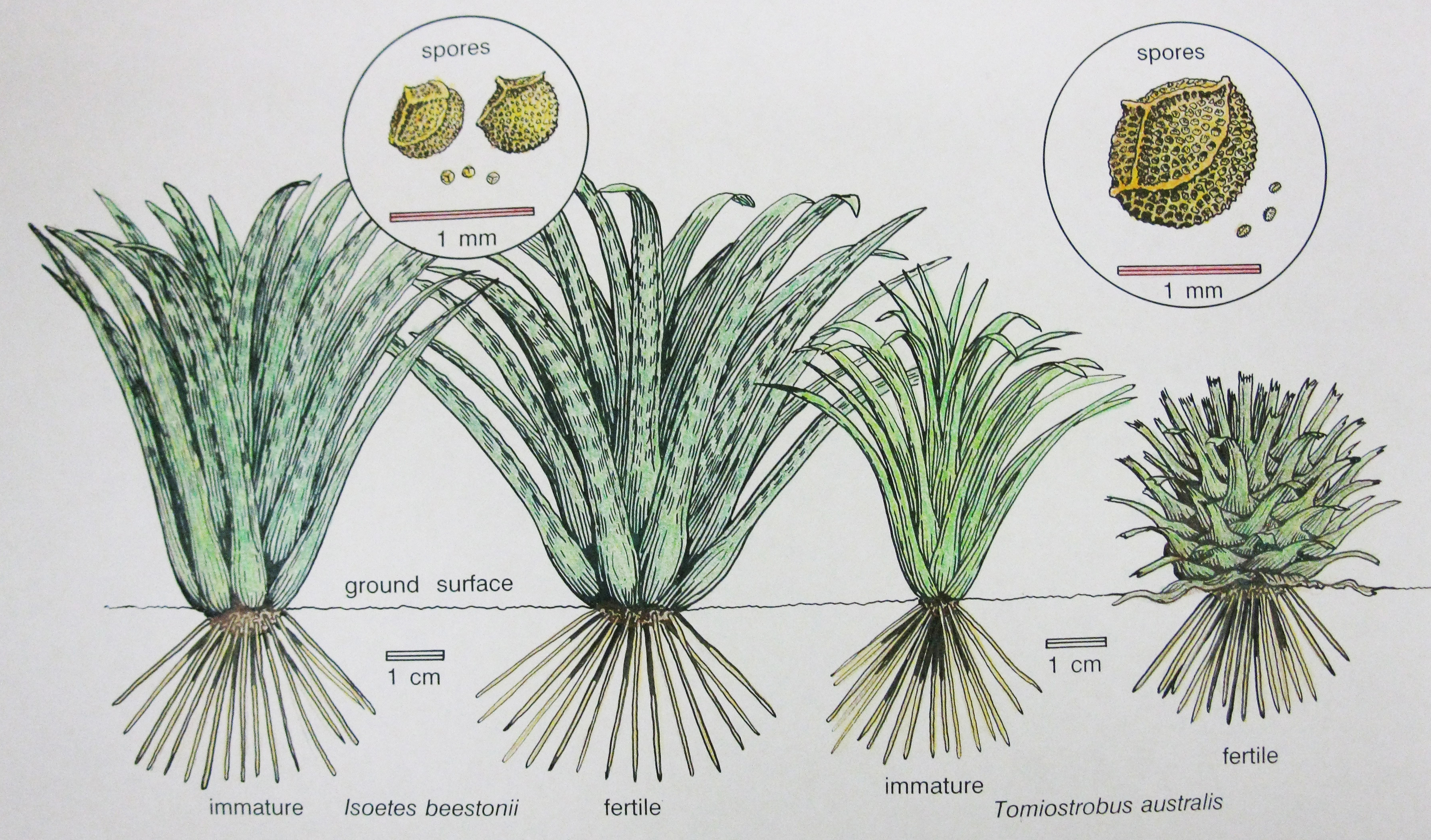
Reconstructions of sterile and fertile examples of Isoetes beestonii from the latest Permian Coal Cliff Sandstone of South Bulli Colliery, NSW, and of Tomiostrobus australis from the Early Triassic Gosford Formation near Terrigal, NSW

== See also ==
- Evolution of plants
