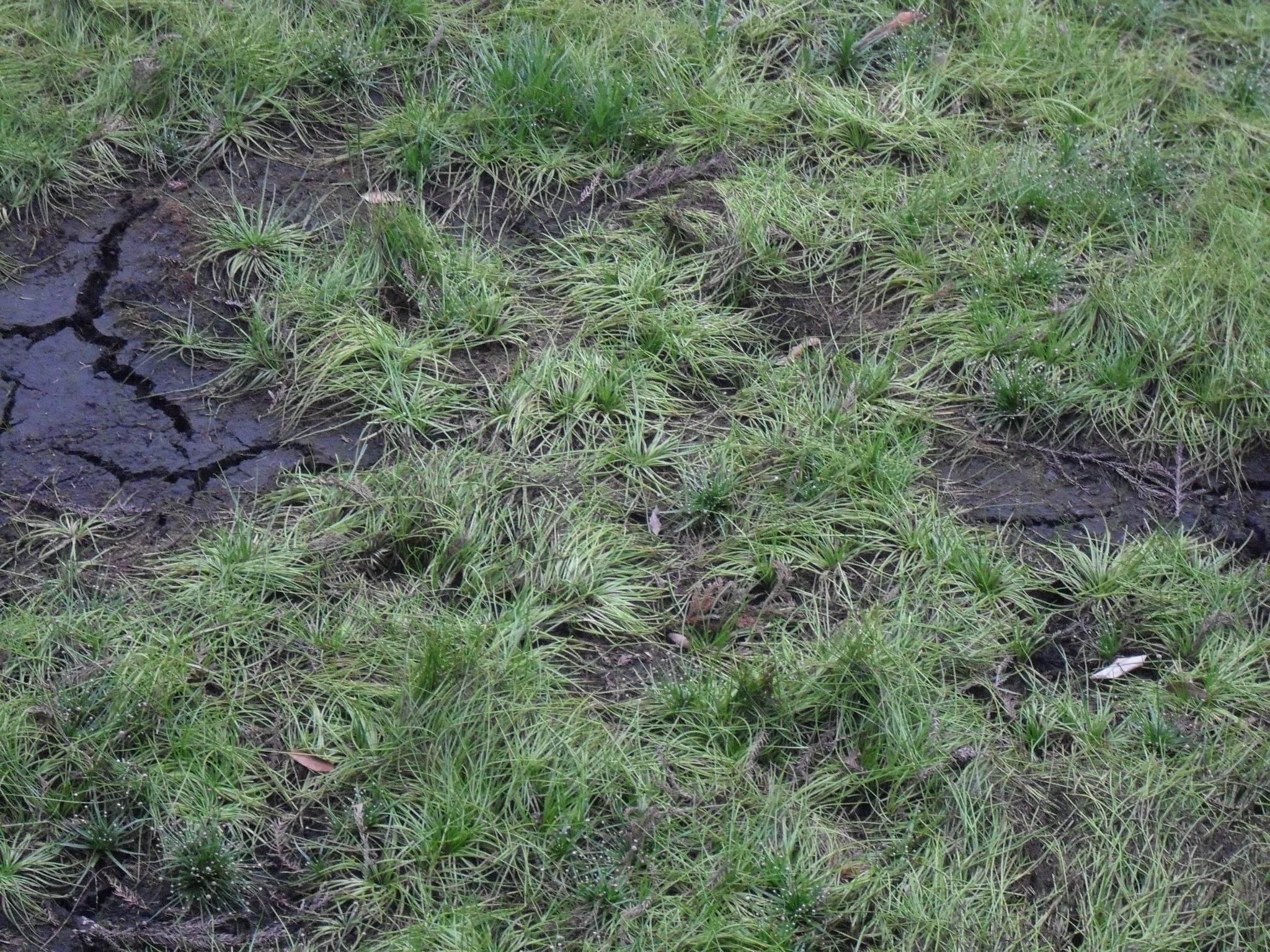

Conservation status
- Critically Endangered (IUCN 3.1)

Scientific classification
- Kingdom: Plantae
- Clade: Embryophytes
- Clade: Tracheophytes
- Clade: Lycophytes
- Class: Lycopodiopsida
- Order: Isoetales
- Family: Isoetaceae
- Genus: Isoetes
- Species: I. taiwanensis

Binomial name
- Isoetes taiwanensis De Vol

= Isoetes taiwanensis =

Taiwanese endemic species of quillwort

Isoetes taiwanensis is a species of plant in the family Isoetaceae. It is endemic to Taiwan, and the only species of quillwort there. Isoetes taiwanensis can now only be found in Menghuan Pond in Taipei's Yangmingshan National Park.

== Description ==
Isoetes taiwanensis is an aquatic plants. The leaves are short and slender, about 5 to 25 centimeters long, with a single vein and containing four air canals. The plant has a corm divided into three to four segments. The roots grow in the muddy bottom of the water.

The sporangia grow on the inner side of the leaf base and are differentiated by size. The larger sporangia are ovoid, appearing grayish-white when moist but turning white when dry. The smaller sporangia are gray and oval-shaped.

In Taiwan, it grows submersed in shallow ponds for most of the year. During the winter, which is the high water period, Isoetes taiwanensis can be a submerged plant. In the dry season of summer, it becomes an emergent plant. However, the moist bottom mud helps the plant survive the dry period.

== Crassulacean acid metabolism ==
The first quillwort genome sequence was of I. taiwanensis. This showed that there were differences in its biochemistry from terrestrial plants that had adopted the same strategy for CO_{2} fixation, namely Crassulacean acid metabolism (CAM). This involves the enzyme phosphoenolpyruvate carboxylase (PEPC) and plants have two forms of the enzyme. One is normally involved in CO_{2} fixation during photosynthesis and the other in central metabolism. From the genome sequence, it appears that in I. taiwanensis both forms are involved in photosynthesis. In addition, the time of day of the peak abundance of some of the components of CAM was different from terrestrial plants. These fundamental differences in biochemistry suggests that CAM in I. taiwanensis, and likely all quillworts, is another example of convergent evolution of CAM.

== Desiccation-tolerant ==
Isoetes taiwanensis could tolerate and overcome the drought stress and quickly recover once the habitat condition become adequate. Serial observations were conducted to detect its ability to tolerate drought. The dried plants, retained 50% and 30% vitality for six and 12 months of dry spans respectively, even when their fresh weight dropped to ca. 9%. These viable plants regenerated new leaves and roots from corms after rehydration within few weeks.

== Crisis ==
Isoetes taiwanensis, which was classified as a critically endangered species by the International Union of Conservation of Nature in 2001. Because of the landification of the pond, the habitat of Isoetes taiwanensis has been reduced. Additionally, other terrestrial plants are encroaching on its living space.

In order to protect the habitat, scientists are conducting research on the terrain around the Menghuan Pond. The result of researches shows Isoetes taiwanensis is found to be more competitive in the region, implemented by excavation and consolidation, with deeper water depth and higher water conservation. The adaptative water level management at the planning and design phases and rehabilitating these essential habitat patterns to enrich the survival of Isoetes taiwanensis in the dry season.

== See also ==
- List of protected species in Taiwan
- List of endemic species of Taiwan
