= Isoetes toximontana =

Gifberg quillwort

Conservation status
- Least Concern (IUCN 3.1)

Scientific classification
- Kingdom: Plantae
- Clade: Tracheophytes
- Clade: Lycophytes
- Class: Lycopodiopsida
- Order: Isoetales
- Family: Isoetaceae
- Genus: Isoetes
- Species: I. toximontana

Binomial name
- Isoetes toximontana Musselman & J.P. Roux

South African species of quillwort

Isoetes toximontana, the Gifberg quillwort, is a plant species native to the Northern Cape and Western Cape regions of South Africa. It is known from only 3 sites. The type locality is on the slopes of Gifberg, a mountain forming part of the eastern boundary of the Olifants River Valley. The name "Gifberg" means "poison mountain"; this is in reference to a poisonous tree called "gifboom", Euphorbia virosa, that is endemic to the area. The specific epithet "toximontana" is a Latin translation of the Afrikaans name of the mountain.

Isoetes toximontana is an herb which grows in shallow water, very often emerging above the surface. Leaves are 3-10 per plant, up to 42 mm long, elliptical in cross-section. Mega- and microsporophylls may be found on the same plant. Megaspores number up to 36 per sporangium, gray-green, drying olive green, each up to 320 μm in diameter, covered with tubercules (bumps) over most of the surface. Microspores are brown, up to 25 μm in diameter.
