= Isoetes ecuadoriensis =

Conservation status
- Vulnerable (IUCN 3.1)

Scientific classification
- Kingdom: Plantae
- Clade: Tracheophytes
- Clade: Lycophytes
- Class: Lycopodiopsida
- Order: Isoetales
- Family: Isoetaceae
- Genus: Isoetes
- Species: I. ecuadoriensis

Binomial name
- Isoetes ecuadoriensis Aspl.

Ecuadorian endemic species of quillwort

Isoetes ecuadoriensis is a species of plant in the family Isoetaceae. It is endemic to Ecuador. Its natural habitats are subtropical or tropical high-altitude grassland and alpine wetlands. It is threatened by habitat loss.
