= Isoetes alpina =

Scientific classification
- Kingdom: Plantae
- Clade: Tracheophytes
- Clade: Lycophytes
- Class: Lycopodiopsida
- Order: Isoetales
- Family: Isoetaceae
- Genus: Isoetes
- Species: I. alpina

Binomial name
- Isoetes alpina Kirk

New Zealand endemic species of quillwort

Isoetes alpina, the alpine quillwort, is an aquatic plant in the class Lycopodiopsida, endemic to New Zealand.

Its main habitats are the bottom of lakes, rivers and streams, where it often forms extensive colonies in fine sediments or coarse sand.
