= Isoetes brevicula =

Scientific classification
- Kingdom: Plantae
- Clade: Tracheophytes
- Clade: Lycophytes
- Class: Lycopodiopsida
- Order: Isoetales
- Family: Isoetaceae
- Genus: Isoetes
- Species: I. brevicula

Binomial name
- Isoetes brevicula E.R.L.Johnson

Western Australian species of quillwort

Isoetes brevicula is a quillwort species native to Western Australia. It is a cormous, perennial, herb or (fern ally), to 1 cm (0.39 in) high, stock 3-lobed; leaves 4–8 mm (0.16–0.31 in) long; mature megaspores greyish white when dry. Submerged in rock pools on granitic outcrops.
