= Isoetes malinverniana =

Conservation status
- Critically Endangered (IUCN 3.1)

Scientific classification
- Kingdom: Plantae
- Clade: Tracheophytes
- Clade: Lycophytes
- Class: Lycopodiopsida
- Order: Isoetales
- Family: Isoetaceae
- Genus: Isoetes
- Species: I. malinverniana

Binomial name
- Isoetes malinverniana Ces. & De Not.

Italian endemic species of quillwort

Isoetes malinverniana, the Piedmont quillwort, is a species of quillwort. It is critically endangered.

== Distribution ==
It is found in Italy. There is a breeding program to aid conservation.

== Taxonomy ==
It was named by Vincenzo de Cesati and Giuseppe De Notaris, in Index Seminum (GE, Genuensis) 1858: 36 in 1858.
