= Isoetes nuttallii =

Conservation status
- Least Concern (IUCN 3.1)

Scientific classification
- Kingdom: Plantae
- Clade: Tracheophytes
- Clade: Lycophytes
- Class: Lycopodiopsida
- Order: Isoetales
- Family: Isoetaceae
- Genus: Isoetes
- Species: I. nuttallii

Binomial name
- Isoetes nuttallii A.Braun ex Engelm.

Synonyms
- Calamaria nuttallii (A.Braun) Kuntze; Calamaria suksdorfii (Baker) Kuntze; Isoetes opaca Nutt. ex Engelm. Isoetes suksdorfii Baker

Western North American species of quillwort

Isoetes nuttallii, or Nuttall's quillwort, is a species of quillwort, a type of lycopod. It is native to shallow waters and other wet habitats of western North America from British Columbia to California. It produces up to 60 pointed, cylindrical, green to gray-green leaves, each 7 to 17 centimeters long. The velum completely covers the spherical sporangia, which are 5 millimeters long and 1.5 millimeters wide. The ligule is small and triangular. The megaspores are 400 to 500 micrometers in diameter. The microspores, which are spiny and covered in tubercles, are 28 to 31 micrometers long.
