= Isoetes olympica =

Conservation status
- Critically Endangered (IUCN 3.1)

Scientific classification
- Kingdom: Plantae
- Clade: Tracheophytes
- Clade: Lycophytes
- Class: Lycopodiopsida
- Order: Isoetales
- Family: Isoetaceae
- Genus: Isoetes
- Species: I. olympica

Binomial name
- Isoetes olympica A.Braun

Western Asian species of quillwort

Isoetes olympica, the Olympic quillwort, is a lycophyte in the family Isoetaceae. The IUCN has classified the species as critically endangered. It was named by Alexander Braun in 1867.

== Distribution ==
The species is native to Turkey and Syria.
