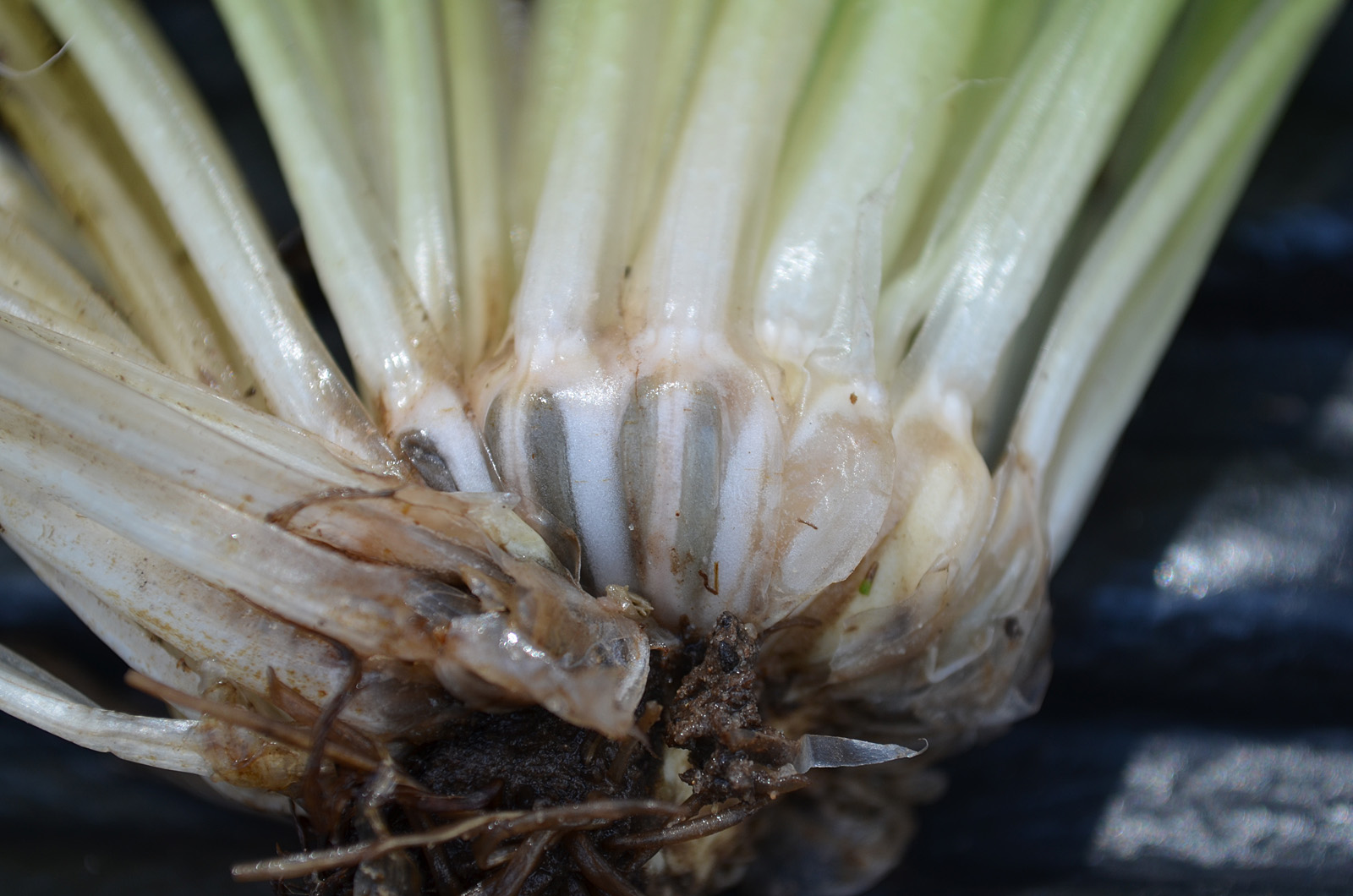

Scientific classification
- Kingdom: Plantae
- Clade: Tracheophytes
- Clade: Lycophytes
- Class: Lycopodiopsida
- Order: Isoetales
- Family: Isoetaceae
- Genus: Isoetes
- Species: I. mississippiensis

Binomial name
- Isoetes mississippiensis S.W.Leonard & W.C.Taylor & Musselman & R.D.Bray

= Isoetes mississippiensis =

Mississippi quillwort

Mississippian endemic species of quillwort

Isoetes mississippiensis, the Mississippi quillwort, is a small aquatic pteridophyte from the family Isoetaceae.

== Distribution and habitat ==
The species can be found in the southern part of Mississippi in the tributaries of the Pearl River. Isoetes mississippiensis occurs in persistent, sluggish streams in the southern part of Mississippi. Other plants that occupy the same habitat include the graminoids such as rushes and panicgrass. Isoetes mississippiensis only occurs in two known locations, neither of which is in a protected area.

== Description ==
The rootstock of Isoetes mississippiensis is brown, bilobed, subglobose, and measures between 0.5 and 1.0 cm long and 1.0-1.5 cm wide. The sporophylls are a bright green which darkens with age and becomes pale towards the base. The sporophylls are also spirally arranged and can grow to 40 cm long and 2.0mm wide at the mid-length. Its sporangium are ovate, with most being between 4-10mm long and 4-5mm wide. It is distinct from other Isoetes species due to it having a chromosome count of 2n=22, the presence of laevigate megaspore ornamentation, and the differences of its habitat in comparison to similar species in the genus.
