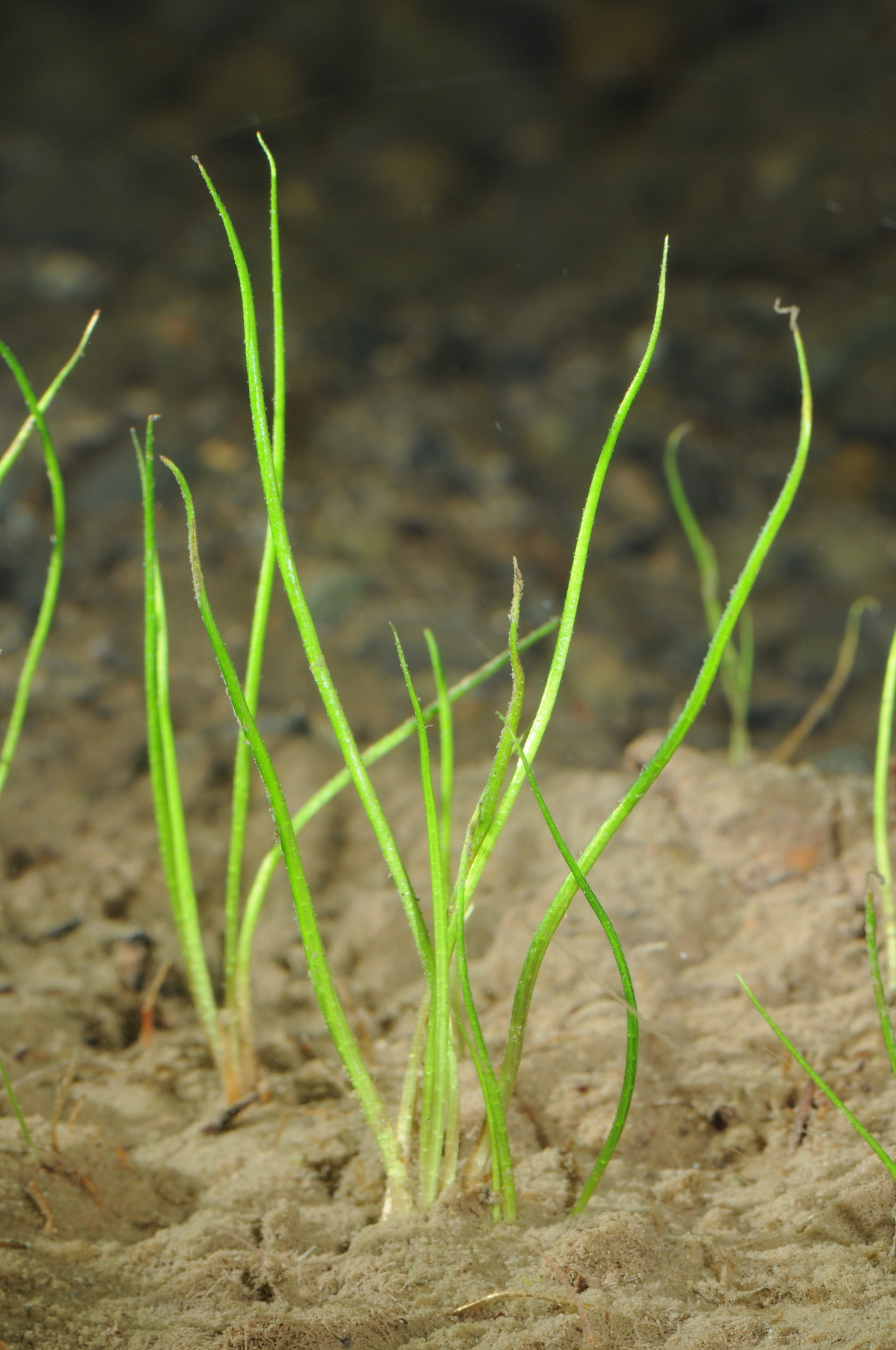

Conservation status
- Apparently Secure (NatureServe)

Scientific classification
- Kingdom: Plantae
- Clade: Tracheophytes
- Clade: Lycophytes
- Class: Lycopodiopsida
- Order: Isoetales
- Family: Isoetaceae
- Genus: Isoetes
- Species: I. bolanderi

Binomial name
- Isoetes bolanderi Engelm.

= Isoetes bolanderi =

North American species of quillwort

Isoetes bolanderi, or Bolander's quillwort, is a species of quillwort, a type of lycophyte. This aquatic plant is native to high altitude regions of the western United States and southern Alberta. It grows almost entirely underwater in lakes and other water bodies from a corm-like stem, which remains buried in the mud, producing up to twenty pointed, cylindrical leaves approaching 15 centimeters in maximum length. It reproduces via spherical sporangia, covered about one third by the velum. The ligule is small and heart-shaped. The megaspores are white, though sometimes bluish, and 350 to 290 micrometers in diameter. The microspores are 25 to 30 micrometers long.

Isoetes bolanderi is a submerged lycophyte that can dominate the shallow littoral flora of high-elevation Sierra Nevada lakes; field studies documented persistent summer biomass and elevation-related differences in plant size and corm allocation. Like many species of Isoetes, it performs aquatic crassulacean acid metabolism (CAM), which concentrates CO₂ for daytime photosynthesis underwater and reduces photorespiration.
