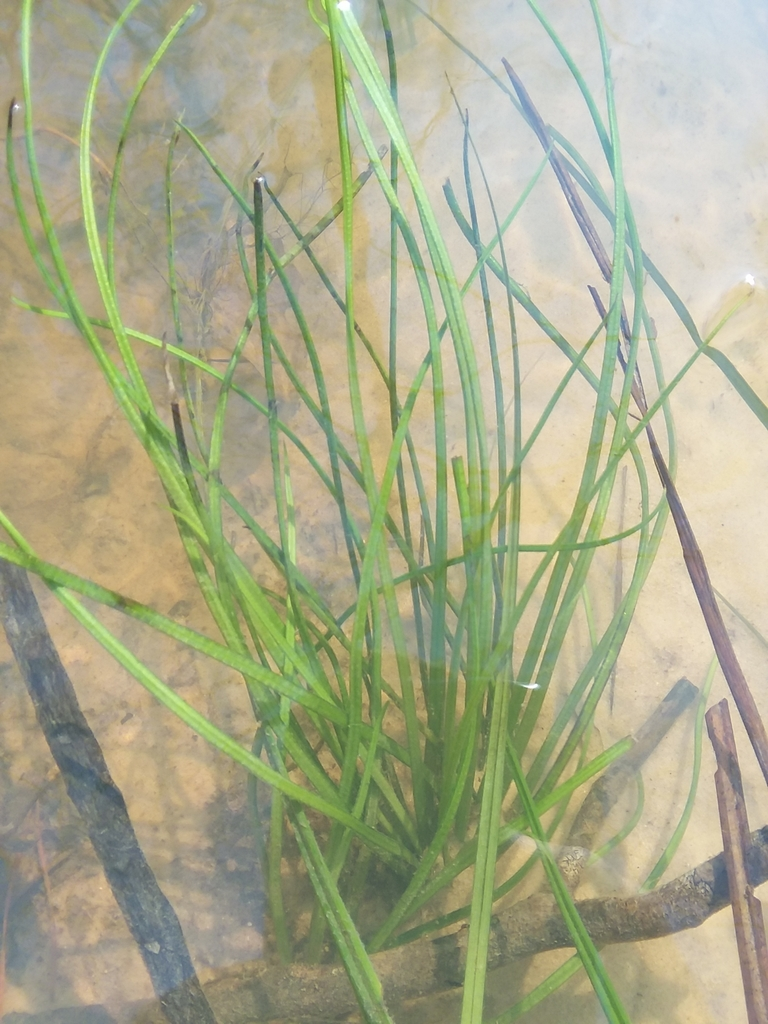

Conservation status
- Imperiled (NatureServe)

Scientific classification
- Kingdom: Plantae
- Clade: Tracheophytes
- Clade: Lycophytes
- Class: Lycopodiopsida
- Order: Isoetales
- Family: Isoetaceae
- Genus: Isoetes
- Species: I. louisianensis

Binomial name
- Isoetes louisianensis Thieret
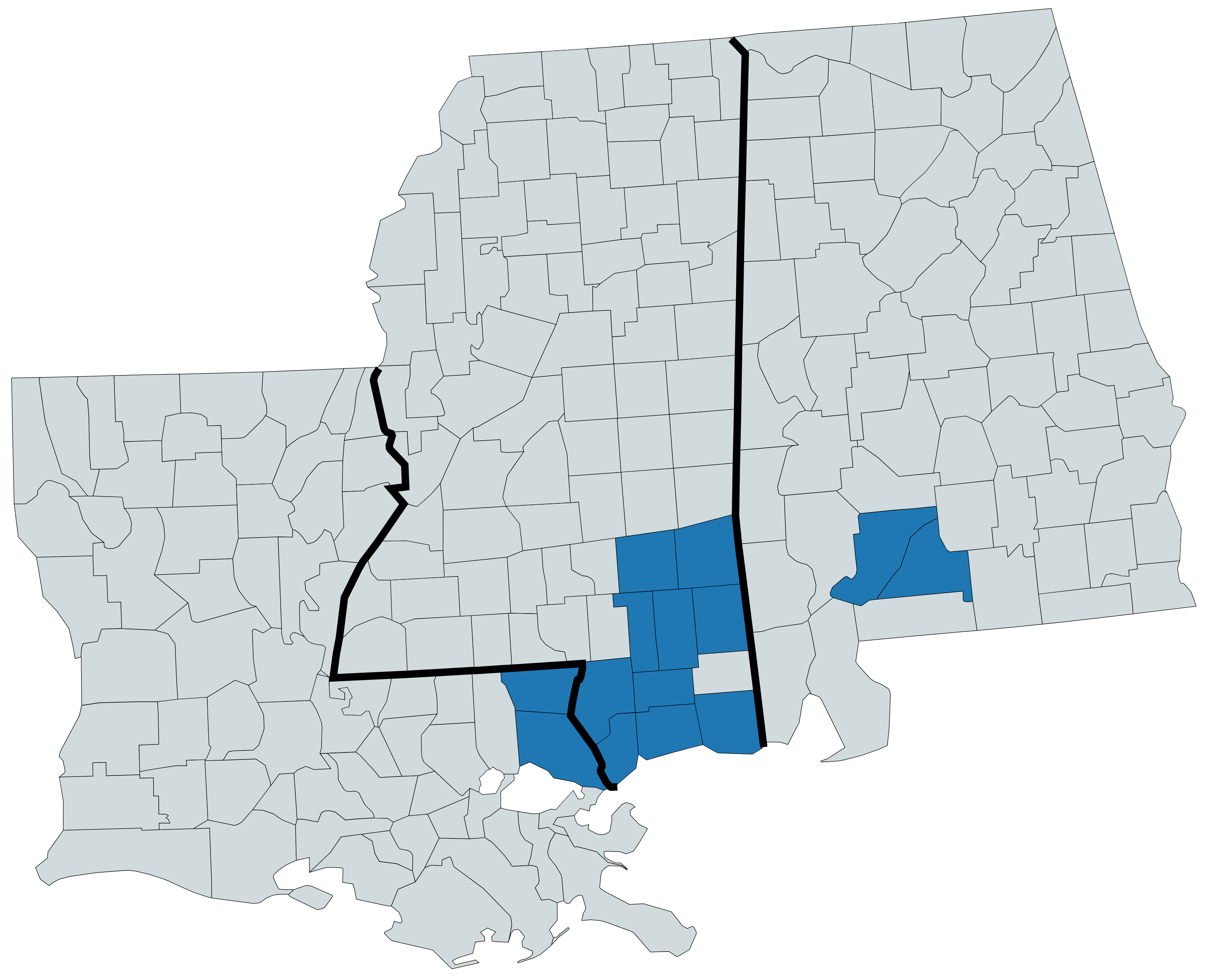
- Range of Isoetes louisianensis

= Isoetes louisianensis =

Southeastern US species of quillwort

Isoetes louisianensis, the Louisiana quillwort, is a small, grass-like aquatic plant of the family Isoetaceae. It is "one of the rarest quillworts in North America." It occurs in only five locations in St. Tammany and Washington Parishes of Louisiana, as well as some spots in southern Mississippi and south-central Alabama. It is federally listed as an endangered species, partly due to its highly restricted range.

The Louisiana quillwort occurs predominantly on sand and gravel bars on small to medium-sized streams. These plants live for periods underwater. They are regularly inundated as much as 50 centimeters (20 inches) following rains, and may be inundated for long periods in wet seasons. Its habitat follows roughly along the Bogue Chitto River. Associated plants include primrose-leafed violet (Viola primulifolia), bulrush (Scirpus divaricatus), water-willow (Justicia lanceolata), yellow-star grass (Hypoxis leptocarpa), yellow-eyed grass Xyris sp. and sedge (Carex sp.), swamp tupelo (Nyssa sylvatica var. biflora), water tupelo (Nyssa aquatica), sweetbay (Magnolia virginiana), bald cypress (Taxodium distichum), swamp laurel oak (Quercus obtusa), red maple (Acer rubrum), loblolly (Pinus taeda), ti ti (Cyrilla racemiflora), fetterbush (Lyonia lucida), and winterberry (Ilex verticillata).

Distinctive characteristics of this species include brown-spotted sporangial walls and megaspores with highly reticulate ridges, producing a spiny effect. The leaves are up to 40 cm long.

The Louisiana quillwort was described recently, in 1973, and was listed as an endangered species in 1992.
