= Isoetes × eatonii =

Scientific classification
- Kingdom: Plantae
- Clade: Tracheophytes
- Clade: Lycophytes
- Class: Lycopodiopsida
- Order: Isoetales
- Family: Isoetaceae
- Genus: Isoetes
- Species: I. × eatonii

Binomial name
- Isoetes × eatonii Dodge

Synonyms
- Isoetes gravesii A.A. Eat.

Species of spore-bearing plant

Isoetes × eatonii, or Eaton's quillwort, is a hybrid between I. engelmannii and I. tenella. It can be found in ponds and slow moving rivers in Canada or in several New England states. In Canada, it has only been found in the Severn River in Ontario. In the United States, it has been found in Pennsylvania, New Jersey, and New York. It bears 12-100 long yellowish green leaves, each fine, soft, and 8 to 45 centimeters long. The unspotted tan colored sporangium are 12 millimeters long and 5 millimeters wide. The velum covers a sixth to a quarter of the sporangium. The elongated ligule is 3.5 millimeters long. The flattened white megaspores are 320 to 530 micrometers in diameter and bear short spiny ridges. The round microspores are 22 to 25 micrometers long.
