= Isoetes araucaniana =

Scientific classification
- Kingdom: Plantae
- Clade: Embryophytes
- Clade: Tracheophytes
- Clade: Lycophytes
- Class: Lycopodiopsida
- Order: Isoetales
- Family: Isoetaceae
- Genus: Isoetes
- Species: I. araucaniana

Binomial name
- Isoetes araucaniana Macluf & Hickey

Species of plant

Isoetes araucaniana is a species of aquatic lycophyte in the family Isoetaceae. It is endemic to Chile, distributed between the Biobio and Araucania regions. It was discovered in Nahuelbuta National Park.
