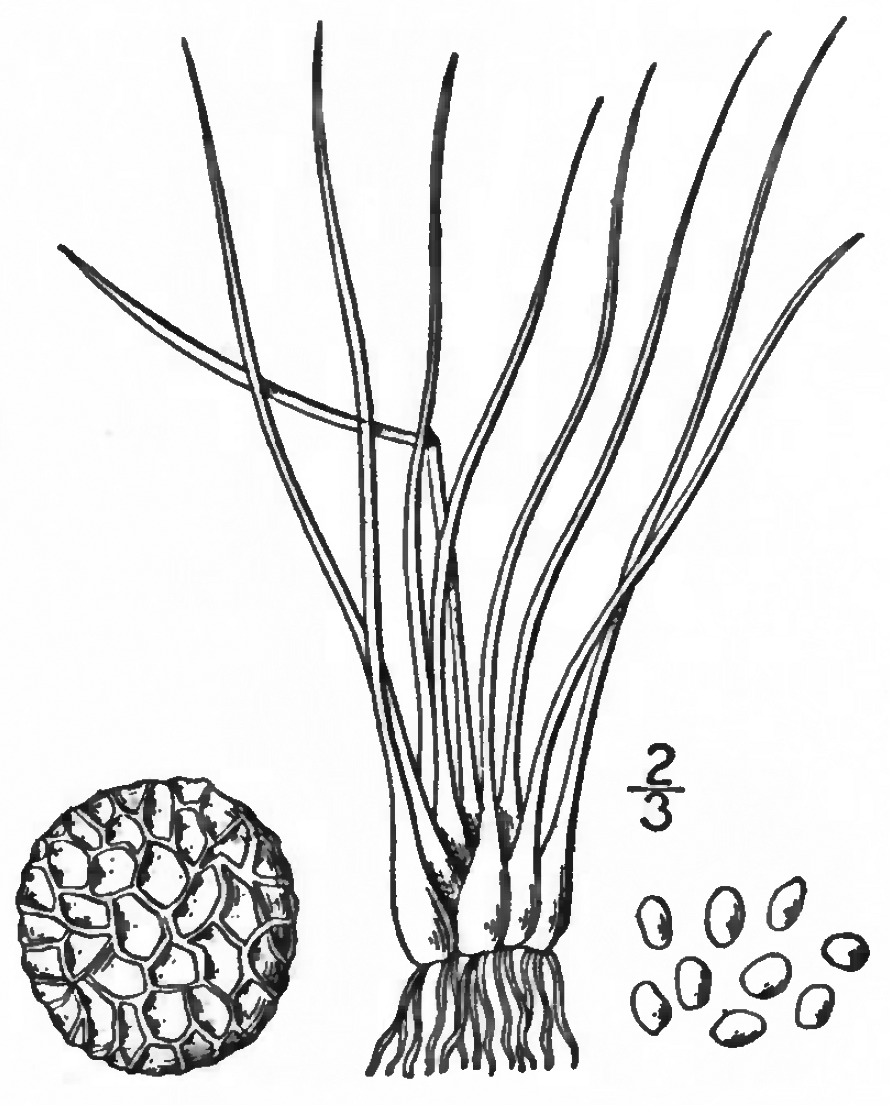

Conservation status
- Least Concern (IUCN 3.1)

Scientific classification
- Kingdom: Plantae
- Clade: Tracheophytes
- Clade: Lycophytes
- Class: Lycopodiopsida
- Order: Isoetales
- Family: Isoetaceae
- Genus: Isoetes
- Species: I. tuckermanii

Binomial name
- Isoetes tuckermanii A.Braun ex Engelm.

Synonyms
- Calamaria tuckermanii (A.Braun ex Engelm.) Kuntze; Isoetes tuckermanii var. borealis A.A.Eaton

= Isoetes tuckermanii =

Species of plant in the family Isoetaceae

Isoetes tuckermanii, or Tuckerman's quillwort, is a tetraploid species of plant in the family Isoetaceae. It can be found in shallow water in Newfoundland, Nova Scotia, New Brunswick, and south through the New England states to Maryland. It bears 10 to 45 long bright green to yellow green leaves that are 4 to 25 centimeters long, usually erect, but sometimes recurved. The velum covers one fourth or less of the sporangium, which is usually unspotted, 5 millimeters long, and 3 millimeters wide. The white spherical megaspores are 400 to 650 micrometers in diameter, and bear rough-crested ridges that form a hexagonal honeycomb shape. The kidney shaped microspores are 24 to 33 micrometers long, bearing tubercles. It is very similar to I. macrospora, only reliably distinguishable by cytology or through careful megaspore measurement.
