= Isoetes sinensis =

Conservation status
- Critically endangered, possibly extinct (IUCN 3.1)

Scientific classification
- Kingdom: Plantae
- Clade: Tracheophytes
- Clade: Lycophytes
- Class: Lycopodiopsida
- Order: Isoetales
- Family: Isoetaceae
- Genus: Isoetes
- Species: I. sinensis

Binomial name
- Isoetes sinensis T.C. Palmer

Eastern Asian species of quillwort

Isoetes sinensis, the narrow quillwort, is a species of plant in the family Isoetaceae.

== Information ==
Isoetes sinensis is native to China and Korea. Its natural habitat is swamps. It is threatened by habitat loss. In China, this species is native to the areas of Anhui, Jiangsu, and Zhejiang.

== Conservation ==
Isoetes sinensis is recorded to be a critically endangered species due to industrial development and agricultural expansion. This species occupies freshwater environments and within terrestrial systems. In order to help conserve this species, amplified fragment length polymorphisms (AFLPs) were used to research the genetic variation of it and the population structure of seven extant populations of the species. This investigation helped provide useful data for creating conservation strategies to help preserve the species.
