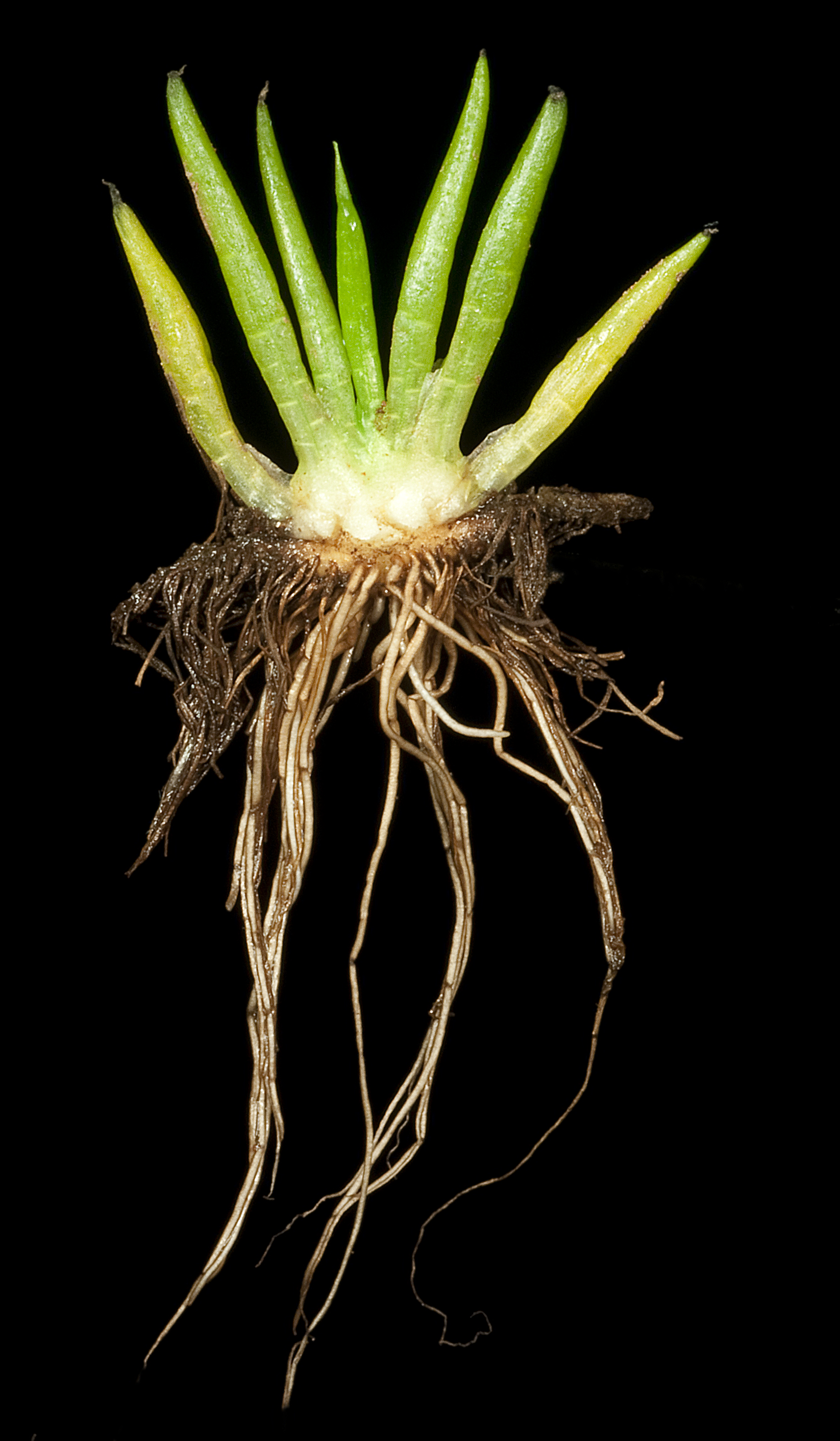

Scientific classification
- Kingdom: Plantae
- Clade: Tracheophytes
- Clade: Lycophytes
- Class: Lycopodiopsida
- Order: Isoetales
- Family: Isoetaceae
- Genus: Isoetes
- Species: I. australis

Binomial name
- Isoetes australis S.Williams

= Isoetes australis =

Western Australian species of quillwort

Isoetes australis is quillwort (in the family, Isoetaceae) and was first described in 1943 by Samuel Williams.

It is endemic to south-west Western Australia, where it is found in ephemeral pools on granite outcrops. The plants begin to grow during winter when the pools fill with water and die back completely when the water dries up (late spring / summer).
