= Isoetes orcuttii =

Scientific classification
- Kingdom: Plantae
- Clade: Tracheophytes
- Clade: Lycophytes
- Class: Lycopodiopsida
- Order: Isoetales
- Family: Isoetaceae
- Genus: Isoetes
- Species: I. orcuttii

Binomial name
- Isoetes orcuttii A.A.Eaton

Species of plant

Isoetes orcuttii is a quillwort species native to California. It is cormous, 3-6 centimeters tall and 0.2-0.4 millimeters in diameter with 3-25 leaves. It is found in vernal pools at lower elevations.
