= Isoetes eludens =

Scientific classification
- Kingdom: Plantae
- Clade: Tracheophytes
- Clade: Lycophytes
- Class: Lycopodiopsida
- Order: Isoetales
- Family: Isoetaceae
- Genus: Isoetes
- Species: I. eludens

Binomial name
- Isoetes eludens J.P.Roux, Hopper & Rhian J.Sm.

South African endemic species of quillwort

Isoetes eludens is an aquatic plant in the genus commonly known as quillwort that is native to the Kamiesberg Mountains in Namaqualand, South Africa. So far it is known to grow only in a single !gau (gnamma), a small temporary pool formed in a hollowed out area of granite rock. It has likely been growing in that region for millions of years, but was only discovered in 2007 and described in 2009. The specific epithet eludens refers to the fact that it eluded discovery, in spite of several searches in recent years in the area for new quillwort species.

== Description ==
The genus Isoetes, the quillworts, are most closely related to Selaginellas, with fossils morphologically similar to extant species dating back more than 150 million years. Isoetes eludens grows only 6 cm (2.4 in) tall, with root hairs growing 5 mm (0.20 in) under the soil surface. It has up to twelve green sporophylls, or leaves that produce spores, growing in a tight cluster. Like other quillworts, the sporophylls are hollow and rounded like a quill. The spore-producing part of the leaf is at the base, producing both megaspores and microspores.

== Distribution and habitat ==
Isoetes eludens was found in a single !gau, or seasonal rock pool, that is 2 m (6.6 ft) wide and 15 cm (5.9 in) deep. The pool is on a granite gneiss ridge at 1,284 m (4,213 ft) elevation in the Kamiesberg Mountains, Namaqualand, South Africa. Most quillworts are found growing in permanent lakes or bogs, with a few rare species growing in temporary pools. Isoetes eludens has the ability to survive during dry periods as dormant spores, or during damp periods with corms or submerged stems under the mud.

== Conservation ==
There is no conservation rating given by the IUCN for Isoetes eludens—Kew Botanical Gardens officials are recommending it be classified as Vulnerable. Further exploration has not turned up any more instances of the plant growing in the region, outside of the one rock pool. If the only location is the one site, then it could be threatened by a single human impact. However, the pool is in a remote area with little vegetation, so it is not as threatened by the more common impacts such as sheep grazing and other human activities. Climate change is also a possible threat to the plant's survival, though the fact that it has survived previous climate changes over millennia indicates that it has the ability to endure extreme climate events.
