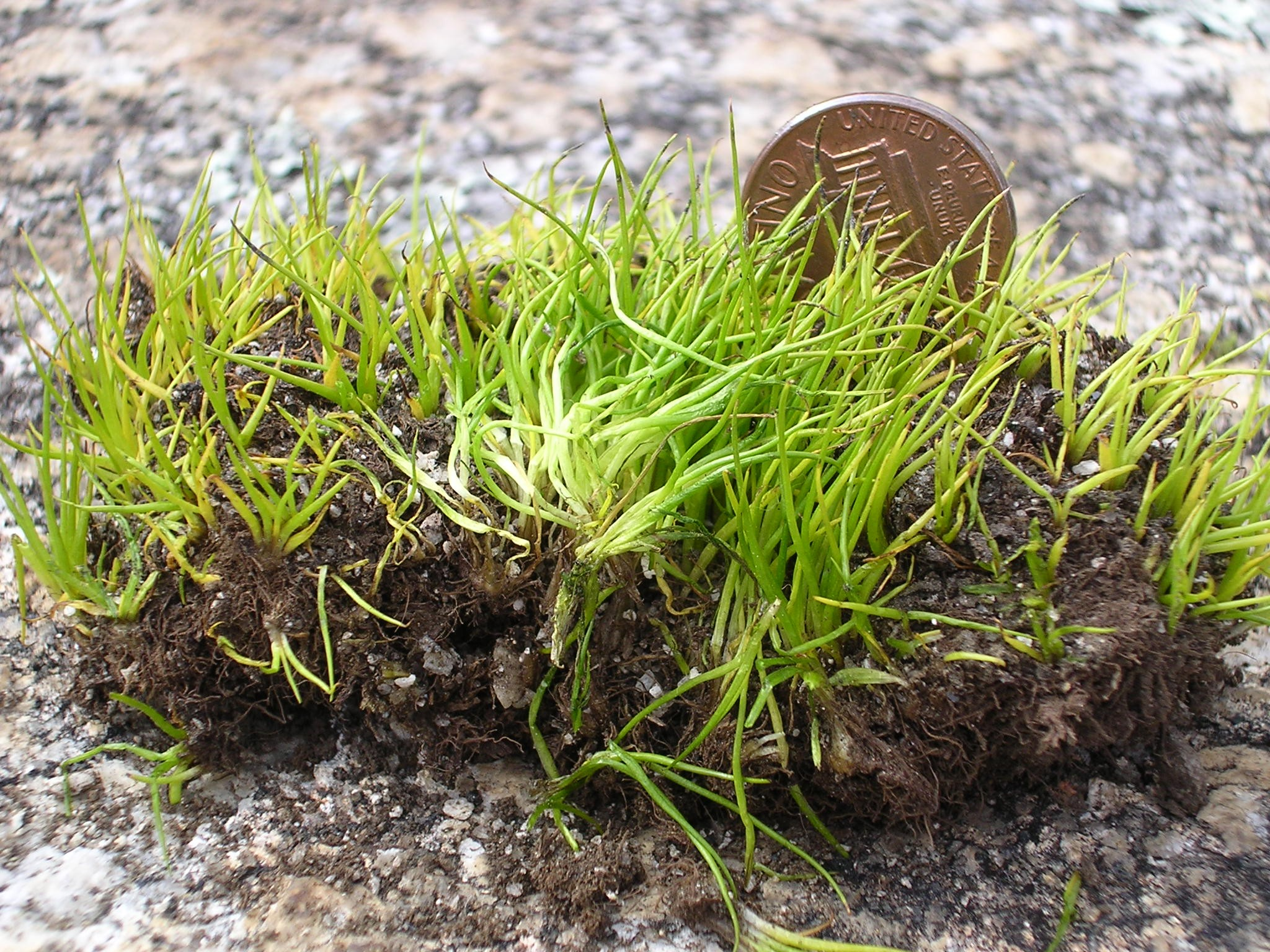

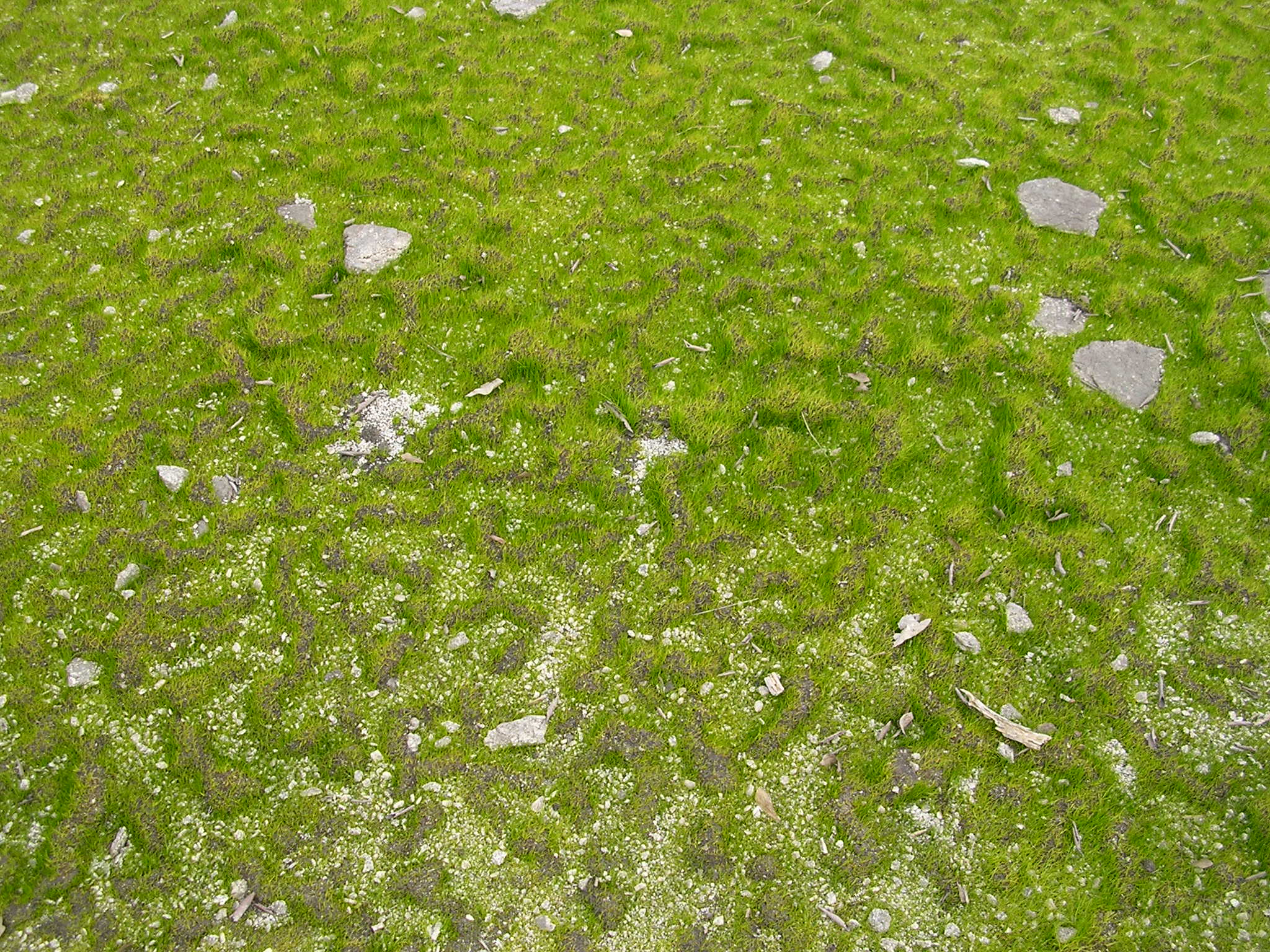

Conservation status
- Critically Imperiled (NatureServe)

Scientific classification
- Kingdom: Plantae
- Clade: Tracheophytes
- Clade: Lycophytes
- Class: Lycopodiopsida
- Order: Isoetales
- Family: Isoetaceae
- Genus: Isoetes
- Species: I. tegetiformans

Binomial name
- Isoetes tegetiformans Rury

= Isoetes tegetiformans =

Species of spore-bearing plant

Isoetes tegetiformans, commonly known as mat-forming quillwort or mat-forming Merlin's grass, is an aquatic lycophyte endemic to the U.S. state of Georgia. It grows exclusively in shallow, temporary pools on granite outcrops, often with only 2 cm of soil. Only 7 populations are known to exist, and three of these have been destroyed since the plant's discovery in 1976. The remaining populations are threatened with habitat destruction due to quarrying, though the species is protected under the U.S. Endangered Species Act. New leaves quickly sprout after fall and winter rains, but during the dry summer months these typically shrivel.
