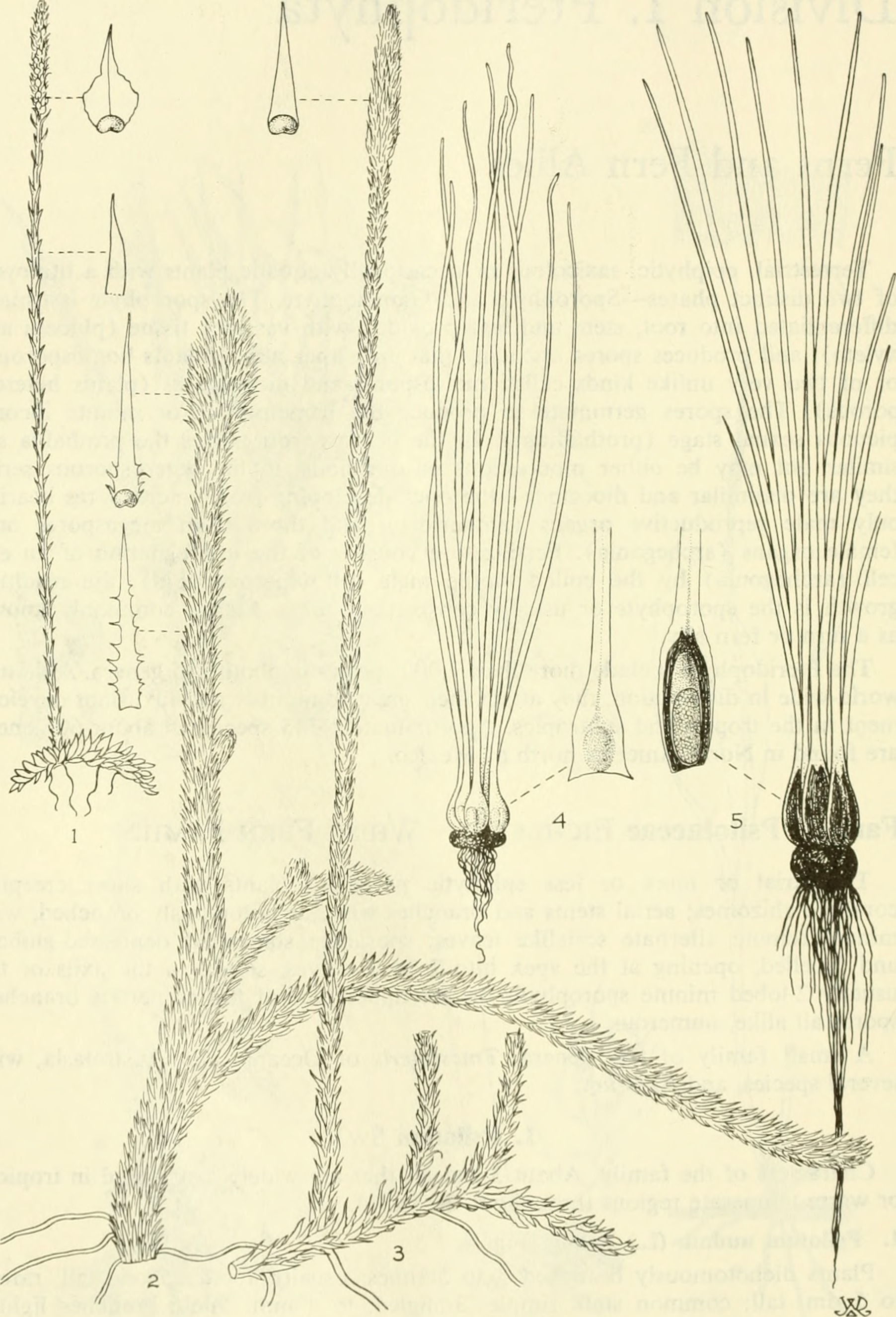

Scientific classification
- Kingdom: Plantae
- Clade: Tracheophytes
- Clade: Lycophytes
- Class: Lycopodiopsida
- Order: Isoetales
- Family: Isoetaceae
- Genus: Isoetes
- Species: I. melanopoda

Binomial name
- Isoetes melanopoda J.Gay & Durieu

Synonyms
- Calamaria melanopoda (J.Gay & Durieu) Kuntze

= Isoetes melanopoda =

Temperate North American species of quillwort

Isoetes melanopoda is a species of nonflowering vascular plant belonging to the quillworts in the family Isoetaceae. Its common names include: black-footed quillwort, midland quillwort, and prairie quillwort.

== Description ==
Isoetes melanopoda is a grass-like perennial, but often short lived, growing up to 40 cm tall with an ephemeral growth period. The deciduous bright green leaves are linear (quill-like), with black bases. Each mature leaf has a single sporangium, producing both male spores (microspores) and female spores (megaspores).

Isoetes melanopoda has a discontinuous range within the Midwest, Eastern, and Southern states of the US, the populations are often disjunct and often found in uncommon microhabitats. It is listed as an endangered species in Minnesota, where it is found in the southwestern edge of the state growing in shallow seepage pools with water draining from layers of Sioux quartzite or pools formed by rain. The plants grow on rocky outcrops in soil pockets in pools of water or at the edges of pools where soil has accumulated. It is also listed as endangered in the states of Indiana, Iowa, Kentucky, New Jersey, and Tennessee.
