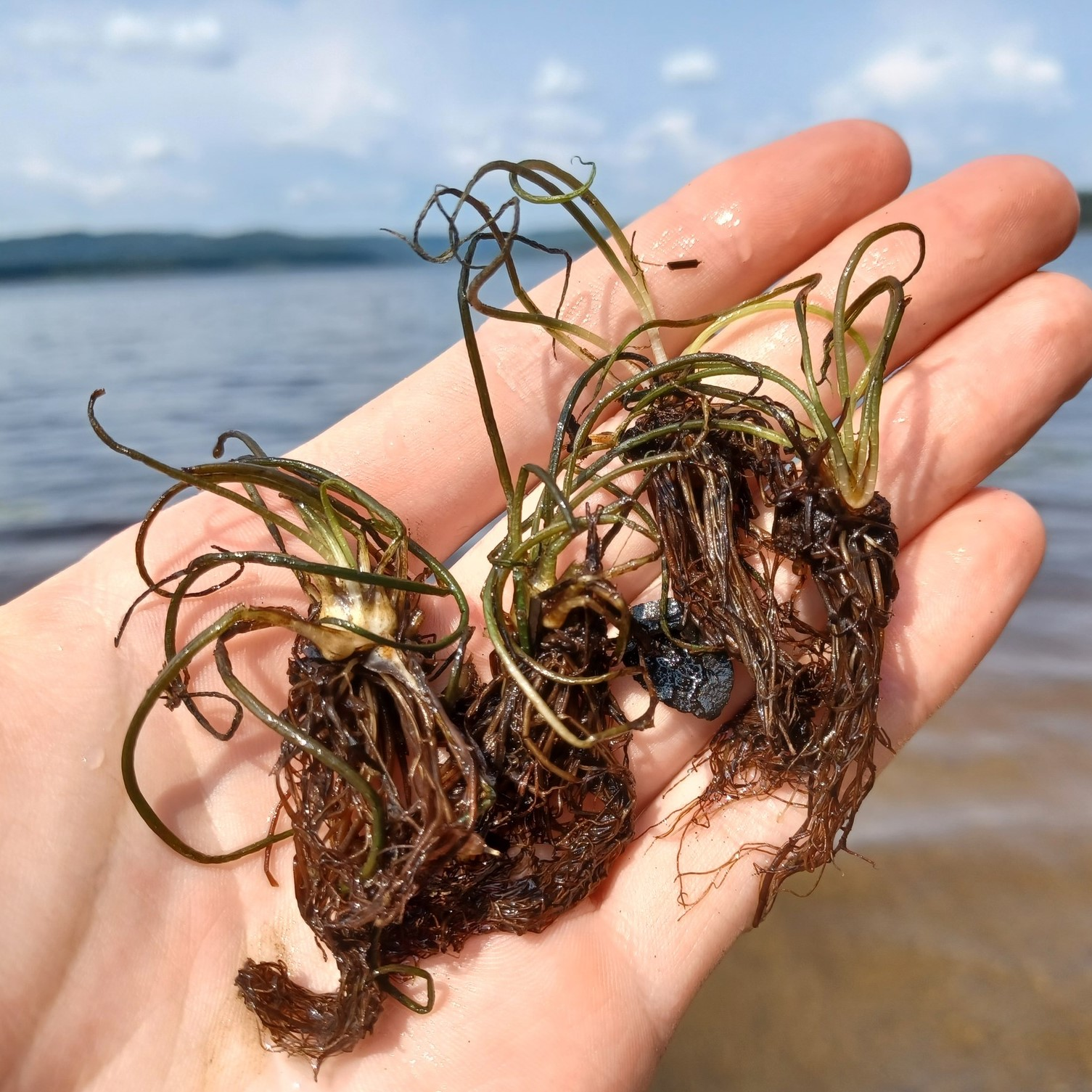

Scientific classification
- Kingdom: Plantae
- Clade: Tracheophytes
- Clade: Lycophytes
- Class: Lycopodiopsida
- Order: Isoetales
- Family: Isoetaceae
- Genus: Isoetes
- Species: I. macrospora

Binomial name
- Isoetes macrospora Durieu

Synonyms
- Isoetes heterospora A.A. Eat.

= Isoetes macrospora =

Species of spore-bearing plant

Isoetes macrospora, commonly known as big-spore quillwort, is a species of flowering plant in the family Isoetaceae. It can be found in the deep water of low nutrient lakes on the Canadian Shield in Newfoundland, Nova Scotia, Quebec, and Ontario. In the United States, it has been found in Minnesota and south, through the Appalachian Mountains to Virginia.

== Description ==
Isoetes macrospora bears 3 to 17 long, stiff dark green leaves, sometimes with recurving tips. The sporangium can be 5 millimeters long and 4 millimeters wide, covered from one sixth to one quarter by the velum. The triangular ligule can grow up to 2 millimeters long. The spherical, white megaspores are 400 to 800 micrometers in diameter, and bear ridges that form honeycomb-like areas. The kidney-shaped microspores are 32 to 50 micrometers long, each with evenly spaced smooth papillae.
