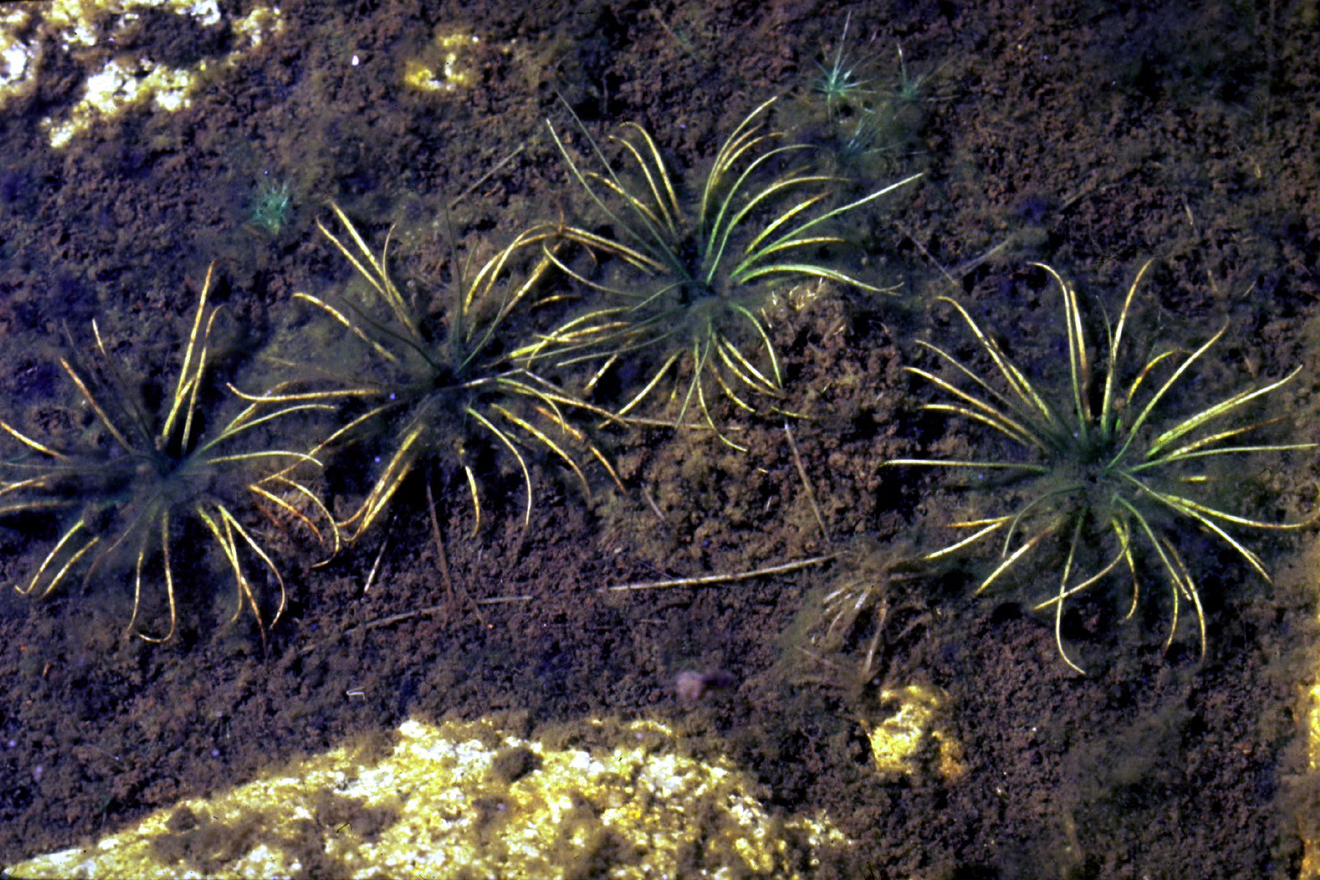

Conservation status
- Least Concern (IUCN 3.1)

Scientific classification
- Kingdom: Plantae
- Clade: Tracheophytes
- Clade: Lycophytes
- Class: Lycopodiopsida
- Order: Isoetales
- Family: Isoetaceae
- Genus: Isoetes
- Species: I. echinospora

Binomial name
- Isoetes echinospora Durieu

Synonyms
- Homotypic Synonyms: Isoetes lacustris subsp. echinospora (Durieu) T.Moore & More; Heterotypic Synonyms: Isoetes echinospora subf. angusstivelata Iversen; Isoetes echinospora subf. angustivelata Iversen; Isoetes lacustris var. longifolia Motelay & Vendryès

= Isoetes echinospora =

Temperate Northern Hemisphere species of quillwort

Isoetes echinospora is a species of lycophyte in the family Isoetaceae. It is sometimes referred to by the common names spiny quillwort, spiny-spored quillwort or spring quillwort

It is an abundant species in Canada. It can be found in shallow aquatic environments from Labrador and Newfoundland to Alaska, and south to Pennsylvania, Wisconsin, Michigan, Colorado, and California. In Germany it is found in only two locations: the Feldsee and Lake Titisee, both in the High Black Forest.

It bears 10–30 green to yellow leaves and a two-lobed corm. The velum covers one to three quarters of the sporangium, which are 10 millimetres (0.39 in) long. Round white megaspores are about 480 micrometres (0.019 in) in diameter and are covered with spines. Kidney-shaped microspores are about 26 micrometres (0.0010 in) long with smooth, fine spines. European populations of the plant lack the stomata present in North American populations.

Isoetes muricata and Isoetes echinospora var. braunii refer to the North American plants, but are often considered synonyms of Europe's I. exhinospora.
