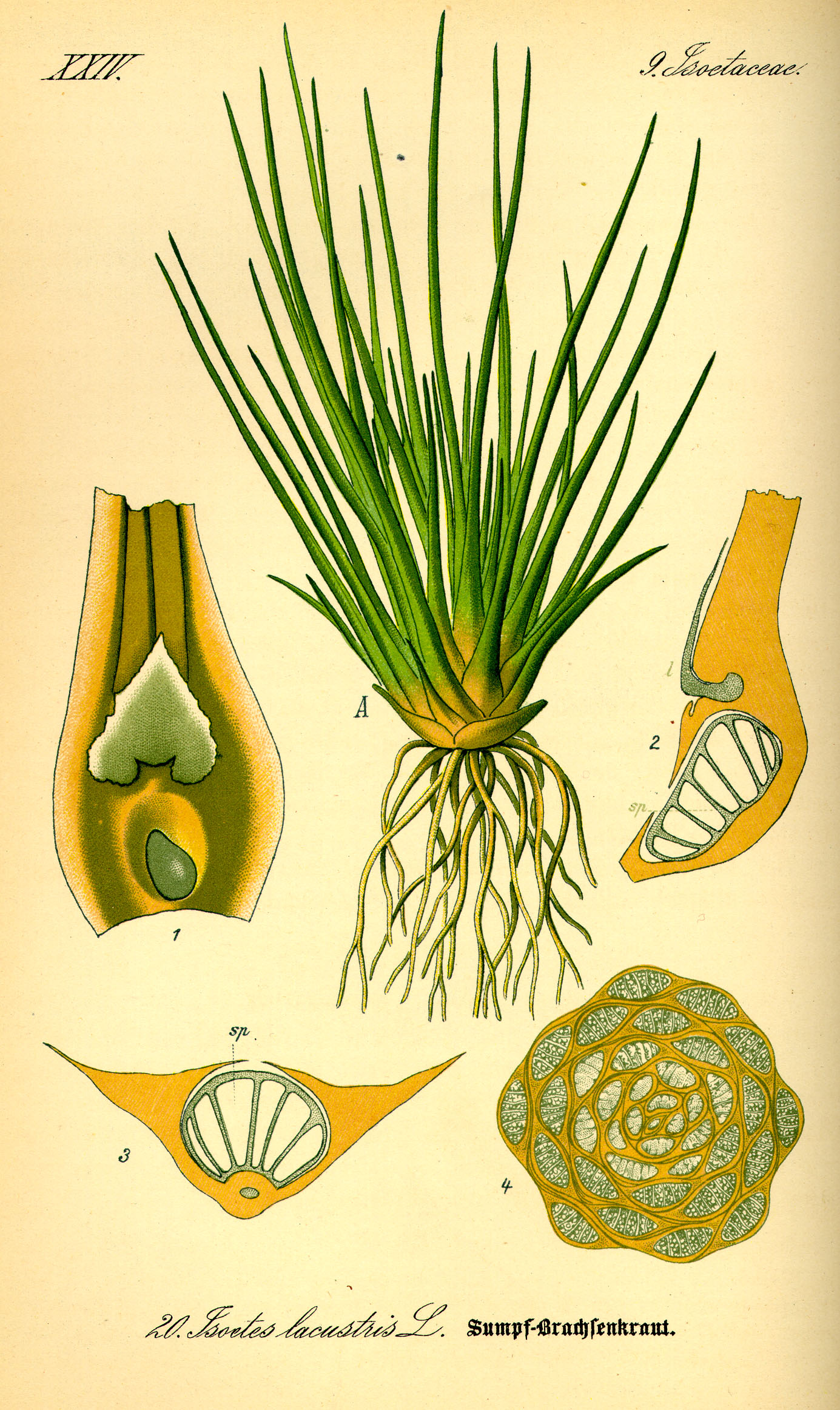

Conservation status
- Secure (NatureServe)

Scientific classification
- Kingdom: Plantae
- Clade: Tracheophytes
- Clade: Lycophytes
- Class: Lycopodiopsida
- Order: Isoetales
- Family: Isoetaceae
- Genus: Isoetes
- Species: I. lacustris

Binomial name
- Isoetes lacustris L.

Synonyms
- Calamaria lacustris (L.) Kuntze; Isoetes heterospora A.A.Eaton; Isoetes hieroglyphica A.A.Eaton; Isoetes macrospora Durieu; Isoetes macrospora Durieu forma hieroglyphica (A.A.Eaton) N.Pfeiff.; Isoetes macrospora Durieu var. heterospora (A.A. Eaton) A.A.Eaton; Isoëtes tuckermanii A.Braun ex Engelm. var. heterospora (A.A.Eaton) Clute

= Isoetes lacustris =

Circumpolar species of quillwort

Isoetes lacustris, the lake quillwort or Merlin's grass, is a boreal quillwort native on both sides of the northern Atlantic Ocean. In Europe, it is distributed from Poland west to northeastern France, throughout Scandinavia, the west and north of the British Isles, the Faroe Islands and Iceland. Further south, isolated populations occur in the glacial lakes of the Pirin mountain range in Bulgaria.
