= Augusta Vera Duthie =

South African botanist and academic (1881–1963)

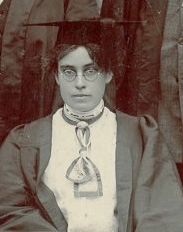
- Augusta V. Duthie
- Born: 18 July 1881; Belvidere, Knysna
- Died: 8 August 1963 (aged 82); Belvidere, Knysna
- Education: South African College; University of South Africa
- Scientific career
- Fields: botanist
- Workplaces: Victoria College
- Author abbrev. (botany): A.V.Duthie

Augusta Vera Duthie (18 July 1881 Belvidere, Knysna – 8 August 1963 Belvidere, Knysna) was a South African botanist who studied the plants of the Western Cape and was a popular teacher who lectured on cryptogamic botany. She was the first university lecturer in botany who was entirely educated in South Africa. The standard author abbreviation A.V.Duthie is used to indicate this person as the author when citing a botanical name.

== Early life and education ==
One of five children, she was born to Archibald Hamilton and Augusta Vera Duthie and in Knysna, South Africa. She obtained a B.A. from Huguenot College in 1901, a M.A. from South African College in 1910, and a D.Sc. from University of South Africa in 1929.

== Academic career ==
She was appointed as botany lecturer at Victoria College, now University of Stellenbosch in 1902. In 1912, she visited Cambridge University and worked with Albert Seward. In 1929, she completed flora of the Stellenbosch Flats, an alluvial area surrounding the college. After her retirement 1939, she returned to manage her family farm Belvidere where she died in 1963. In her will she bequeathed a sum of money to St Andrew's College, where she had taught, in order to fund scholarships.

== Eponyms ==
- Duthiastrum
- Duthie's golden mole Chlorotalpa duthieae Broom
- Impatiens duthieae
- Ischyrolepis duthieae (Pillans) H. P. Linder
- Ornithogalum duthiae
- Psilocaulon duthieae
- Romulea duthieae
- Ruschia duthiae
- Stomatium duthieae

== Major works ==
Vegetation and Flora of the Stellenbosch Flats with List of Vascular Cryptogams and Flowering Plants Found in that Area. Pretoria: University of South Africa. 1900.

== Commemoration ==
She is commemorated by the stained glass window in the north wall of the Holy Trinity Church in Belvidere near Knysna, the church was founded by her ancestor, Thomas Henry Duthie.
