= Chaloneriaceae =

Chaloneriaceae Temporal range: Pennsylvanian, ~Late Pennsylvanian–Middle Pennsylvanian

Scientific classification
- Kingdom: Plantae
- Clade: Tracheophytes
- Clade: Lycophytes
- Class: Lycopodiopsida
- Order: Isoetales
- Family: †Chaloneriaceae; Pigg & Rothwell (1983)

Genera
- †Bodeodendron; †Chaloneria; †Polysporia; †Sporangiostrobus; †Cormophyton

Extinct family of spore-bearing plants

Chaloneriaceae is an extinct family of heterosporous lycophyte in the order Isoetales. They are significant in that they feature lobed rooting bases despite dating to the Pennsylvanian, suggesting that lycophytes with similar rooting systems developed contemporaneously with arborescent lepidodendrids which have stigmarian rooting systems rather than deriving from them as had previously been thought.
