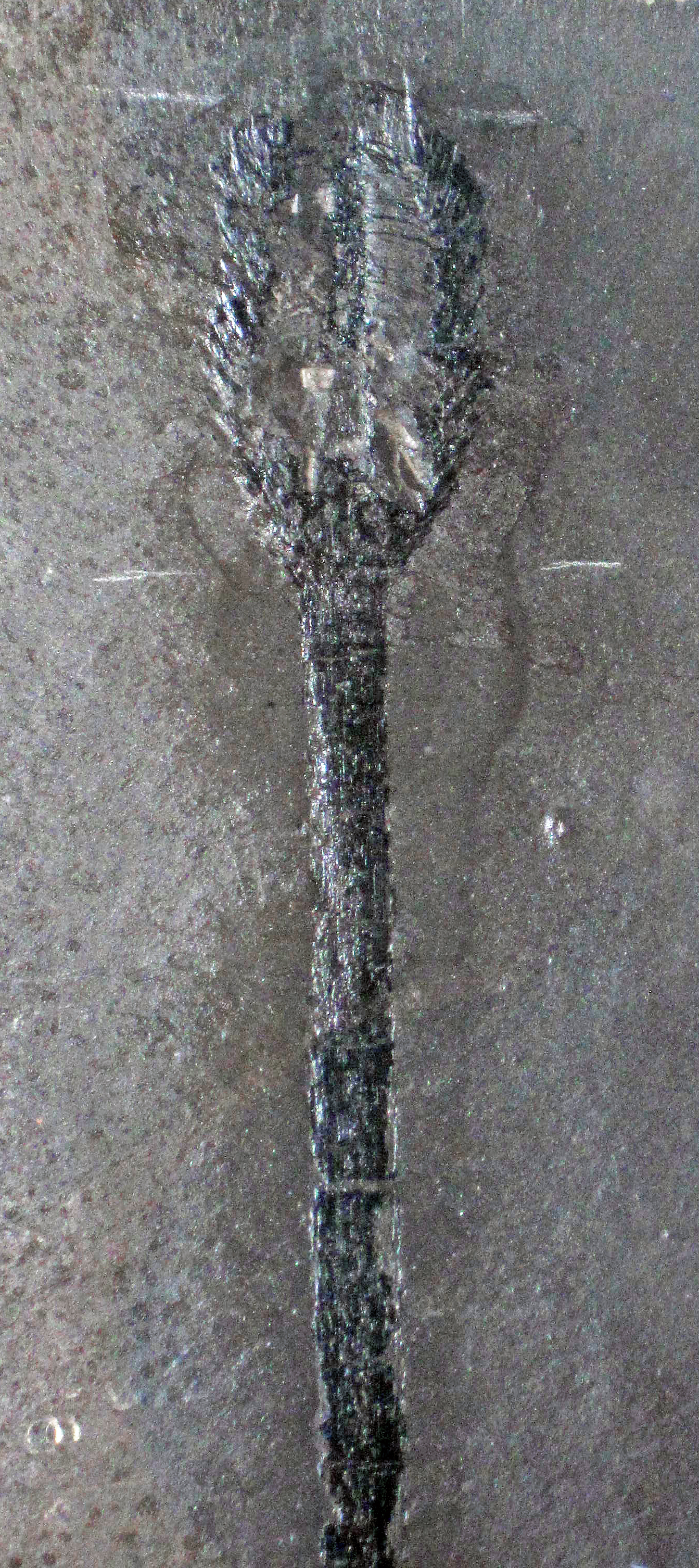

Scientific classification
- Kingdom: Plantae
- Clade: Tracheophytes
- Clade: Lycophytes
- Class: Lycopodiopsida
- Order: Isoetales
- Genus: †Clevelandodendron; Pigg & Rothwell (1996)
- Species: †C. ohioensis

Binomial name
- †Clevelandodendron ohioensis Pigg & Rothwell (1996)

= Clevelandodendron =

Clevelandodendron Temporal range: Late Devonian, ~362.6–360.1 Ma

Extinct genus of lycopsid plants

Clevelandodendron is an extinct genus of lycopsid known from a single specimen from the Cleveland Shale. The only known specimen is significant because it preserves the complete plant from the basal portion, featuring thick appendages at one end, to near the shoot apex. The stem, which is 2 cm wide along most of its length, bears a terminal ovoid bisporangiate strobilus at the end which is similar to those of some Lepidodendrales. The early occurrence of Clevelandodendron demonstrates that slender, unbranched lycopsids with an isoetalean plant habit existed as early as the upper Devonian and that diversification of the order may have been well established before the Carboniferous.
