= Nathorstiana =

Nathorstiana Temporal range: Early Cretaceous

Scientific classification
- Kingdom: Plantae
- Clade: Tracheophytes
- Clade: Lycophytes
- Class: Lycopodiopsida
- Order: Isoetales
- Family: †Nathorstianaceae; Němejc (1963)
- Genus: †Nathorstiana; P.B.Richt. (1909)
- Species: †N. arborea

Binomial name
- †Nathorstiana arborea P.B.Richt. (1909)

Extinct genus of lycopsid plants

Nathorstiana is an extinct genus of lycopsid from the Early Cretaceous; it contains the single species Nathorstiana arborea. The genus is important in lycopod evolution for being a potential bridge between the Triassic Pleuromeia and extant Isoetes. It is known from one collection of nearly 270 specimens that include many different ontogenetic stages, including nearly every part of the plant. The root-bearing base grew downwards, shedding older root growth as it produced newer roots on its lower end, which varied in shape depending on the plant's age. Younger Nathorstiana exhibited a radially symmetrical, dome-shaped root structure with no lobes. As they grew, the dome grew into a cylindrical shape before splitting into two and then four lobes distally.

== Nathorstianaceae ==
Nathorstianaceae is a family of extinct represented only by the genus Nathorstiana. Representing a bridge between older and extant families of Isoetales, they persisted until the Early Cretaceous and are the most recent in the order to possess elongated stems.
