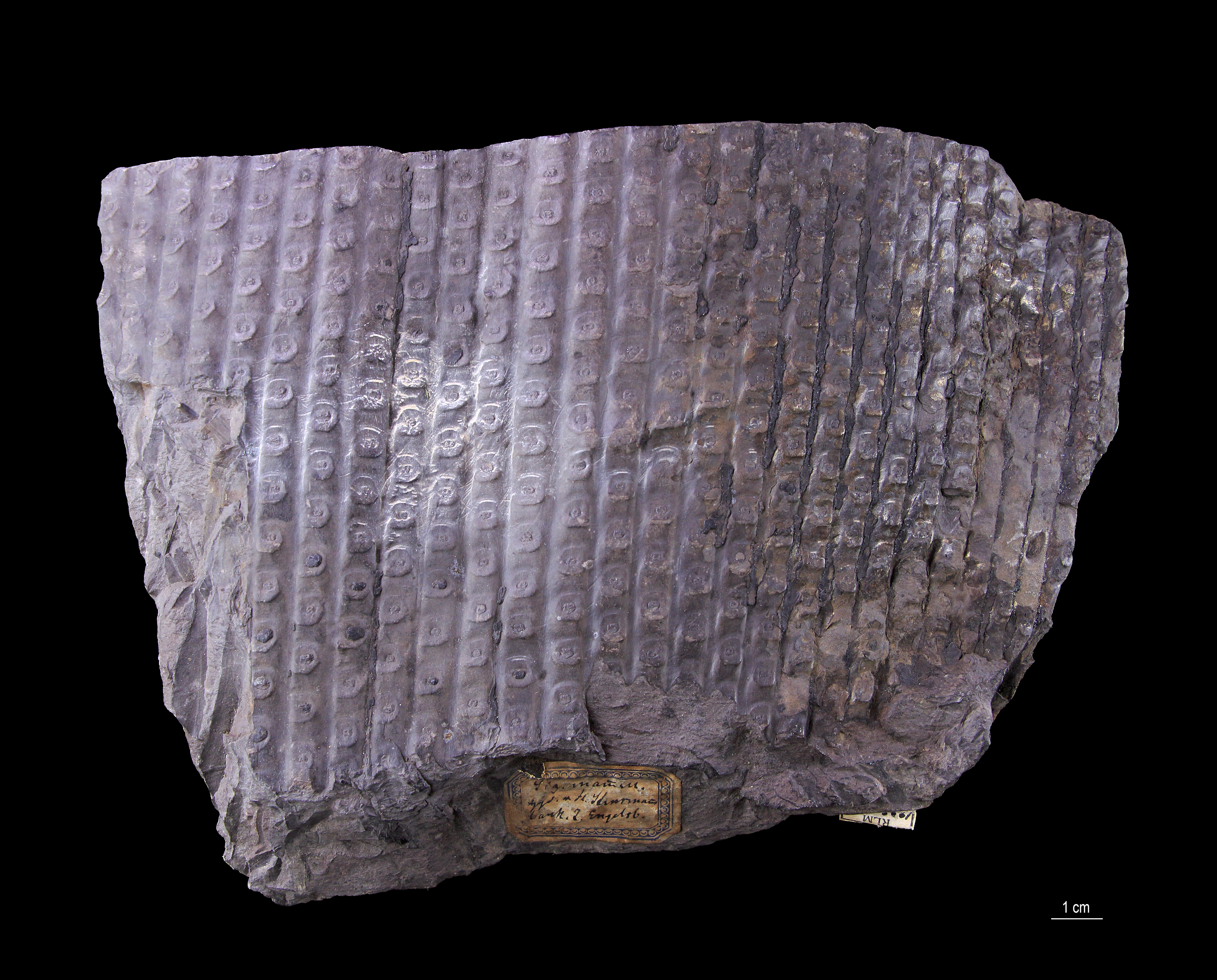
- Bark fragment from Sigillaria mamillaris sp. Estonian Museum of Natural History, Tallinn, Estonia.

Scientific classification
- Kingdom: Plantae
- Clade: Tracheophytes
- Clade: Lycophytes
- Class: Lycopodiopsida
- Order: †Lepidodendrales
- Family: †Sigillariaceae
- Genus: †Sigillaria; Brongniart (1822)

= Sigillaria =

Sigillaria Temporal range: Carboniferous-Permian, 323.2–254.0 Ma Possible Devonian record

Extinct genus of spore-bearing plants

Sigillaria is a genus of extinct, spore-bearing, arborescent lycophyte, known from the Carboniferous and Permian periods. It is related to the more famous Lepidodendron, and more distantly to modern quillworts.

== Fossil records ==
This genus is known in the fossil records from as early as the Middle Devonian or the Late Carboniferous period but dwindled to extinction in the Early Permian period (age range: from 383.7 to 254.0 million years ago). Fossils are found in Great Britain, United States, Canada, China, Korea, Tanzania and Zimbabwe.

== Description ==
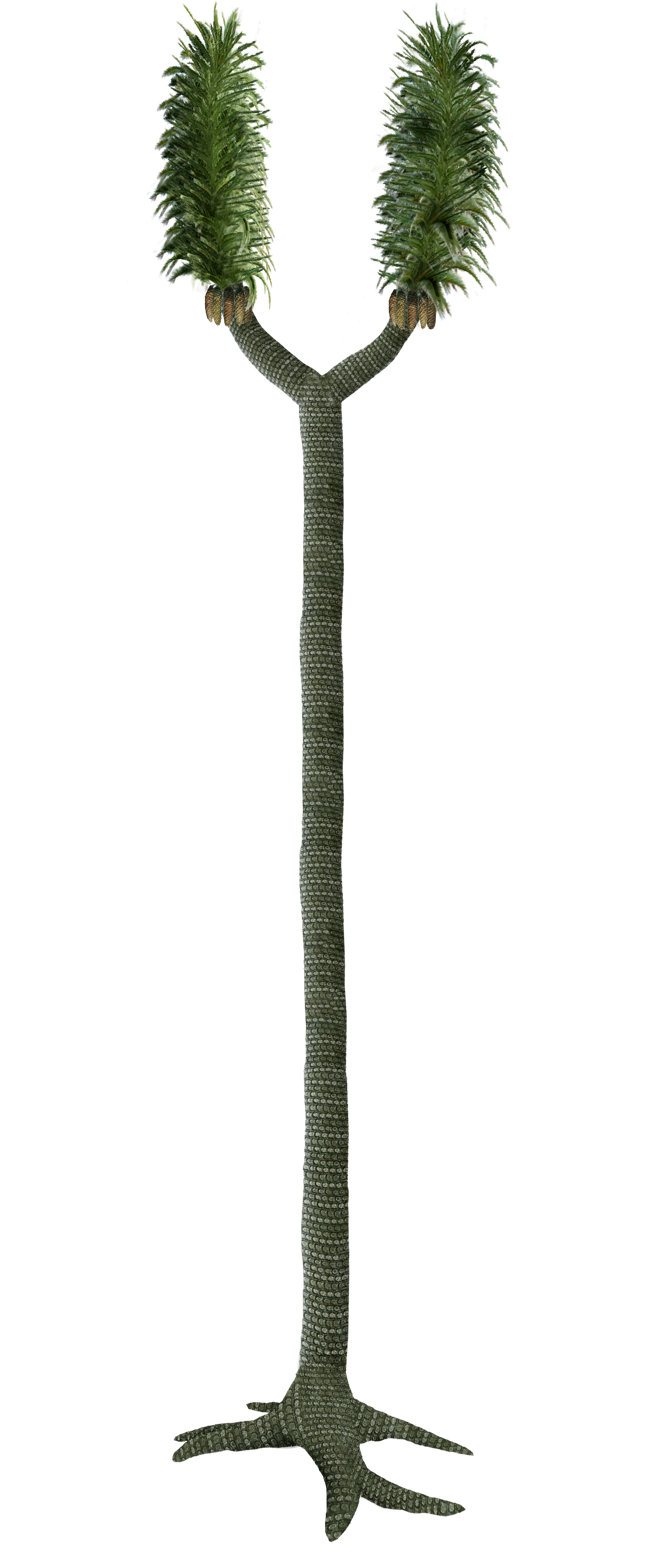
Restoration

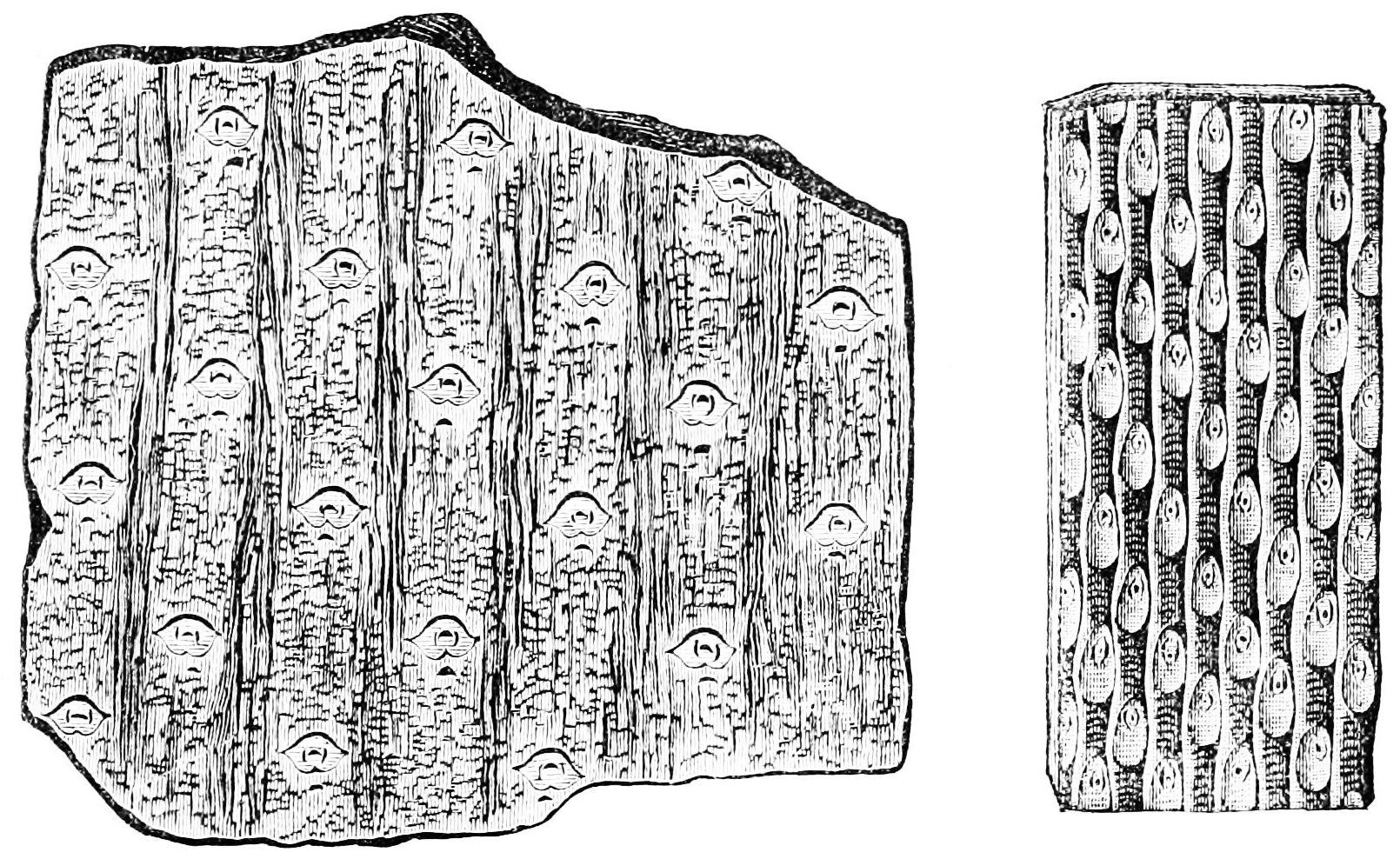
Leaf scars are shown between the vertical sections of a Sigillaria where the leaves used to be attached

Sigillaria was a tree-like plant reaching a height up to 30 m (98 ft), and lycopsids were capable to reach a height of up to 50 m (160 ft). These lycopsids had a tall, single or occasionally forked trunk that lacked wood. Support came from a layer of closely packed leaf bases just below the surface of the trunk, while the center was filled with pith. The long, thin grasslike leaves were attached directly to the stem and grew in a spiral along the trunk. The old leaf bases expanded as the trunk grew in width, and left a diamond-shaped pattern, which is evident in fossils. These leaf scars were arranged in vertical rows. The trunk had photosynthetic tissue on the surface, meaning that it was probably green.

The trunk was topped with a plume of long, grass-like, microphyllous leaves, so that the plant looked somewhat like a tall, forked bottle brush. The plant bore its spores (not seeds) in cone-like structures attached to the stem.

The underground structures of arborescent lycophytes including Sigillaria and Lepidodendron are assigned under the form taxon, Stigmaria. The lycopsids had rhizomes or shoot-like rhizomorphic axes, with lateral appendages attached from the circular scars, forming an underground network of branched rootlets. These stigmarian rootlets branched dichotomously from the rhizomorphs similar to Isoetes, and spread throughout the coal swamp forest areas where the lycopods were commonly found. Root hairs from the rootlet scars identified in Stigmaria fossils were attached when the lycopsids were alive.

Sigillaria, like many ancient lycopods, had a relatively short life cycle - growing rapidly and reaching maturity in a few years. Sigillaria may have been monocarpic, meaning that it died after reproduction, though this is not proven. It was associated with Lepidodendron and other lycopsids from the Carboniferous coal swamps.

== Species ==
Species within this genus include:

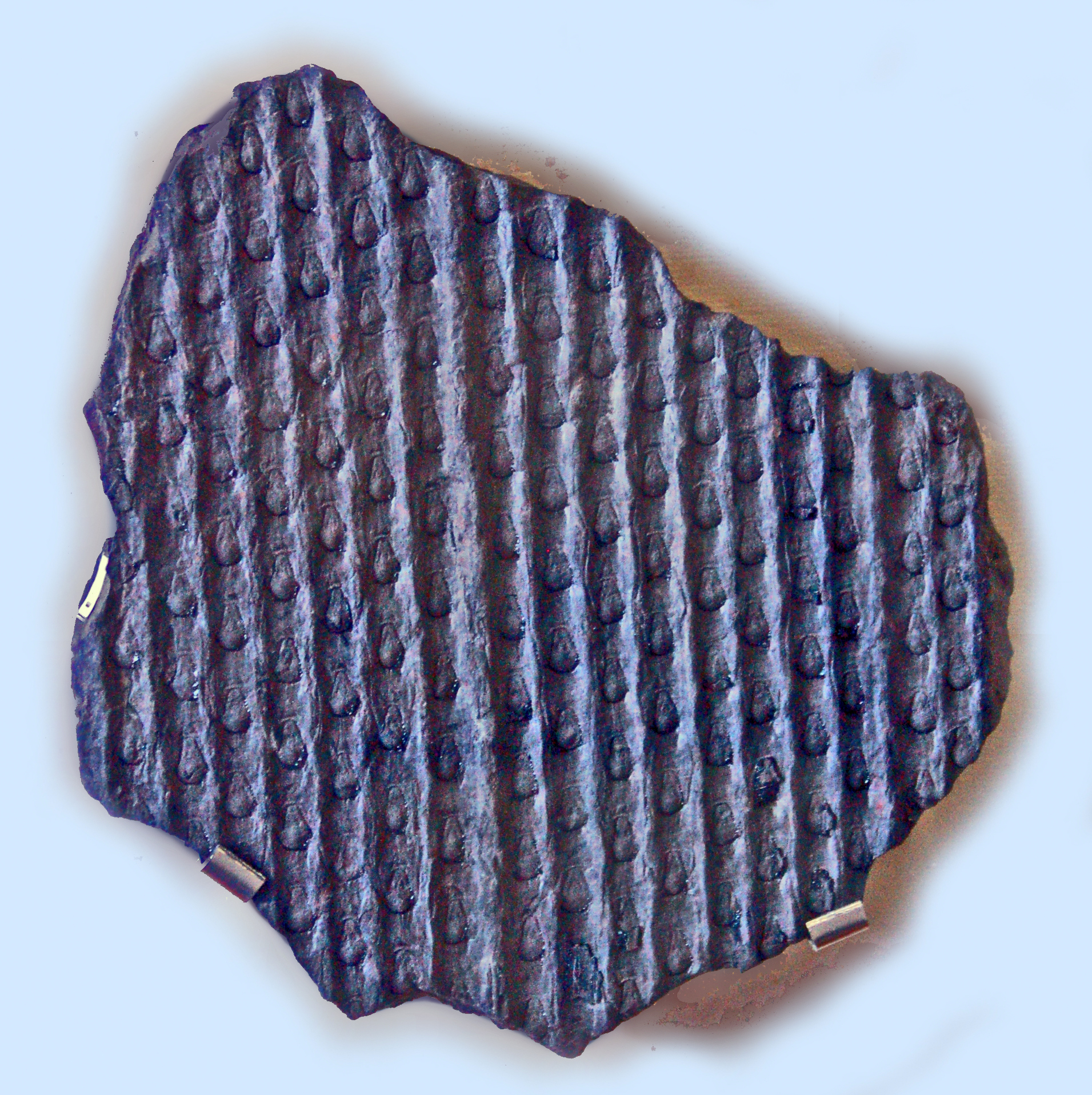
Fossil of Sigillaria trigona, on display at National Museum (Prague)

- S.alveolaris Brongniart (1828)
- S.barbata Weiss (1887)
- S.bicostata Weiss (1887)
- S.boblayi Brongniart (1828)
- S.brardii Brongniart (1828)
- S.cancriformis Weiss (1887)
- S.cristata Sauveur (1848)
- S.cumulata Weiss (1887)
- S.davreuxii Brongniart (1828)
- S.densifolia Brongniart (1836)
- S.elegans Sternberg (1825)
- S.elongata Brongniart (1824)
- S.fossorum Weiss (1887)
- S.hexagona Brongniart (1828)
- S.loricata Weiss (1887)
- S.mammiliaris Brongniart (1824)
- S.menardi Brongniart (1828)
- S.micaudi (Zeller (1886-1888)
- S.monostigma Lesquereux (1866)
- S.orbicularis Brongniart (1828)
- S.ovata Sauveur (1848)
- S.pachyderma Brongniart (1828)
- S.principes Weiss (1881)
- S.reticulata Lesquereux (1860)
- S.rugosa Brongniart (1828)
- S.saulii Brongniart (1836)
- S.schotheimiana Brongniart (1836)
- S.scutellata Brongniart (1822)
- S.sillimanni Brongniart (1828)
- S.tesselata Brongniart (1828)
- S.transversalis Brongniart (1828)
- S.trigona Sternberg (1826)
- S.voltzii Brongniart (1828)

== Gallery ==
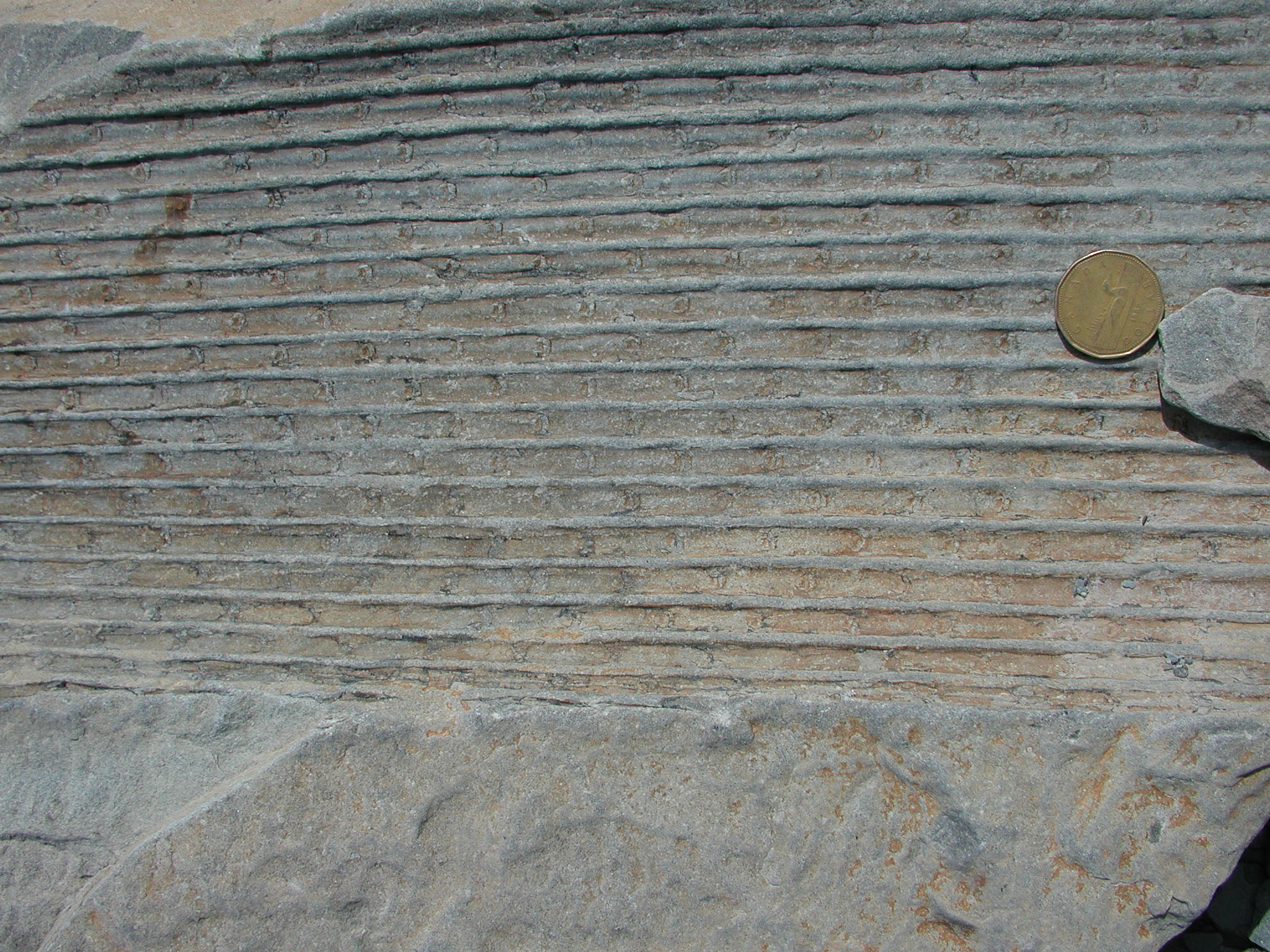
Sigillaria lycopod fossil, Joggins, Nova Scotia, Canada

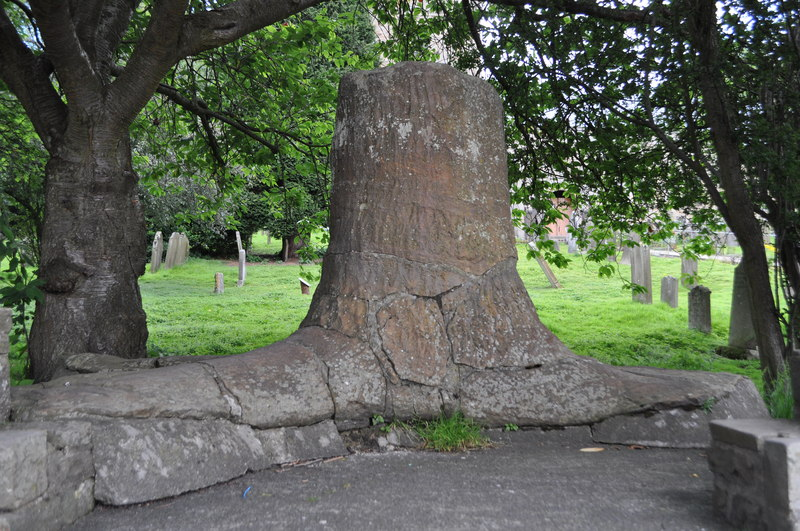
Fossil of Sigillaria trunk attached to a stigmarian root system (lycopsid rhizomes)

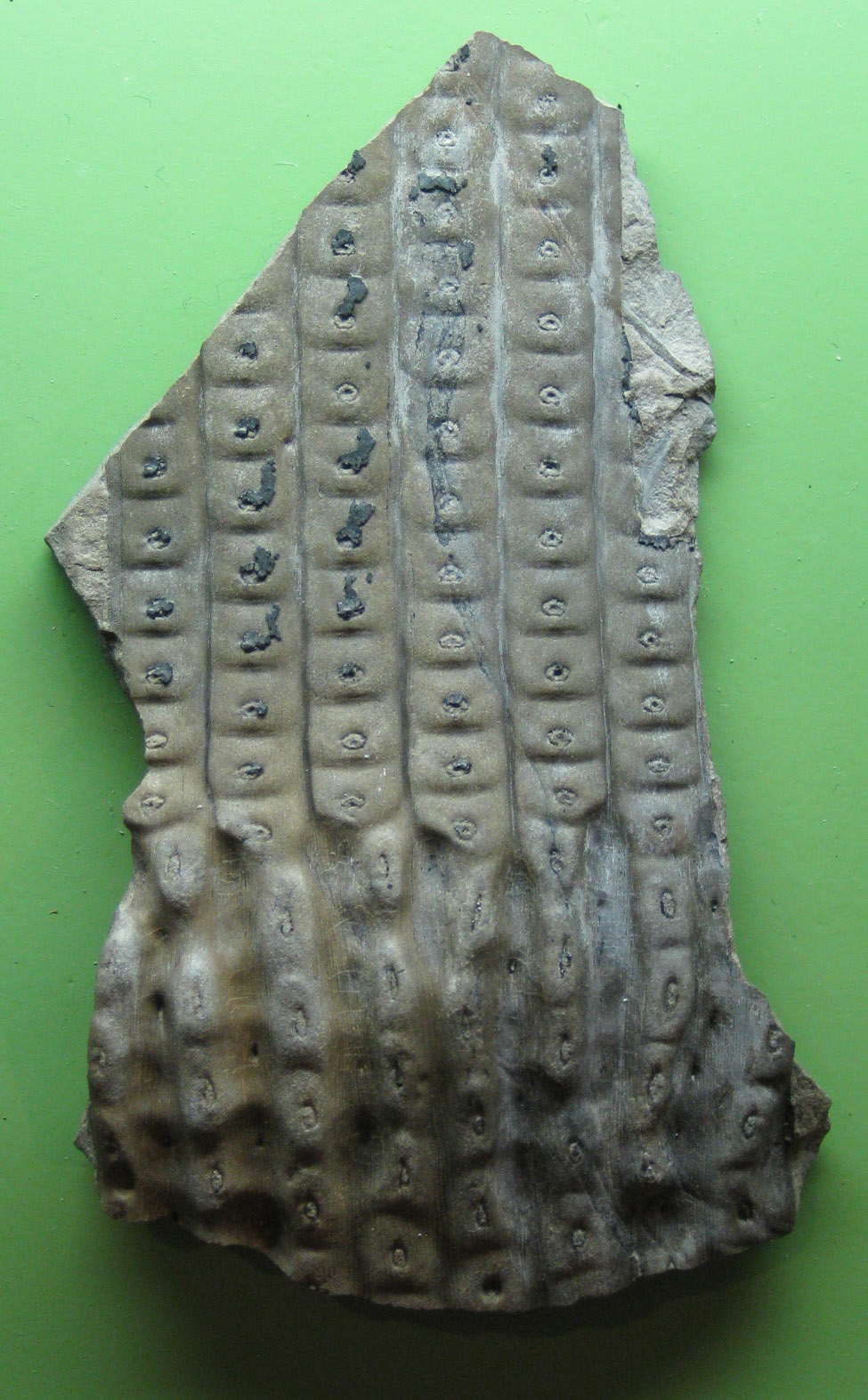
Sigillaria on display at State Museum of Pennsylvania, from Sharon, Mercer County, Pennsylvania

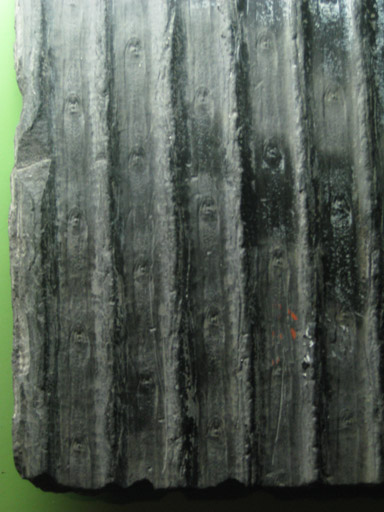
Sigillaria (bark) on display at State Museum of Pennsylvania, from Scranton, Lackawanna County, Pennsylvania

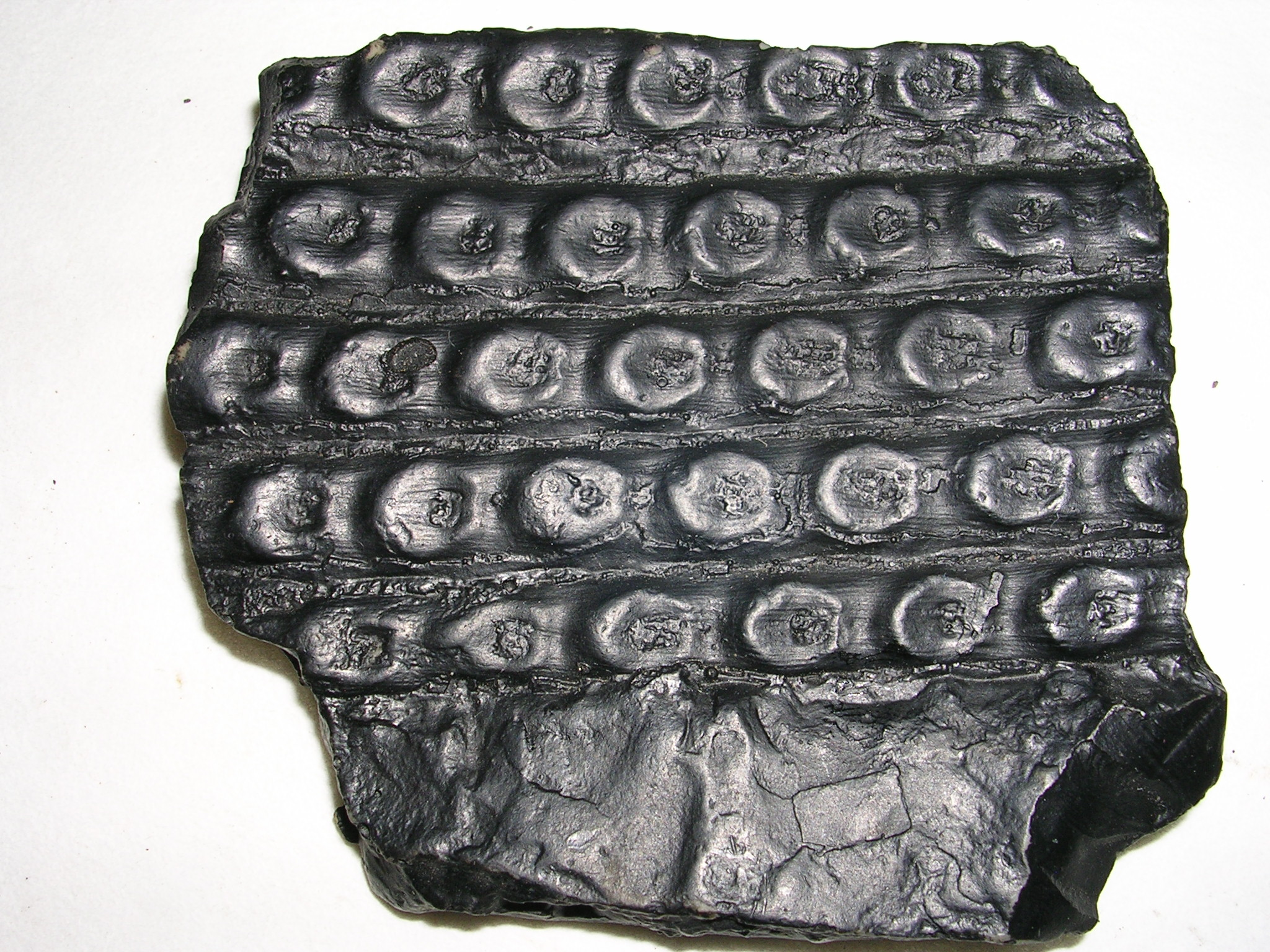
Replica of Sigillaria sp. at the University of A Coruña

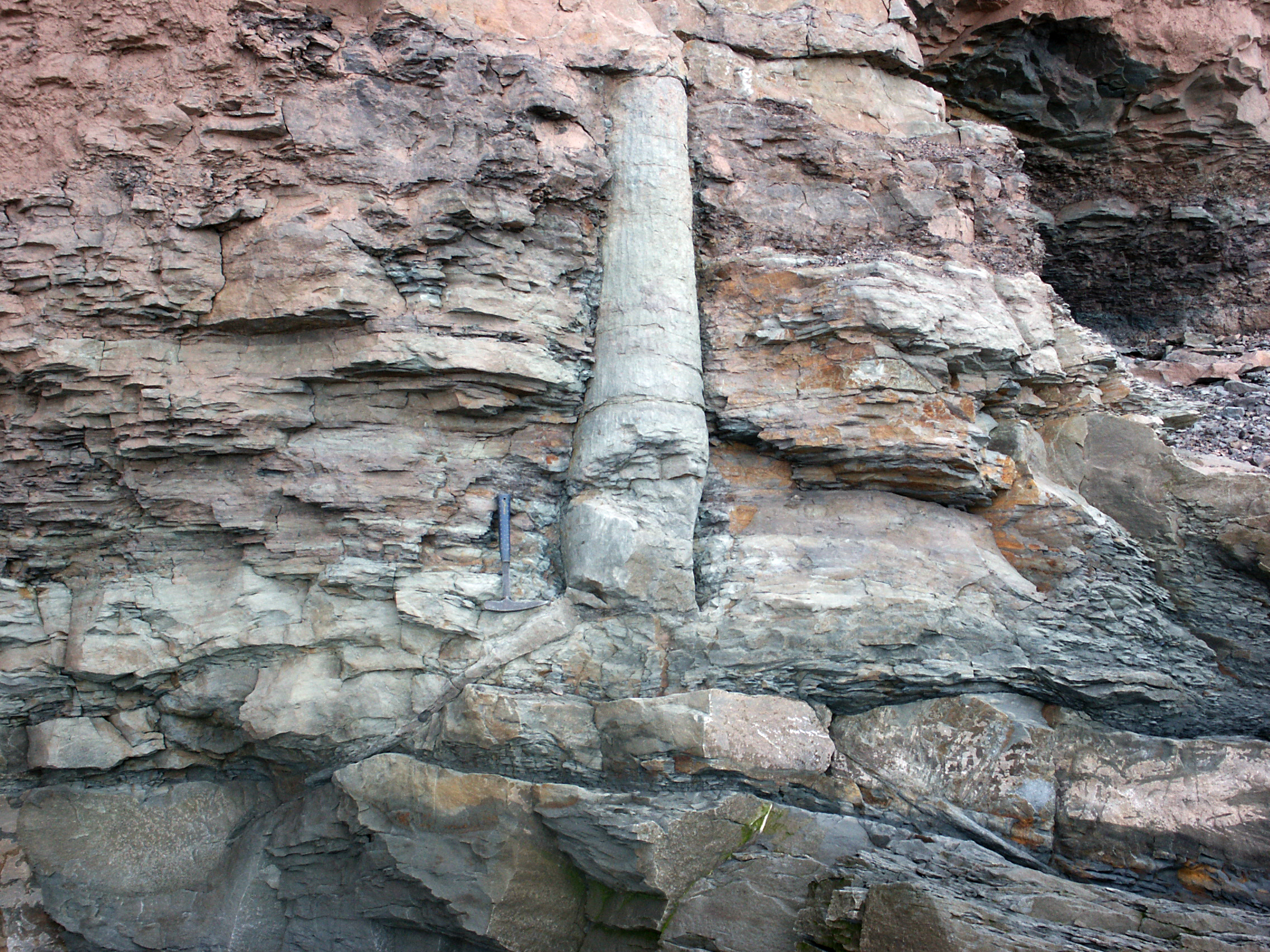
In situ Lycopsid that is probably Sigillaria from the Pennsylvanian Joggins Formation in Nova Scotia

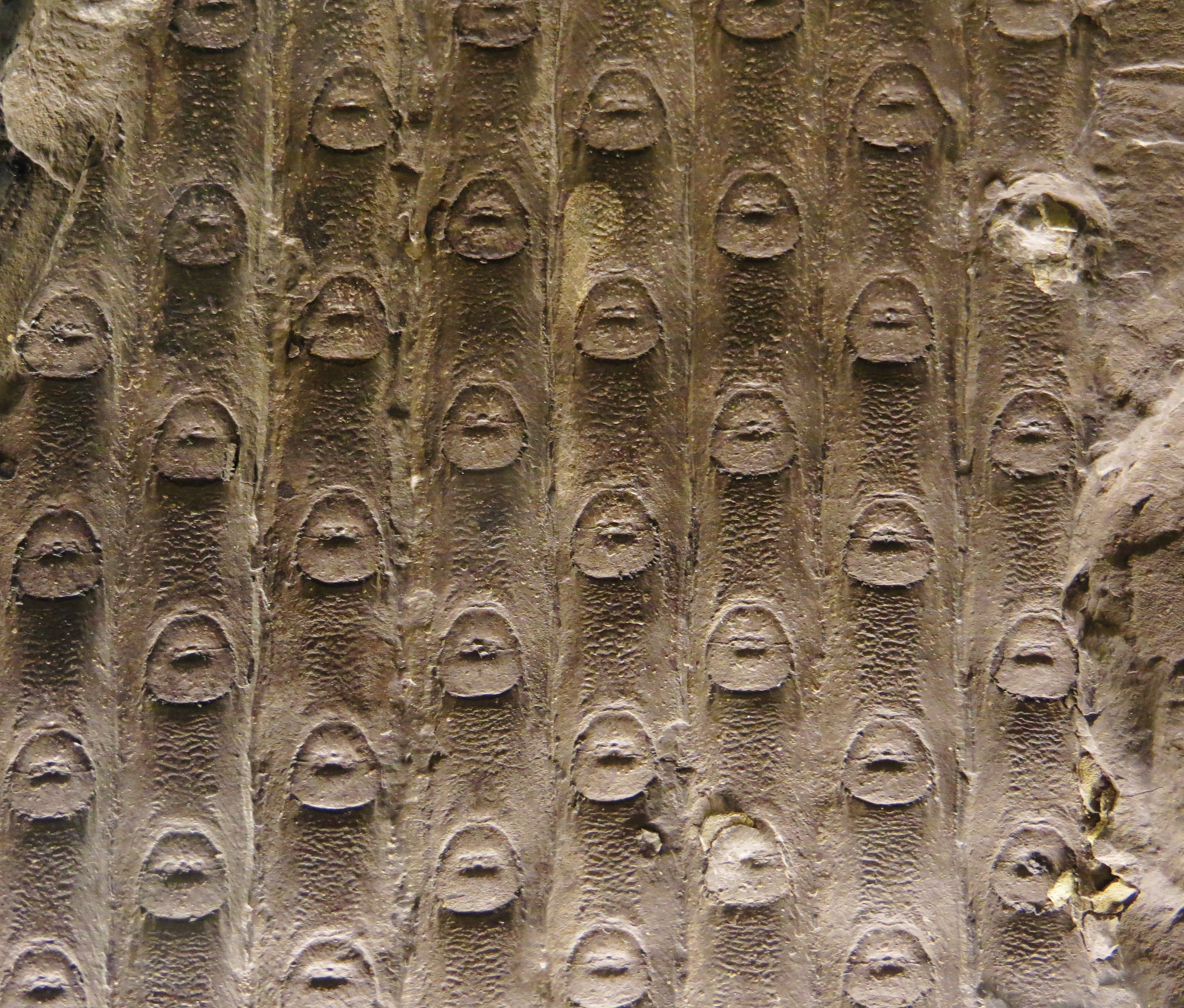
A close-up of the leaf scars on a Sigillaria notata

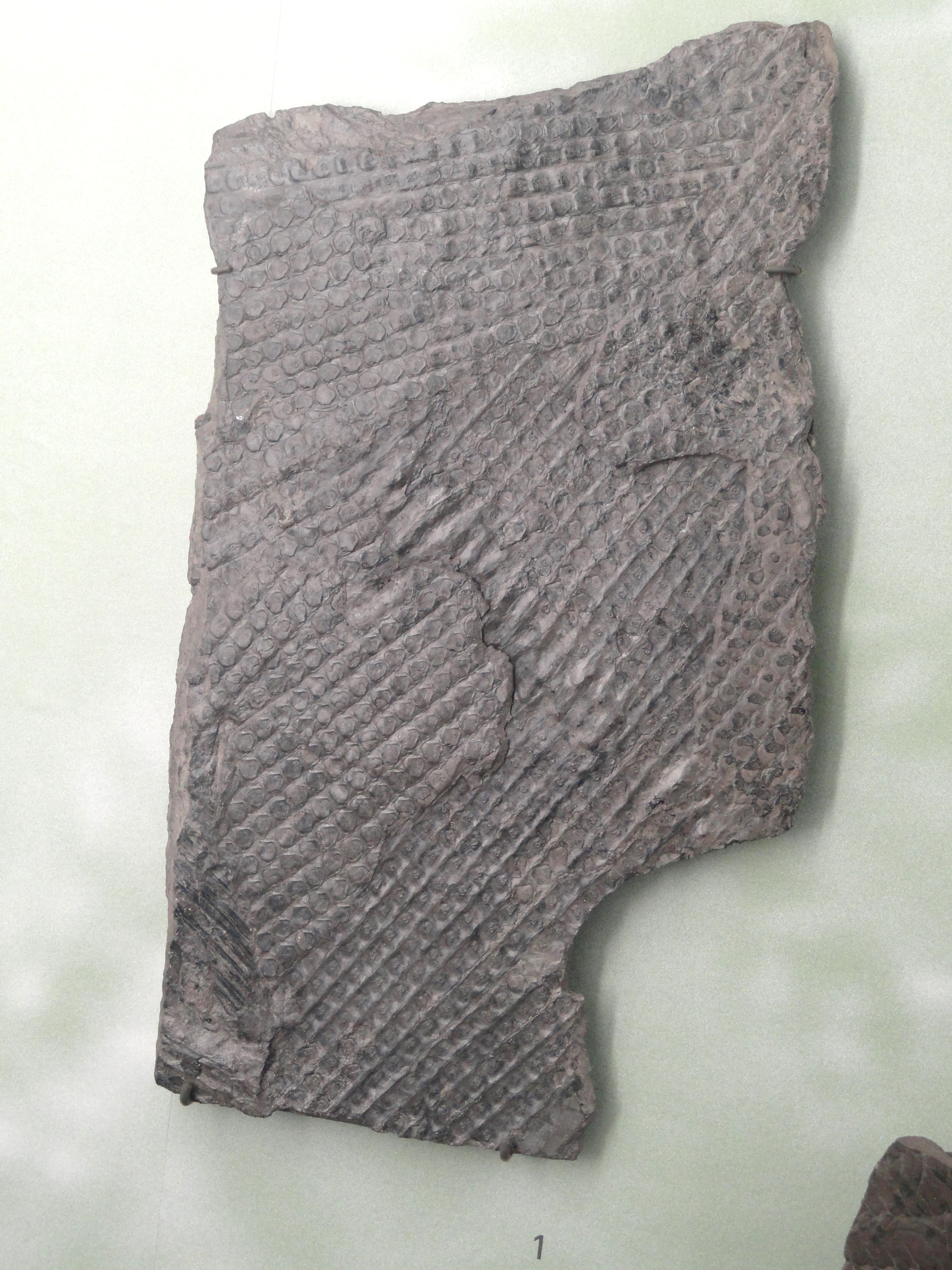
Sigillaria mammillaris

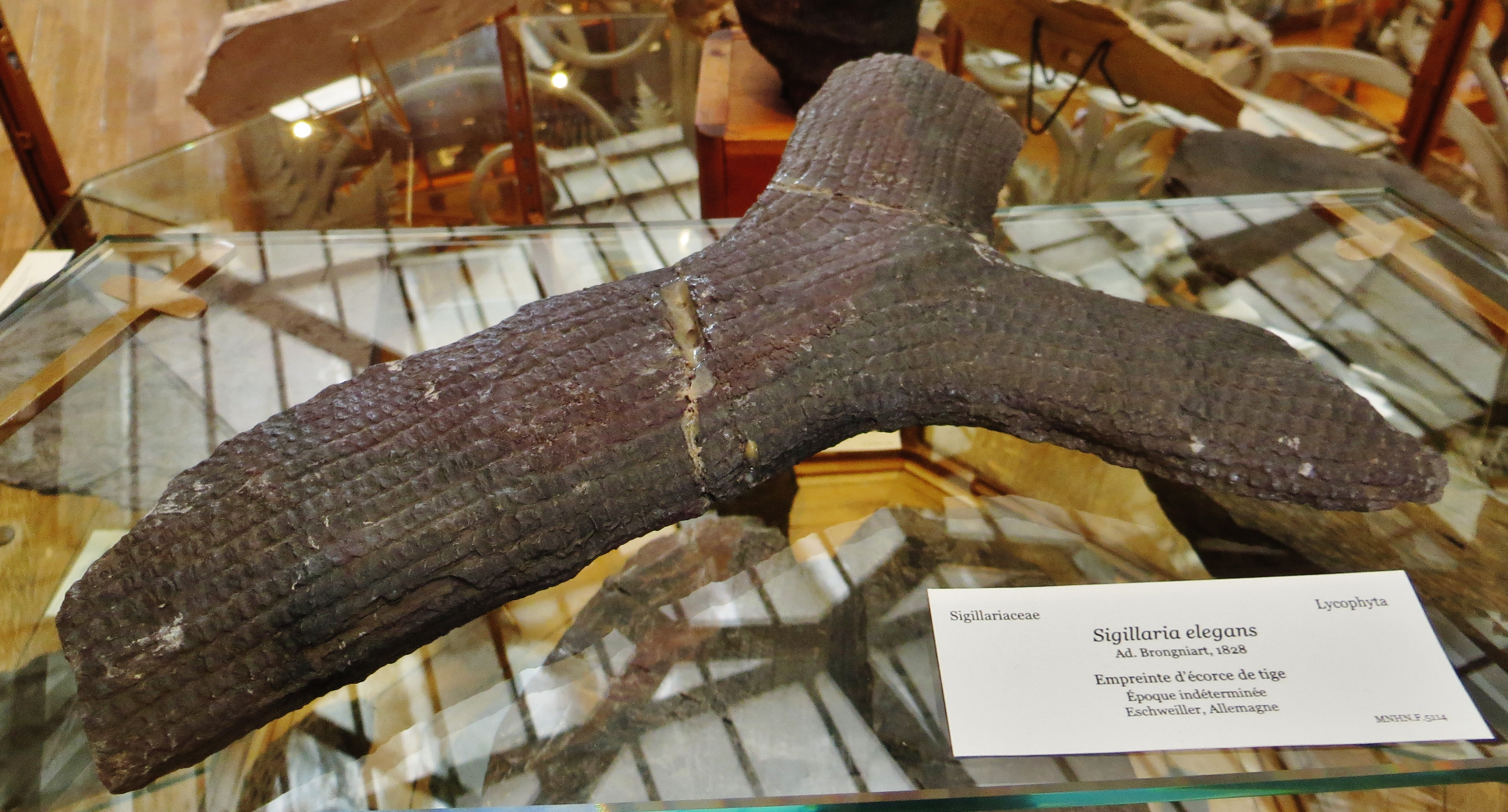
Sigillaria elegans

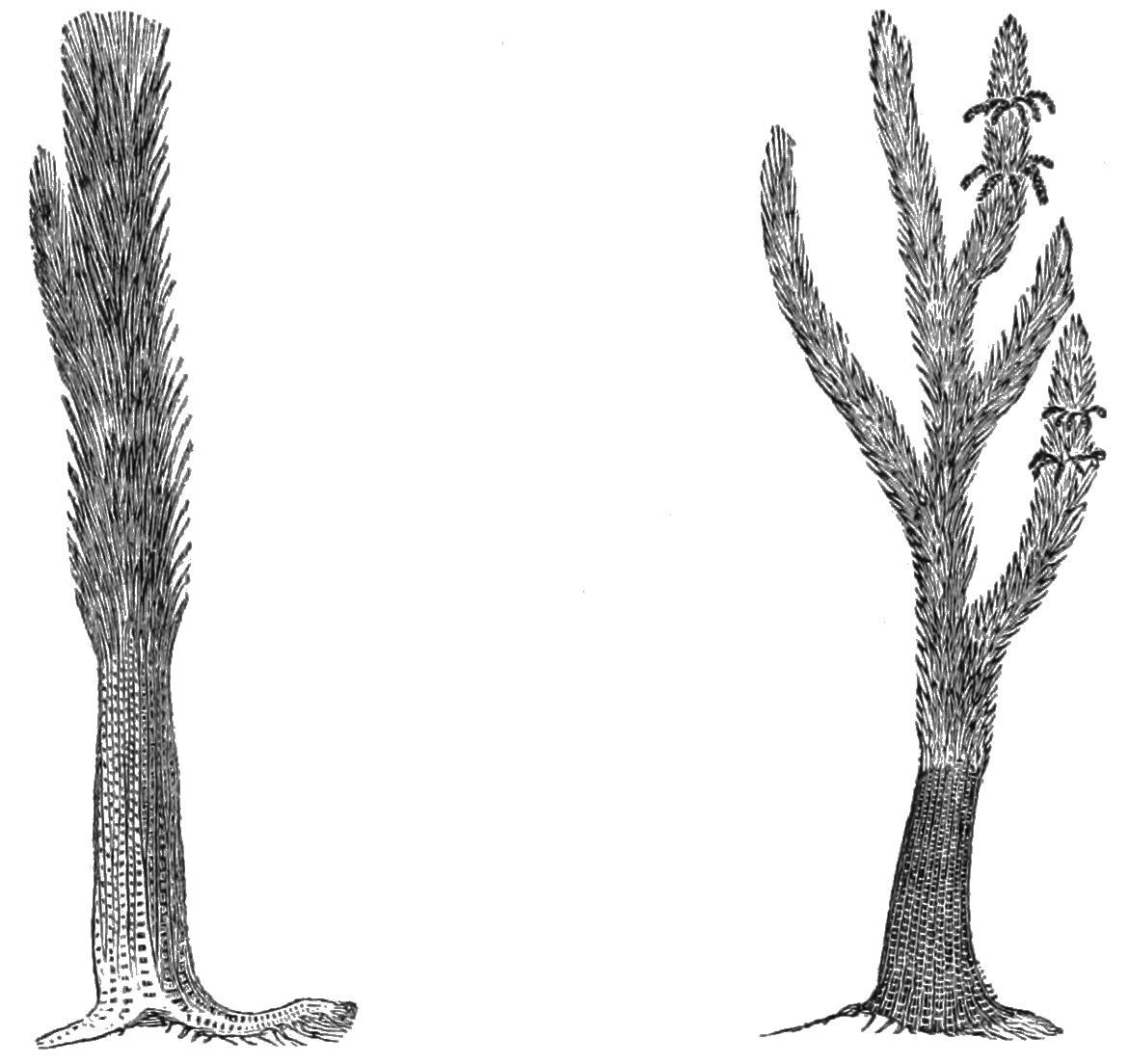
Sigillaria restorations

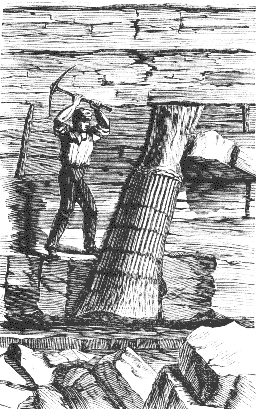
Sigillaria preserved in the cliffs at Joggins, Nova Scotia, Canada

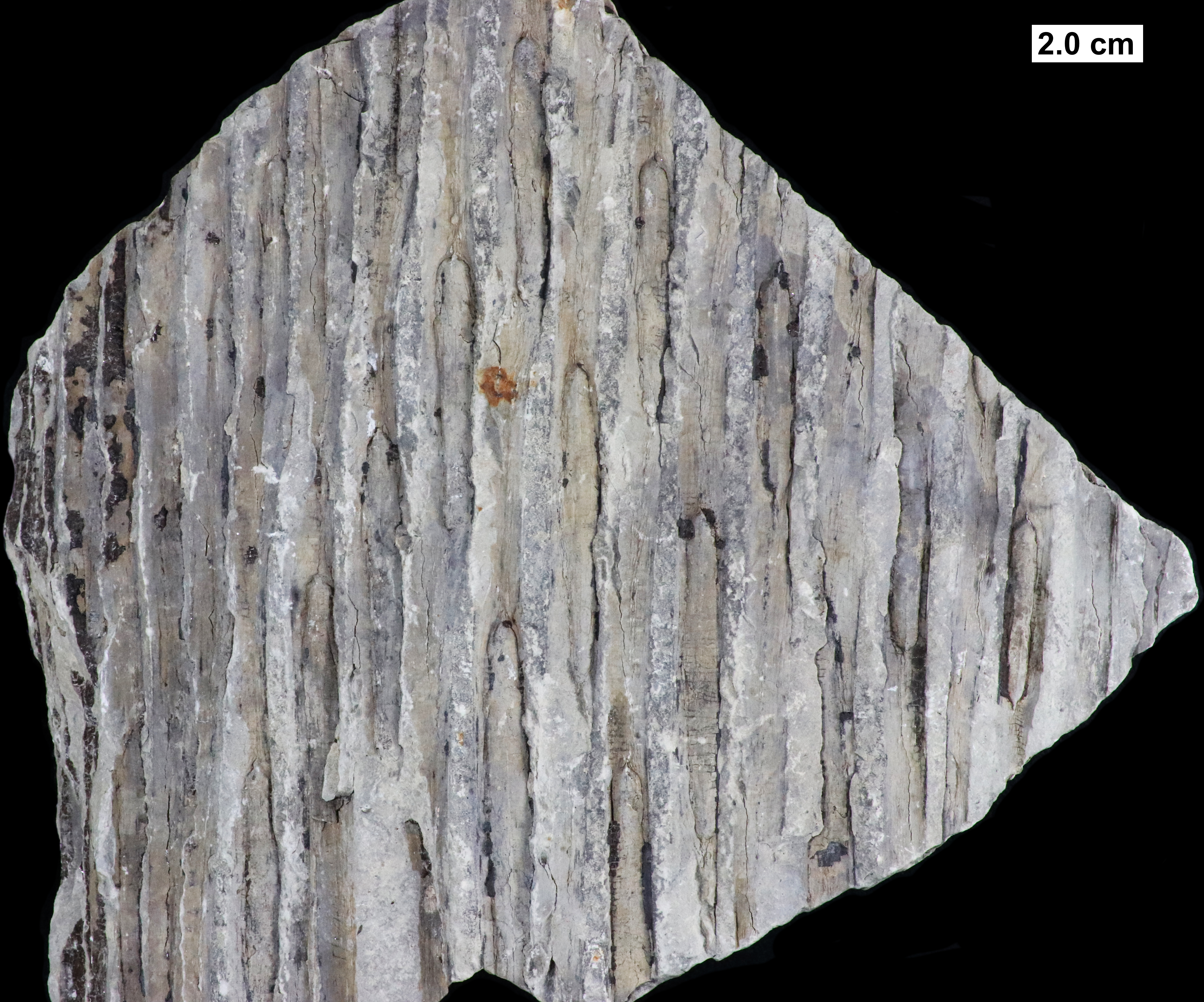
Lycopod bark (possibly an early species of Sigillaria) showing leaf scars, from the Middle Devonian of Wisconsin.

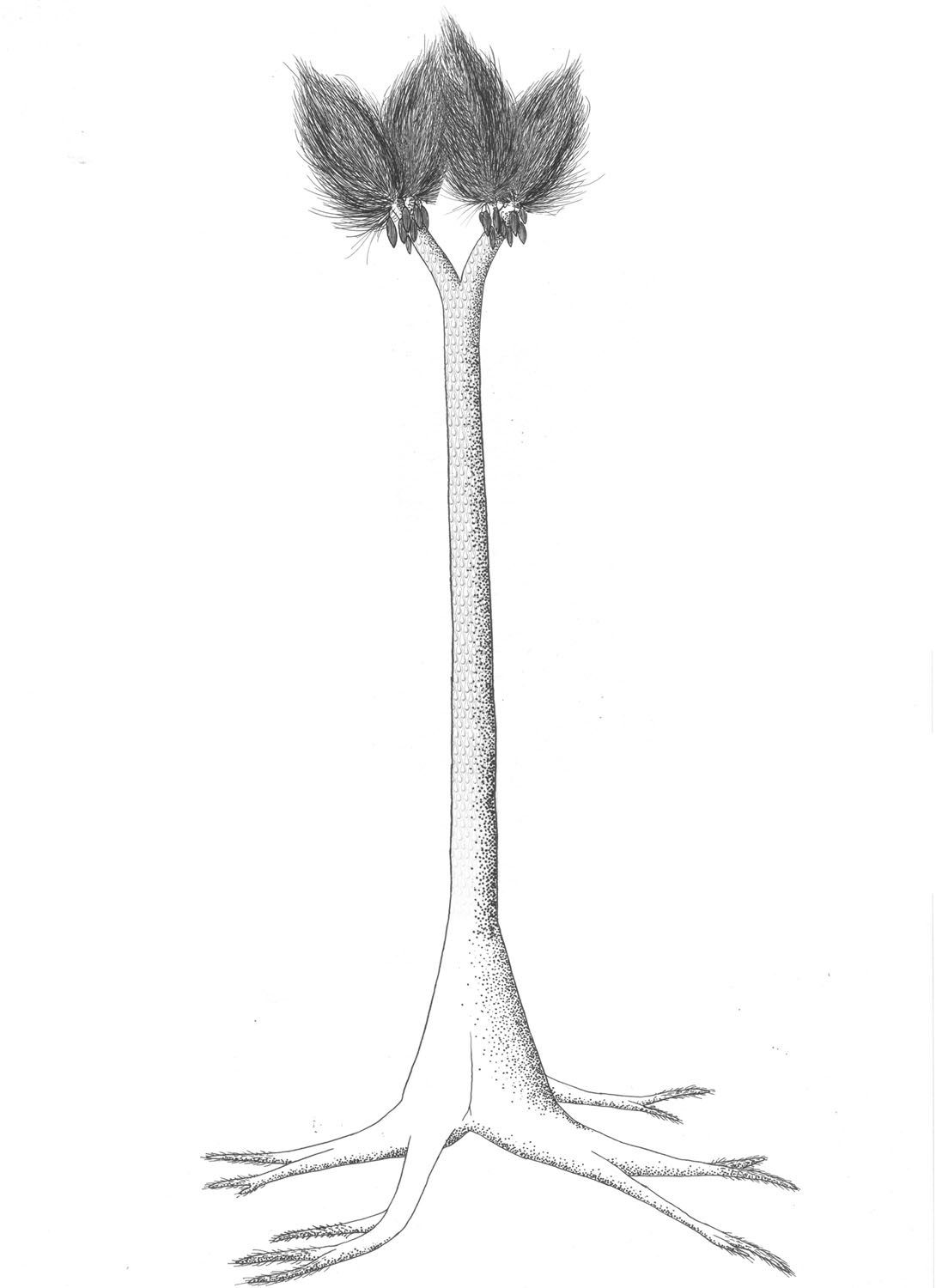
Restoration

== Bibliography ==
- William A. DiMichele, Richard M. Bateman: The Rhizomorphic Lycopsids: A Case-Study in Paleobotanical Classification. Systematic Botany, 1996, volume 21, pages 535-552.
- Thomas N. Taylor, Edith L. Taylor, Michael Krings: Paleobotany. The Biology and Evolution of Fossil Plants. Second Edition, Academic Press 2009, ISBN 978-0-12-373972-8, pages 303-307
- J. W. Sir Dawson - On the structure and affinities of Sigillaria, Calamites and Calamodendron - Paperback – August 16, 2011 ISBN 1175560871
- Silva Pineda, A. (2003). "Flora del Pérmico de la región de Izúcar de Matamoros, Puebla". En Soto, L. A. Agustín Ayala-Castañares: universitario, impulsor de la investigación científica. UNAM. p. 371. ISBN 9789703207893
