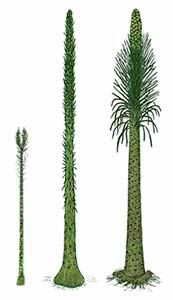
- Reconstructions of Clevelandodendron (left), Chaloneria (center), and Pleuromeia (right)

Scientific classification
- Kingdom: Plantae
- Clade: Tracheophytes
- Clade: Lycophytes
- Class: Lycopodiopsida
- Order: Isoetales
- Family: †Chaloneriaceae
- Genus: †Chaloneria; Pigg & Rothwell (1983)

Species
- †Chaloneria cormosa; †Chaloneria periodica

= Chaloneria =

Chaloneria Temporal range: Pennsylvanian, ~Middle Pennsylvanian–Late Pennsylvanian

Extinct genus of lycopsid plants

Chaloneria is a genus of extinct lycopsid from the Middle to Late Pennsylvanian of the Carboniferous. The unbranched plant grows to a height of around 2 m, with a stem diameter of 10 cm. Leaves, adorning the stem in a helical pattern, leaving behind irregular leaf scars when broken off. It has a fertile region at the top of the stem, bearing alternating micro- and megasporangial areas.
