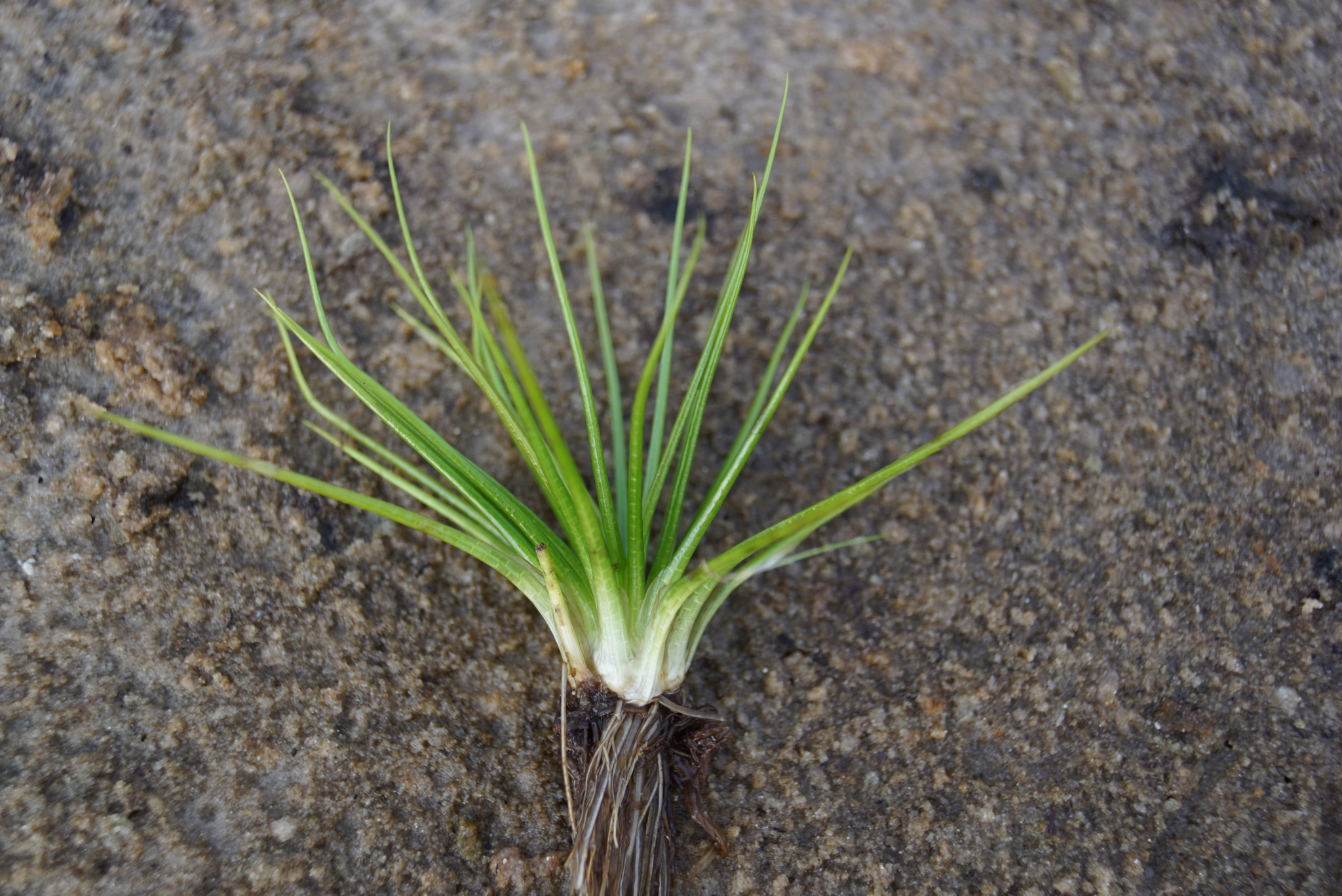
- Isoetes (Isoetaceae)
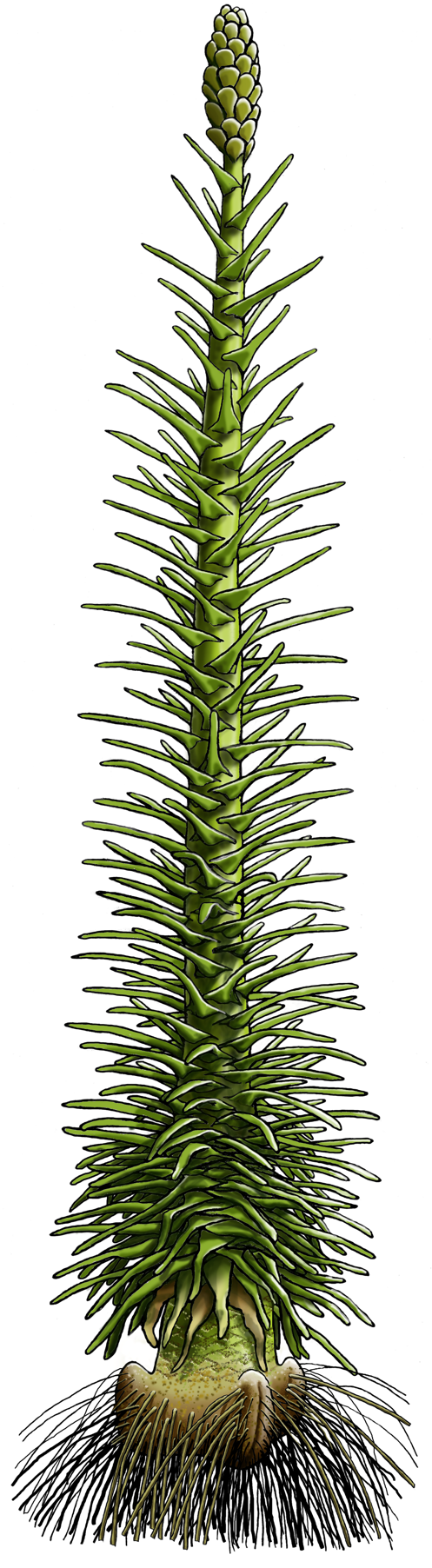
- †Pleuromeia (Pleuromeiaceae)

Scientific classification
- Kingdom: Plantae
- Clade: Tracheophytes
- Clade: Lycophytes
- Class: Lycopodiopsida
- Order: Isoetales; Prantl

Families
- †Chaloneriaceae; Isoetaceae †Nathorstianaceae †Pleuromeiaceae (Possibly) †Lepidodendrales †Porongodendron (?)†Clevelandodendron

= Isoetales =

Isoetales Temporal range: Devonian–Present

Order of free-sporing vascular plants

Isoetales, sometimes also written Isoëtales, is an order of plants in the class Lycopodiopsida.

There are about 140-150 living species, all of which are classified in the genus Isoetes, (quillworts), with a cosmopolitan distribution, but often scarce to rare. Living species are mostly aquatic or semi-aquatic, and are found in clear ponds and slowly moving streams. Each leaf is slender and broadens downward to a swollen base up to 5 mm wide where the leaves attach in clusters to a bulb-like, underground corm characteristic of most quillworts. This swollen base also contains male and female sporangia, protected by a thin, transparent covering (velum), which is used diagnostically to help identify quillwort species. Quillwort species are very difficult to distinguish by general appearance. The best way to identify them is by examining the megaspores under a microscope.

Isoetes are the only living pteridophytes capable of secondary growth.

Fossil records of Isoetales sensu lato extend back to the Devonian, likely originating from the rhyniophytoids or protolepidodendraleans. Clevelandodendron, a lycopod from the Late Devonian Cleveland Shale, bears many features prevalent in Isoetales, but uncertainty remains as to its classification in either Isoetales or the closely related Lepidodendrales. Regardless, it is significant in showing that isoetalean growth habits had developed by the Late Devonian. Fossils of Porongodendron have been found from the Mississippian of Argentina with adaptations for the harsher tundra climate characteristic of the then-polar region. Long-stemmed, arborescent Isoetales such as Chaloneria became prevalent during the Pennsylvanian, while later later genera such as the strobilus-bearing Pleuromeia were dominant over large areas of the globe during the Early Triassic, possibly serving as a pioneer species. Fossilised specimens of Isoetes beestonii have been found in rocks dating to the latest Permian-earliest Triassic, but the oldest fossil closely resembling modern quillworts is Isoetites rolandii from the Late Jurassic of North America.

Isoetales are more closely related to the order of "arborescent lycophytes", Lepidodendrales, than they are to Lycopodiales (clubmosses and firmosses) and Selaginellales (spikemosses), with some authors including Lepidodendrales as part of Isoetales. Some members of Isoletales sensu lato, such as Pleuromeiaceae and Chaloneriaceae, may be more closely related to "aborescent lycophytes" than to Isoetes. Early arborescent Isoetales such as Clevelandodendron show evidence of evolutionary convergence within the order, such as having a single, spore-bearing strobilus or corm-like underground stems, features only known otherwise in less basal families. Peng et al. (2026) suggest that Carboniferous Isoetales such as Porongodendron and Chaloneriaceae gave rise to later lineages such as Pleuromeiaceae, implying a divergence long before the earliest fossils have been found from this family and making Chaloneriaceae a potentially paraphyletic group including Pleuromeiaceae.
