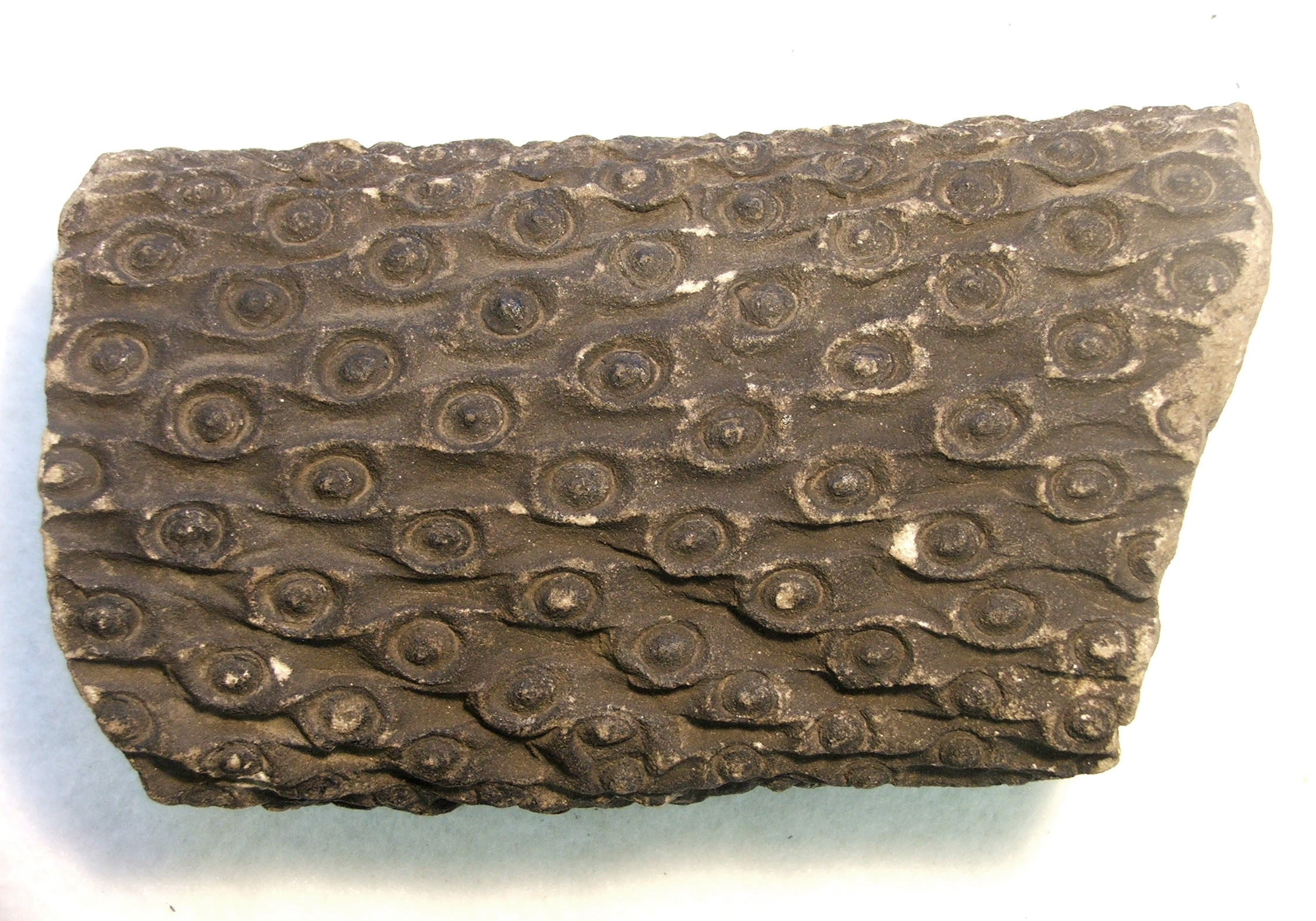
- Stigmaria, a fossil lycopsid rhizome

Scientific classification
- Kingdom: Plantae
- Clade: Tracheophytes
- Clade: Lycophytes
- Class: Lycopodiopsida
- Order: †Lepidodendrales
- Genus: †Stigmaria; Brongn.

= Stigmaria =

Stigmaria Temporal range: Carboniferous-Permian, 323.2–254.0 Ma Possible Devonian record

Fossilized root structure of extinct tree-like plants

Stigmaria is a form taxon for common fossils found in Carboniferous rocks. They represent the underground rooting structures of arborescent lycophytes such as Sigillaria and Lepidodendron under the order Lepidodendrales.

== Description and morphology ==
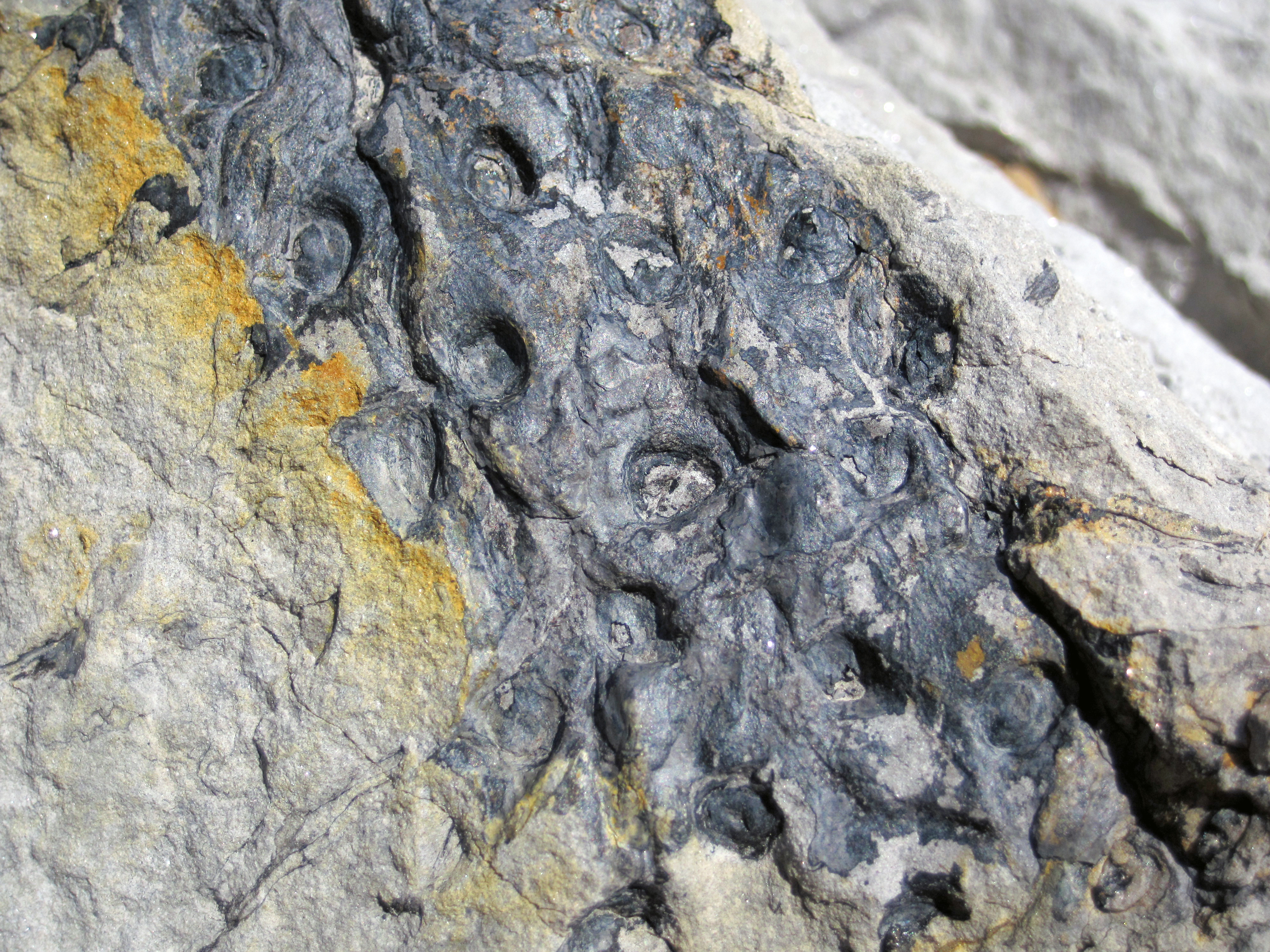
A close-up of the circular scars where the root-like appendages were attached from the stigmarian rhizome. In sandstone. Pottsville Group (Middle Pennsylvanian), Frazeysburg Pit, Muskingum County, Ohio, U.S.

=== Overview ===
The Paleozoic swamps had tree-like lycopsids that grew up to 30 m (98 ft), and even 50 m (160 ft) in height. These lycopsid plants were anchored by an extensive network of branching underground structures with root-like appendages attached to them. The underground organs or structures of these lycopsids is referred to as Stigmaria. Lycopsids first evolved during a rapid diversification of terrestrial land plants in the Devonian period and became common plants within the Carboniferous coal forest flora. Lycopsids grew in low-level swampy wetland areas which they flourished during the Pennsylvanian age. Analysis of the morphology and anatomy of the stigmarian systems suggests that the axes around the structure were shoot-like, and so they are called rhizomes or rhizomorphs. In general, common species of Stigmaria (Stigmaria ficoides sp.) have been analyzed extensively to provide an understanding of its morphology and histology.

=== Appendages ("rootlets") ===
Stigmaria had a complex branching structure; thus, it is comparable to the rhizomes of the extant (living) relative, the quillworts (genus Isoetes). The stigmarian systems had rhizomorph axes that shows circular scars or a helical arrangement where the root-like appendages were formerly attached. These appendages were branched dichotomously, establishing the root abscission areas of the stigmarian system. Since the stigmarian systems were root-like, the lateral appendages indicate that they were modified leaves adapted to serve the function of abscission. Along the rhizomorph axes, the appendages are connected to each axis in a circular pattern which would shed during the growth stage, forming the helical arrangements of Stigmaria root abscission areas.

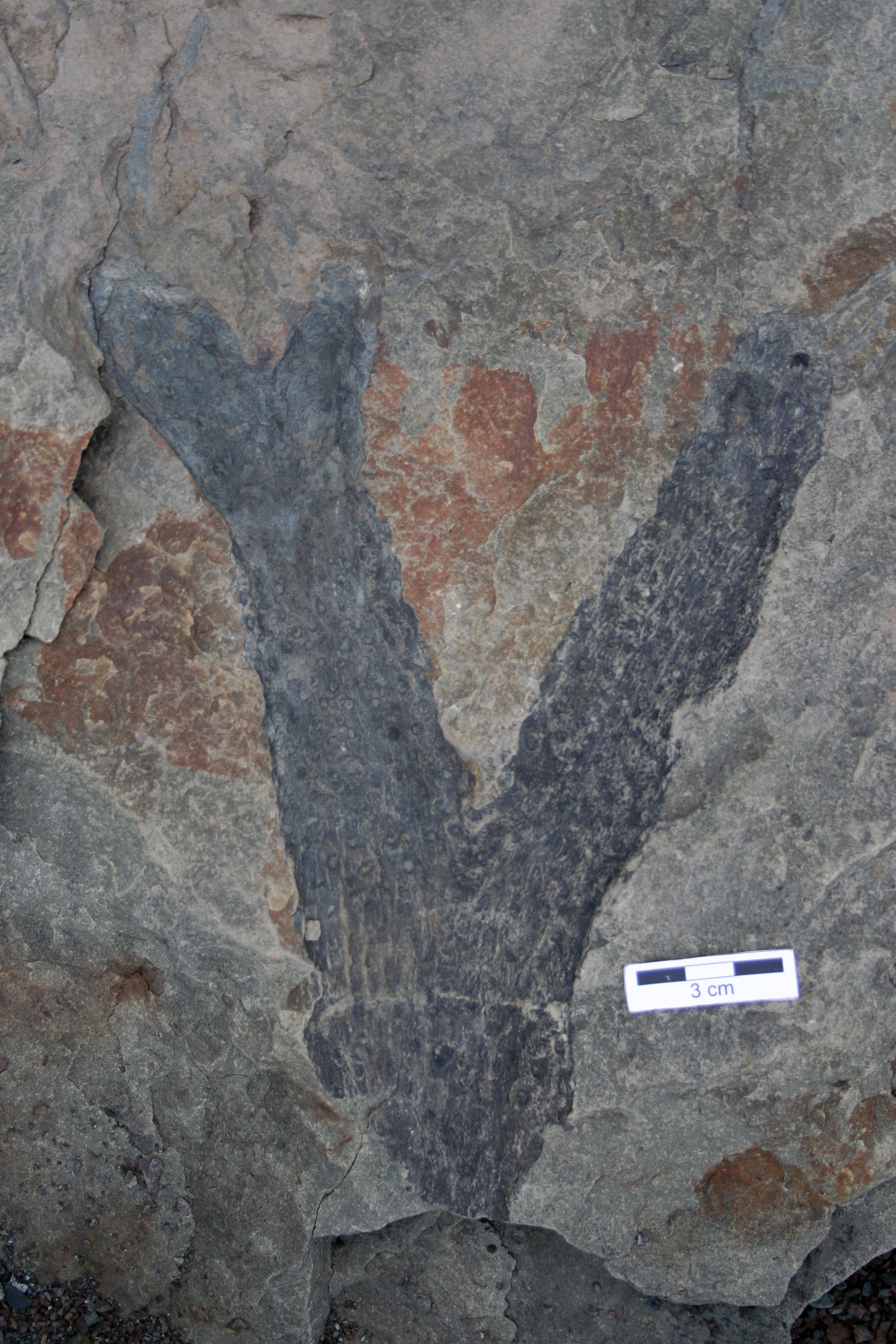
Stigmaria displaying branching pattern. Springhill Mines Formation (Pennsylvanian), Nova Scotia, Canada.

Stigmaria consists of four proximal axes connected to the trunk of arborescent lycophytes. The four proximal axes dichotomize, creating a long underground system ranging up to 15 m (49 ft) in radius, while being up to 40 cm (16 in) long and 0.5–1 cm (0.20–0.39 in) wide. The stigmarian rootlets consist of monarch vascular bundle enclosed by the inner and outer cortex. Evidently, the inner cortex and outer cortex is anchored by a hollow middle cortex, and a network of vascular branches extends between them.

Endarch is defined as the primary xylem of Stigmaria, and organized in forked vascular strands encompassed by vascular cambium. Tracheids of the secondary xylem are formed in spiral lines and consist of scalariform wall thickenings, while the fibrils are similar to those in the aerial branches. The scalariform tracheids along the stigmarian rhizomorph axes had lateral vascular and cork cambium as evidenced by its secondary xylem and meristematic tissues.

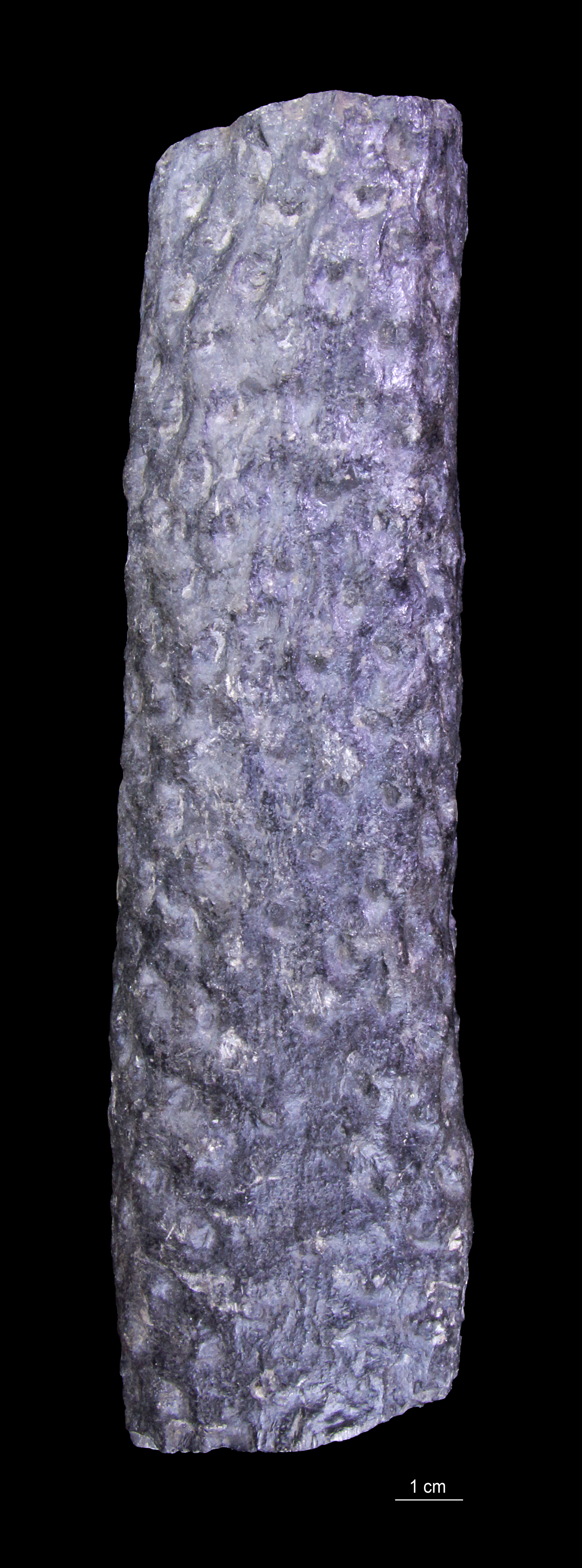
Stigmaria fossil casts commonly have a distinctive cylindrical shape with circular scars all around the stigmarian rhizome. From the Estonian Museum of Natural History, Tallinn, Estonia.

=== Development ===
Stigmaria development is linked to the changes in aerial stems found in typical rhizomic structures seen in present plants. Stigmaria's features are unrelated when connecting to present plant functionality. Moreover, the spiral structure of the stigmarian rootlet attachment is separate from the asymmetrical changes of roots and rhizomes commonly seen in modern plants. While there were lateral appendages in Stigmaria, none were found in the root systems of modern plants. However, fungi has mycorrhizae, which are functioned from cortical parenchyma cells.

Though vascular bundles in leaves are bilaterally symmetrical including the appendages of Stigmaria and the monarch vascular bundle, present rhizomes have a radial point of symmetric vascular tissues. Furthermore, within a certain growth stage, foliar abscission (active shedding) of the appendages occurs from the stigmarian axis. Nonetheless, root abscission is relatively absent in modern plants. The stigmarian rootlets have a similarity to arborescent lycophytes, with functions related to absorbent organs, branching, and forking of proximal axes.

Since many lycopsids from the Paleozoic had a height of up to 50 m (160 ft) meters, and grew in unsteady engulfed and saturated soil, the lycopods and their stigmarian system grew around the river systems. Therefore, it is debatable to how the underground system could handle the plants. Evidence to support their height was compared to the extensive stigmarian system. Thus, progression of the rhizomorph axes appeared to have secondary growth in their growth stages of the cortex. They may have been preferred to stand upright since arborescent lycophytes had bushy branches and only a few secondary xylem. The branches of neighboring lycopsids could interweave and deliver foundational support to the base stem. On the other hand, the branch density and development of the wood in present trees can prevent uprooting.

== Gallery ==
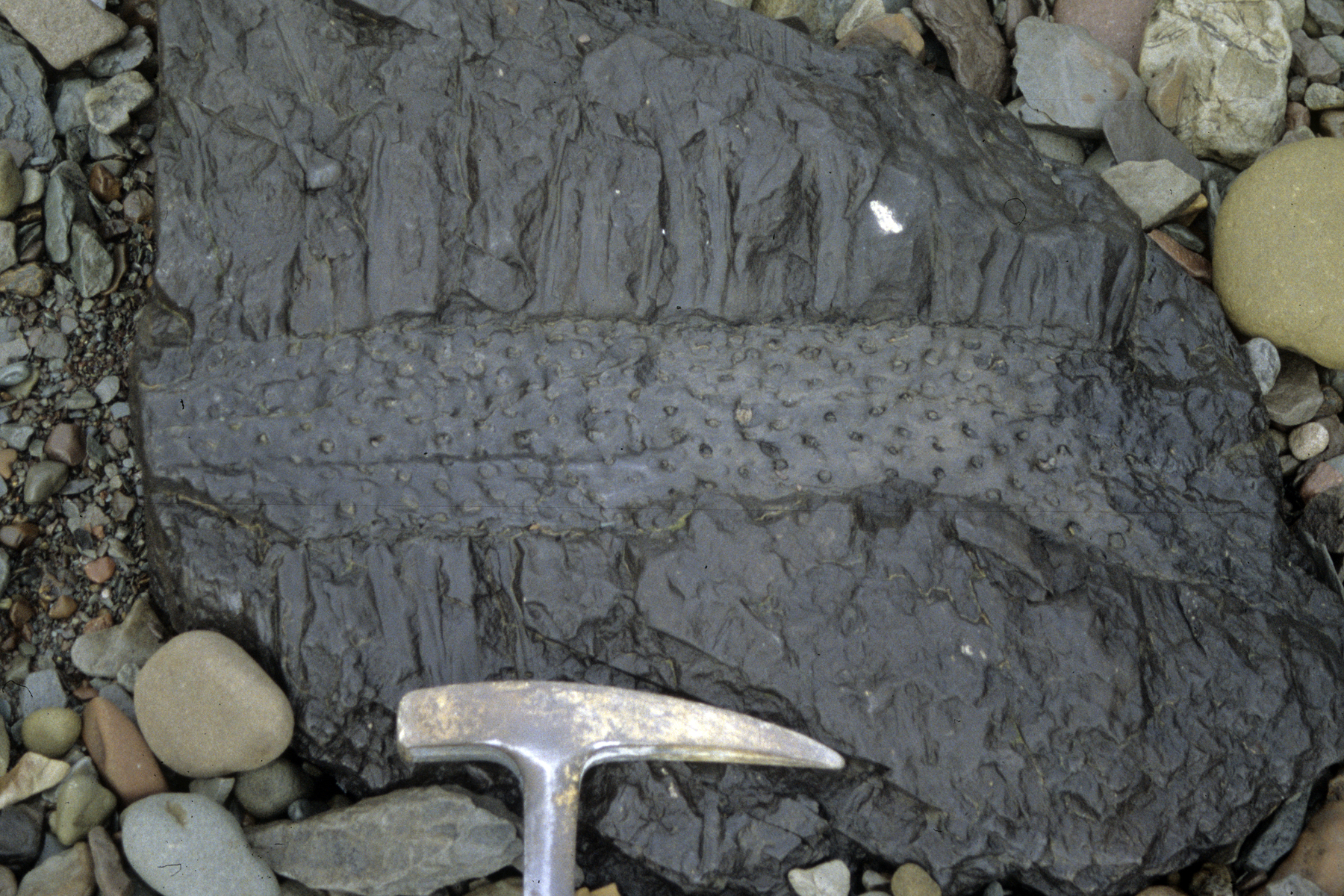
Bedding plane view of a flattened Stigmaria preserved atop a shallow-water carbonaceous limestone. Joggins, Nova Scotia, Canada.

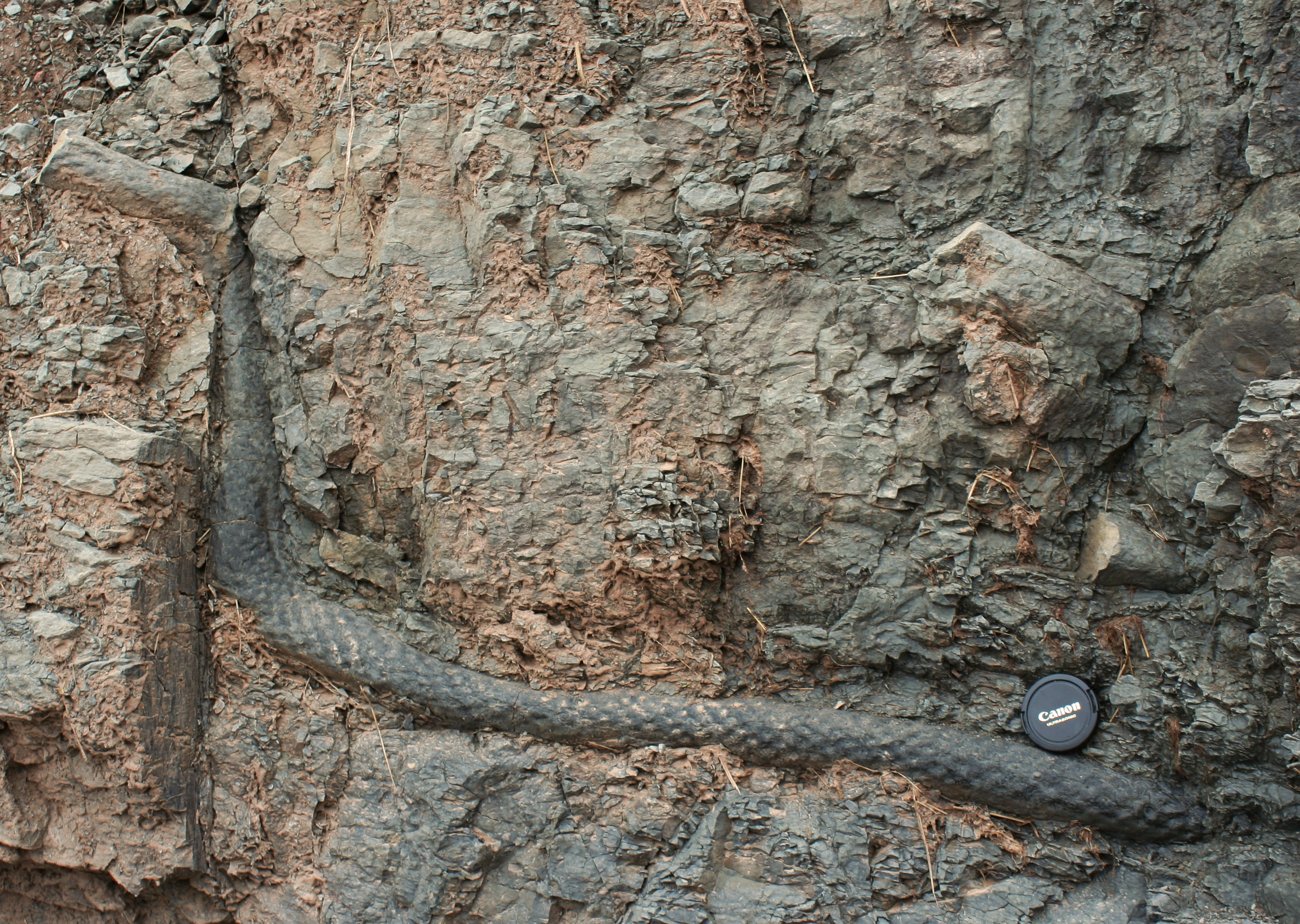
In situ Stigmaria fossil from the Joggins Formation (Pennsylvanian), Cumberland Basin, Nova Scotia, Canada

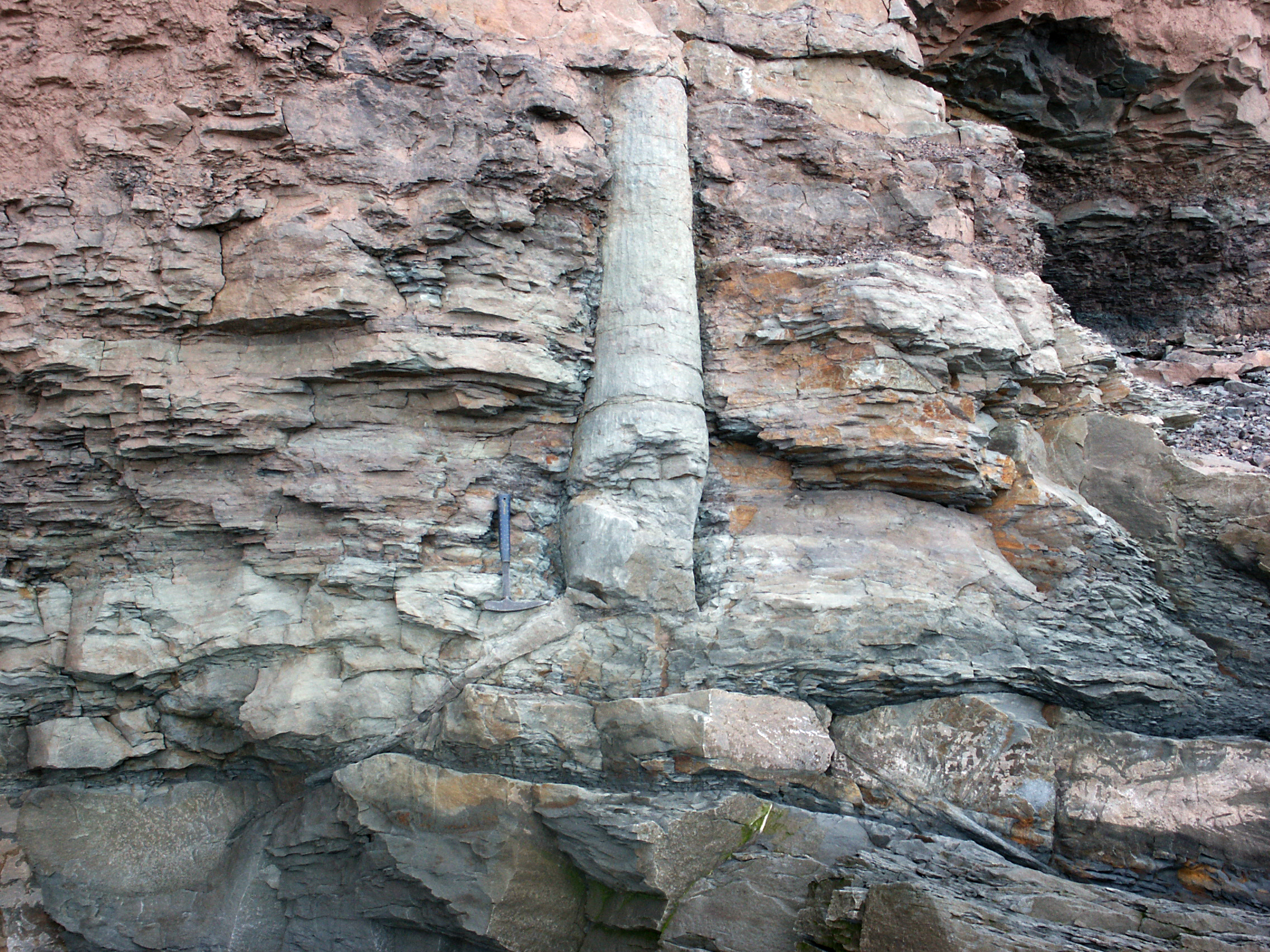
In situ lycopsid with attached stigmarian system from Joggins, Nova Scotia, Canada

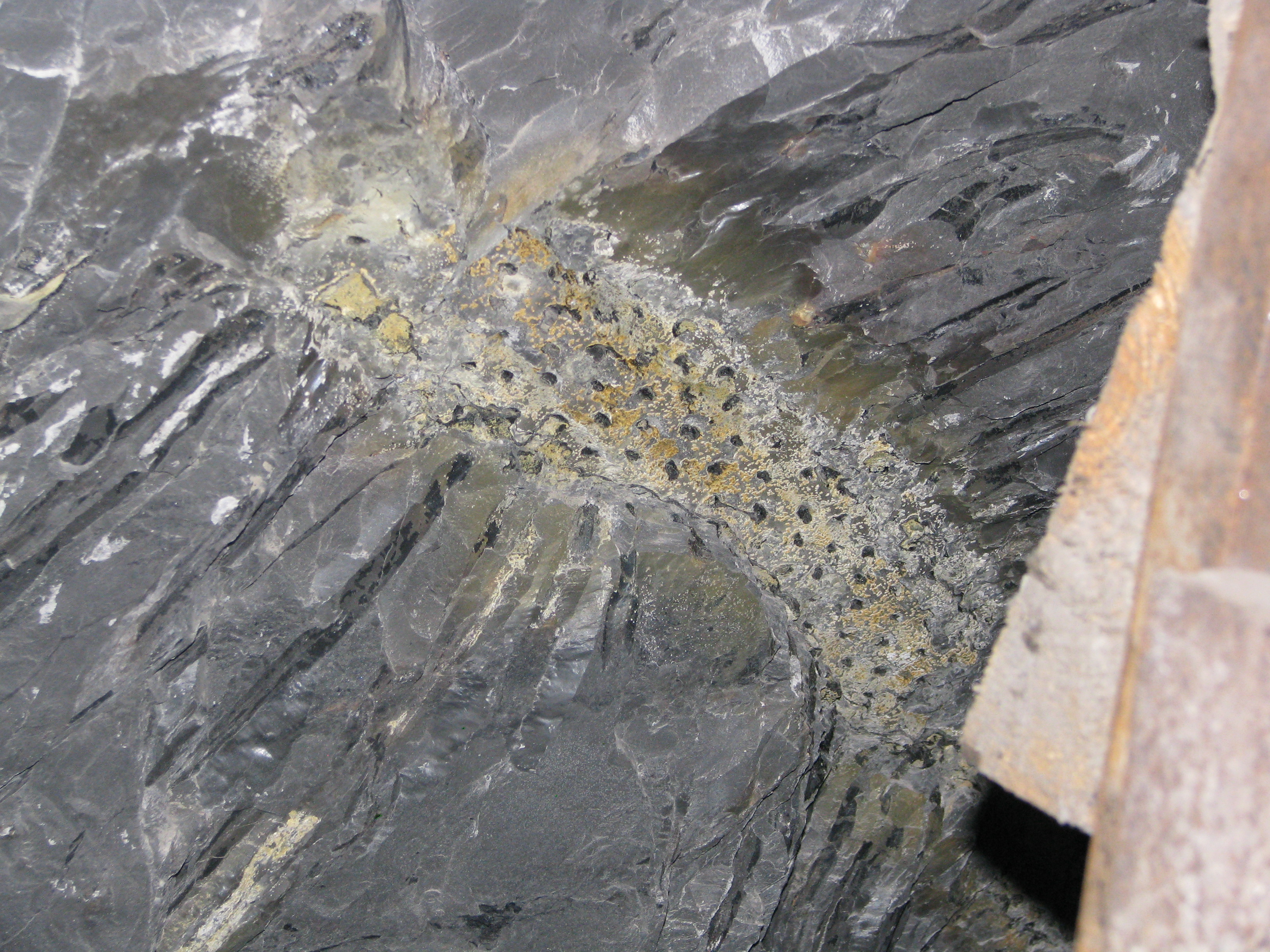
Stigmaria impression with visible rootlets connecting from the rhizome
