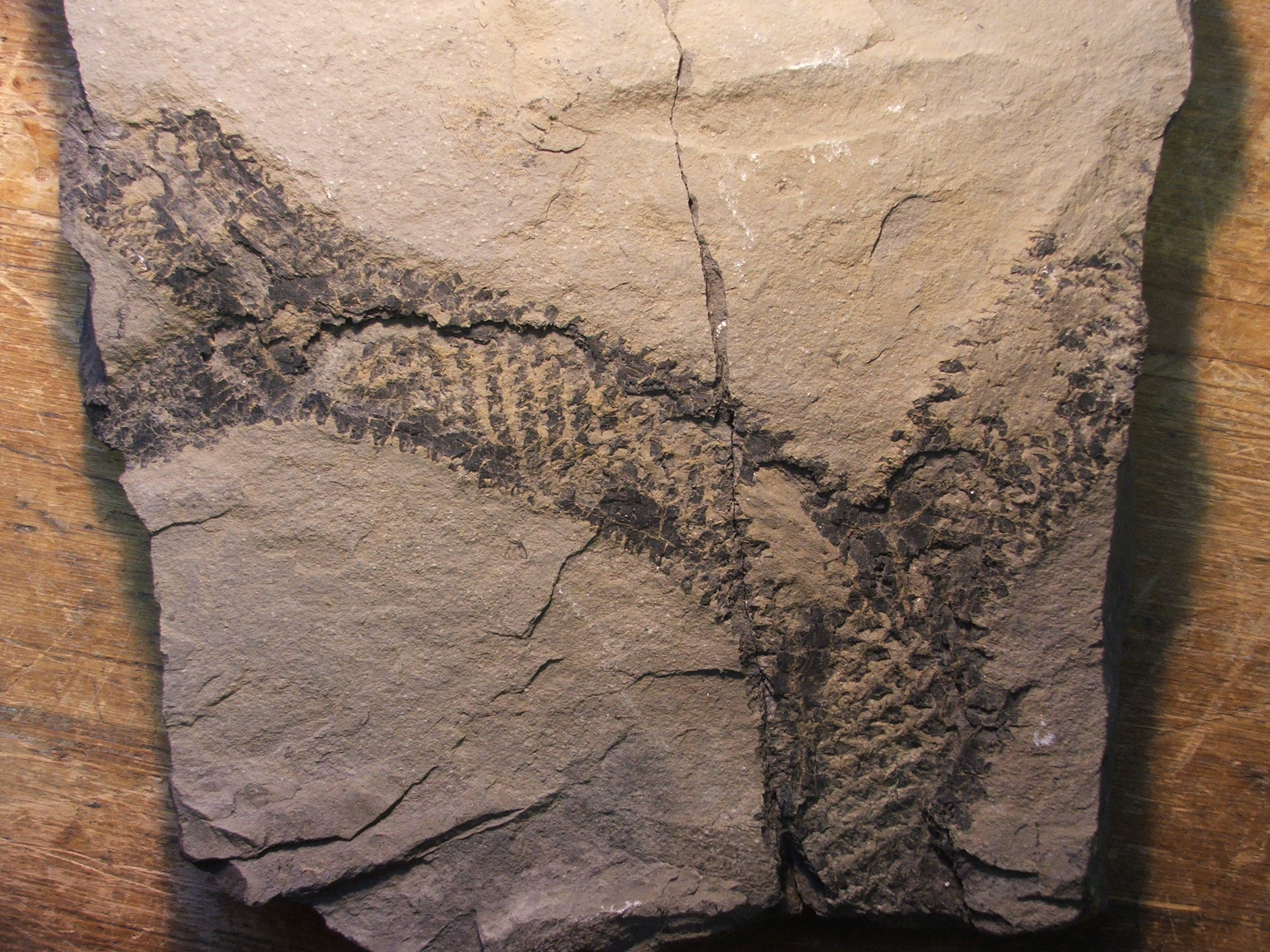
- A bifurcation in Lepidophloios

Scientific classification
- Kingdom: Plantae
- Clade: Tracheophytes
- Clade: Lycophytes
- Class: Lycopodiopsida
- Order: †Lepidodendrales

Genera
- Lepidodendron; Lepidophloios; Ulodendron; Sublepidophloios; Bothrodendron; Sigillaria; Hizemodendron; Diaphorodendron; Synchysidendron; Stigmaria (form genus used for roots)

= Lepidodendrales =

Lepidodendrales Temporal range: Carboniferous–Late Permian

Extinct order of vascular tree-like plants

Lepidodendrales (from the Greek for "scale tree") or arborescent lycophytes are an extinct order of primitive, vascular, heterosporous, arborescent (tree-like) plants belonging to Lycopodiopsida. Members of Lepidodendrales are the best understood of the fossil lycopsids due to the vast diversity of Lepidodendrales specimens and the diversity in which they were preserved; the extensive distribution of Lepidodendrales specimens as well as their well-preservedness lends paleobotanists exceptionally detailed knowledge of the coal-swamp giants’ reproductive biology, vegetative development, and role in their paleoecosystem. The defining characteristics of the Lepidodendrales are their secondary xylem, extensive periderm development, three-zoned cortex, rootlike appendages known as stigmarian rootlets arranged in a spiralling pattern, and megasporangium each containing a single functional megaspore that germinates inside the sporangium. Many of these different plant organs have been assigned both generic and specific names as relatively few have been found organically attached to each other. Some specimens have been discovered which indicate heights of 40 and even 50 meters and diameters of over 2 meters at the base. The massive trunks of some species branched profusely, producing large crowns of leafy twigs; though some leaves were up to 1 meter long, most were much shorter, and when leaves dropped from branches their conspicuous leaf bases remained on the surface of branches. Strobili could be found at the tips of distal branches or in an area at the top of the main trunk. The underground organs of Lepidodendrales typically consisted of dichotomizing axes bearing helically arranged, lateral appendages serving an equivalent function to roots. Sometimes called "giant club mosses", they are believed to be more closely related to extant quillworts (Isoetes) based on xylem (and consequently sometimes placed within the Isoetales rather than within their own order), although fossil specimens of extinct Selaginellales from the Late Carboniferous also had secondary xylem.

== Morphology ==
Lepidodendrales had tall, thick trunks that rarely branched and were topped with a crown of bifurcating branches bearing clusters of leaves. These leaves were long and narrow, similar to large blades of grass, and were spirally-arranged. The vascular system of the erect trunk was unusual in that it switched its morphological development as the plant grew. The young trunk began as a protostele in which the outer xylem matured first (exarch), but the later and higher portion of the trunk developed as an ectophloic siphonostele in which the xylem was flanked by phloem tissue on both its inner and outer side.

=== Stem structure ===
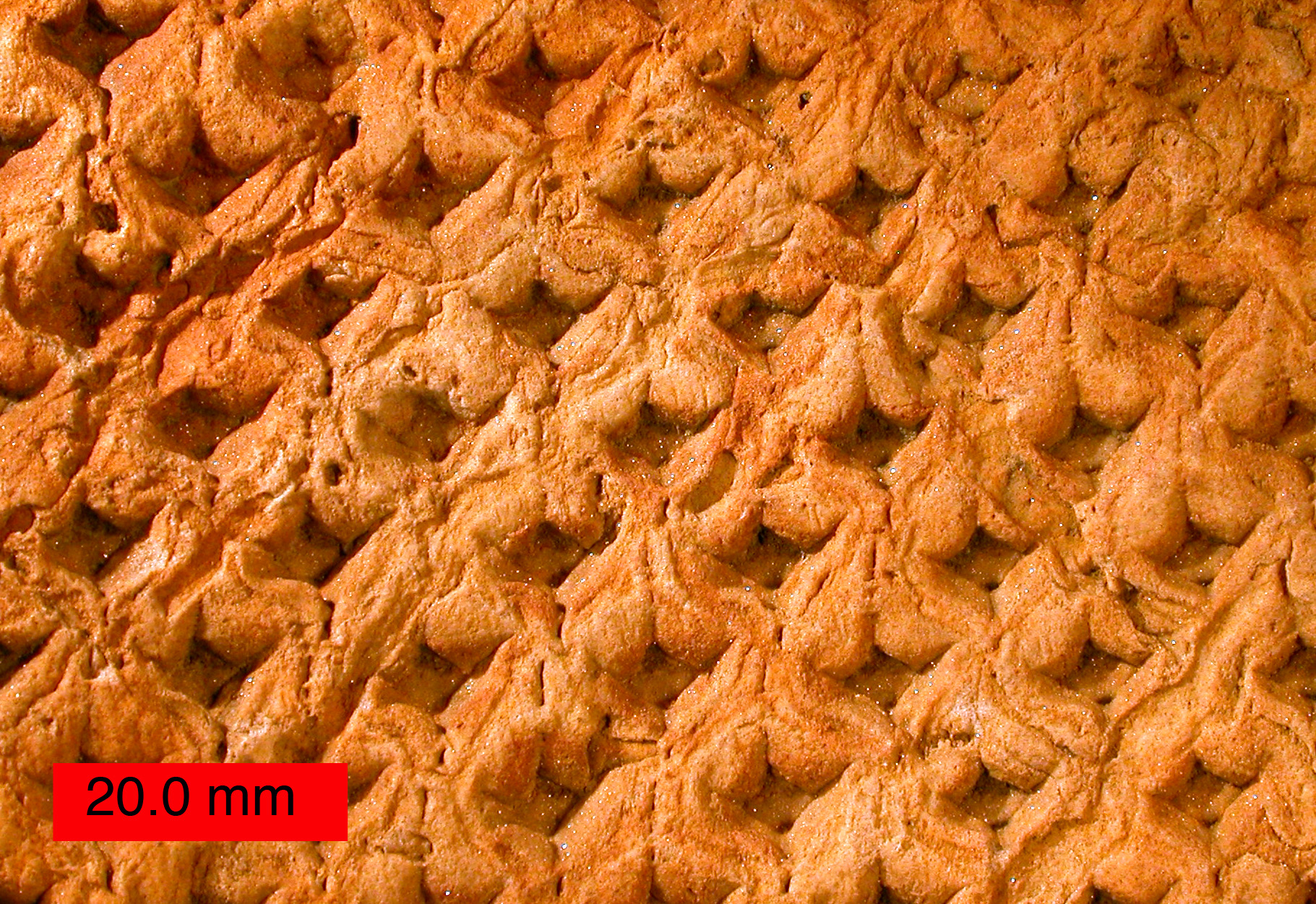
External mold of Lepidodendron from the Upper Carboniferous of Ohio.

The most common fossil specimens of Lepidodendrales, as well as the most recognizable, are the compressions of stem surfaces marked with constant, though partially asymmetric, rhomboidal leaf cushions. These fossils look much like tire tracks or alligator skin, lending the Greek name "Lepidodendrales," meaning "scale trees." These leaf cushions are actually the expanded leaf base which remained after the leaves fell, as the abscission of the leaf was not flush to the stem surface. The rhomboidal shape arises from the acute angle of the top and bottom of the cushions, known as leaf bolsters, and the rounded angle of the side. The actual leaf scar is present slightly above the midpoint of the cushion and is roughly elliptical in shape. On the leaf scar, three small pitted impressions can sometimes be found. The central and always present pit results from a vascular bundle that extended into the leaf from the stem, known as "parichnos," a system of aerating tissues. Two other parichnos channels can be found on Lepidodendron stem surfaces, though these do not occur in the Diaphorodendraceae. Above the leaf scar is a mark from a former ligule. A waxy cuticle covered the stem surface, including leaf cushions but not including the stem scars. The simple epidermis lacks specialized cells like trichomes or epidermal glands. Stomata are frequent and sunken in shallow depressions.

Stems of Lepidodendrales could be protostelic, as in Diaphorodendron, have a mixed pith, or be siphonostelic, as in Diaphorodendron and Lepidodendron. In mixed pith stems, parenchyma cells are scattered while tracheids are placed in the middle, though the tracheids exist in a short, squat, parenchymatous shape; this is cited as evidence that the pith in Lepidodendrales originated as immature parenchymatous cells which failed to properly differentiate into tracheids. Around the primary xylem of Lepidodendrales may be a secondary xylem, which can be several centimeters thick. Unlike modern woody trees, the secondary xylem of Lepidodendrales is only a small portion of the diameter of the stem, as the extensively developed periderm is responsible for the large trunks. The primary and secondary xylem tracheids are scalariform and have Williamson striations, or fimbrils, between these scalariform lines. The fimbrils characterize wood in arborescent lycopsids, though similar structures occur in modern club and spike mosses, and these fimbrils are a shared structure for all lycopsids. Bordering outside the secondary xylem is a section of cells with thin walls, representing the vascular cambium. Though modern seed plants have a bifacial cambium, the Lepidodendrids have a unifacial cambium, producing a secondary xylem only on their inner face. The phloem zone is separated from this secondary xylem by a section of thin-walled cells known as the "parenchyma sheath." Current evidence suggests that there was no secondary phloem present within arborescent lycopsids. The cortex of Lepidodendrids typically consisted of the inner, middle, and outer cortex, distinguished by their cell types. The inner cortex is the narrowest and consists of small parenchyma cells; secretory cells, lacunae, and various sclerotic cells also can be found in this section. The middle cortex is larger and in turn consists of larger parenchyma cells. This section is characterized by radially extending lacunae in young stems, while in older stems the middle cortex is usually not preserved save for a few parenchyma cells. The outer cortex has no definite arrangement, but its cells have slightly thicker walls. The periderm is produced in the outer cortex. The periderm is bizonate in Diaphorodendron, where the inner zone consists of alternatingly thick and thin walled cells, and the outer zone contains dark, "resinous" cells. The homogenous or bizonate periderm is massive in Lepidodendron. The loose construction of the cortex and the large amounts of thin-walled periderm contributed to the sloughing of tissue layers during the fossilization process. This led to a variety of decorticated fossils often presumed to be external stem and trunk features but lacking leaf cushions and other features. Various generic names have been given to decorticated specimens, including Knorria, a name for stems with nearly all tissues outside the xylem absent.

The pattern of stem growth in Lepidodendrales can be reconstructed by analyzing their cortical growth patterns. When plants are immature, the cortex is extensive and the outer stem surface is covered with many rows of leaf bases. As the tree continues to grow, the secondary xylem and periderm originate from the vascular cambium and phellogen. This increase in stem tissue and stem diameter results in the sloughing off of outer tissues including leaf bases; hence, in older areas of the plant the outer surface of the trunk is protected by the periderm. Many older drawings of Lepidodendron incorrectly illustrate leaf bases extending to the ground in older trees. At higher, younger levels of the tree, the branches have fewer rows of smaller leaves. In these sections less secondary xylem and periderm are produced. This reduction in stele size and secondary tissue production continues to taper towards the most distal branches, where only a tiny protostele, no secondary tissues, and few rows of leaves exist; this distal stage of development is known as "apoxogenesis." These small, distal twigs cannot develop into larger branches over time, a growth pattern known as determinate growth; this contrasts with the modern indeterminate growth pattern of most modern woody plants.

=== Leaf structure ===
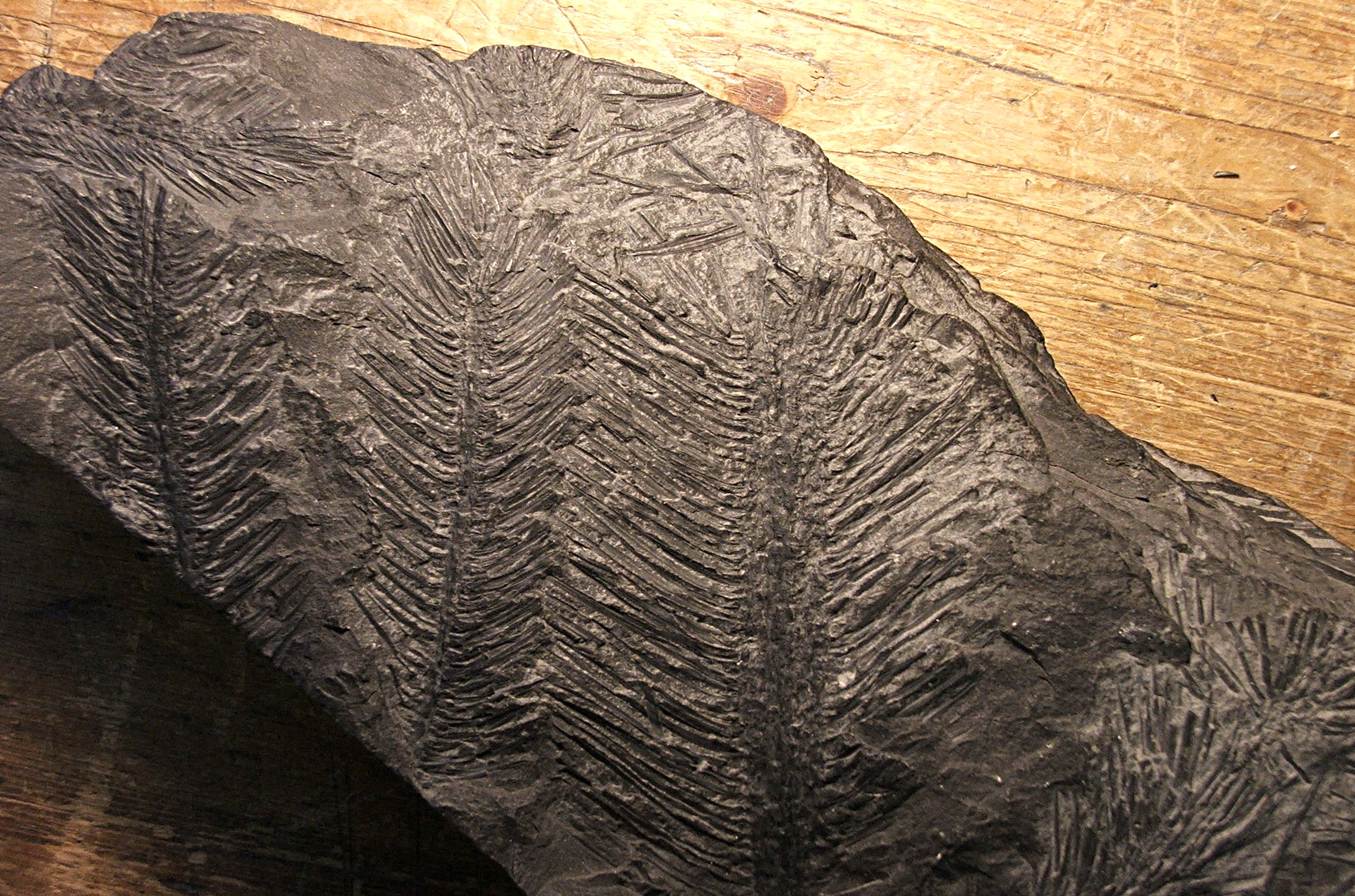
Leaf of Lepidodendron

Leaves of Lepidodendrales plants are linear, with some 1–2 m (3 ft 3 in – 6 ft 7 in) long. Stems with the largest diameters have the longest leaves, a pattern correlated with the determinate growth of the plants. Many organ taxa established for detached Lepidodendrales leaves were likely produced by the same kind of plant and differ in morphology only because of their position on the plant. The generic name Lepidophyllum is the original name for preserved Lepidodendrid leaves, but as this name had already been used for a separate flowering plant, the name Lepidophylloides is used today instead. Along the entire lamina of Lepidophylloides, a single vascular bundle is bordered by shallow grooves on the abaxial surface. Stomata are sunken in pits aligned in rows parallel to these grooves. A hypodermal zone of fibers surrounds the vascular bundle of the leaf.

=== Underground organs ===
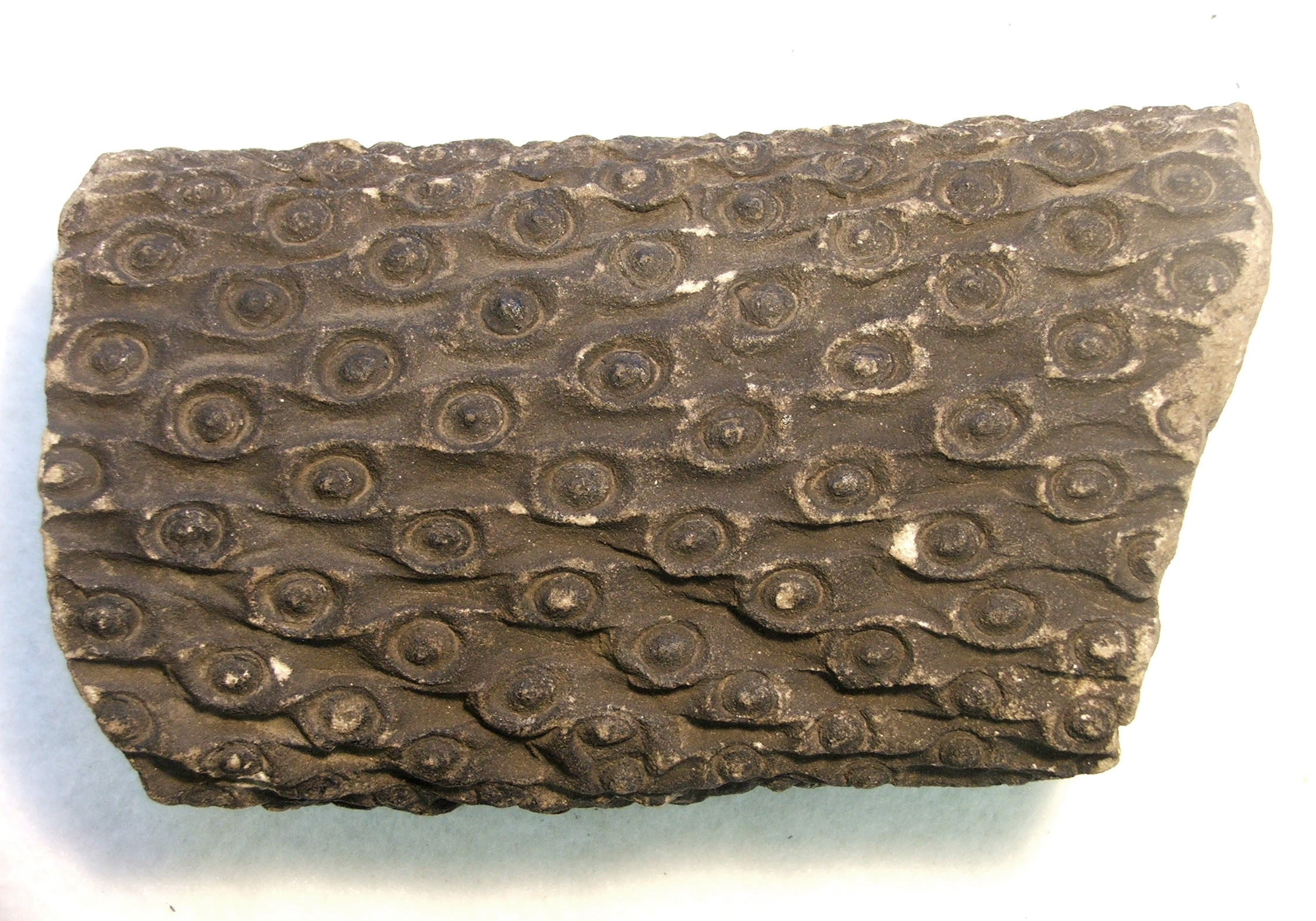
Stigmaria of a Lepidodendralean. Top view.

The underground organs of the Lepidodendrales are assigned the generic name Stigmaria. These structures are one of the most common lycopsid fossils and are the main organ found in the clay layer beneath most Carboniferous coal deposits; this clay layer represents the soil layer which the plants were rooted in. Despite the existence of multiple species of Stigmaria, our understanding of the underground organs is based primarily on the widespread species Stigmaria ficoides. The stigmarian organs originate from the base of the trunk as four major axes extending horizontally, leading to a relatively shallow rooting system. Lateral appendages are attached to each axis in a helical pattern. These appendages would abscise as the plant grew, resulting in the characteristic circular external scars of Stigmaria fossil specimens. Although these appendages are often called "stigmarian rootlets," their helical arrangement and growth abscission are actually more characteristic of leaves than modern lateral roots. The four primary axes of Stigmaria dichotomize often, forming an extensive underground system possibly ranging up to 15 m (49 ft) in radius. The rootlets range in size, being up to 40 cm (16 in) long and 0.5–1 cm (0.20–0.39 in) wide, and typically taper distally and do not dichotomize. A small monarch vascular strand is present in each rootlet, surrounded by a compact inner cortex. Outside this inner cortex is a hollow middle cortex and a thin outer cortex; sometimes a connection extends from the inner cortex to the outer cortex. The primary xylem of Stigmaria is endarch and arranged in a series of bands surrounded by vascular cambium. The secondary xylem tracheids are arranged in radial lines and contain scalariform wall thickenings with fimbrils identical to those in the aerial branches. No secondary phloem has been found in Stigmaria fossil specimens, and the vascular cambium was unifacial with translocation enabled by the primary phloem. The radially aligned tracheids in most Stigmaria axes were produced by a thickening meristem rather than a vascular cambium.

The development of underground organs of Lepidodendrales was likely similar to the development of the aerial stems. However, some features of these organs have yet to be identified in function and some modern features of roots are absent in Stigmaria. The helical arrangement of the rootlet appendages is unlike the irregular arrangement of modern roots. No root hairs have been identified, though fungi in some cortical parenchyma cells may have functioned as mycorrhizae. The monarch vascular bundle in the rootlets is bilaterally symmetrical, but modern roots have radially symmetrical vascular tissue, though vascular bundles in leaves are bilaterally symmetrical. In addition, the rootlets underwent abscission from the axis regularly as the plant grew in a similar fashion to the process of foliar abscission. However, root abscission is unknown in modern plants. These features of the rootlets suggest that they are homologous to the aerial leaves of Lepidodendrales but modified to serve anchoring and absorbing functions. This implies that the underground organs of the plants arose as evolutionary modification of the aerial organs.

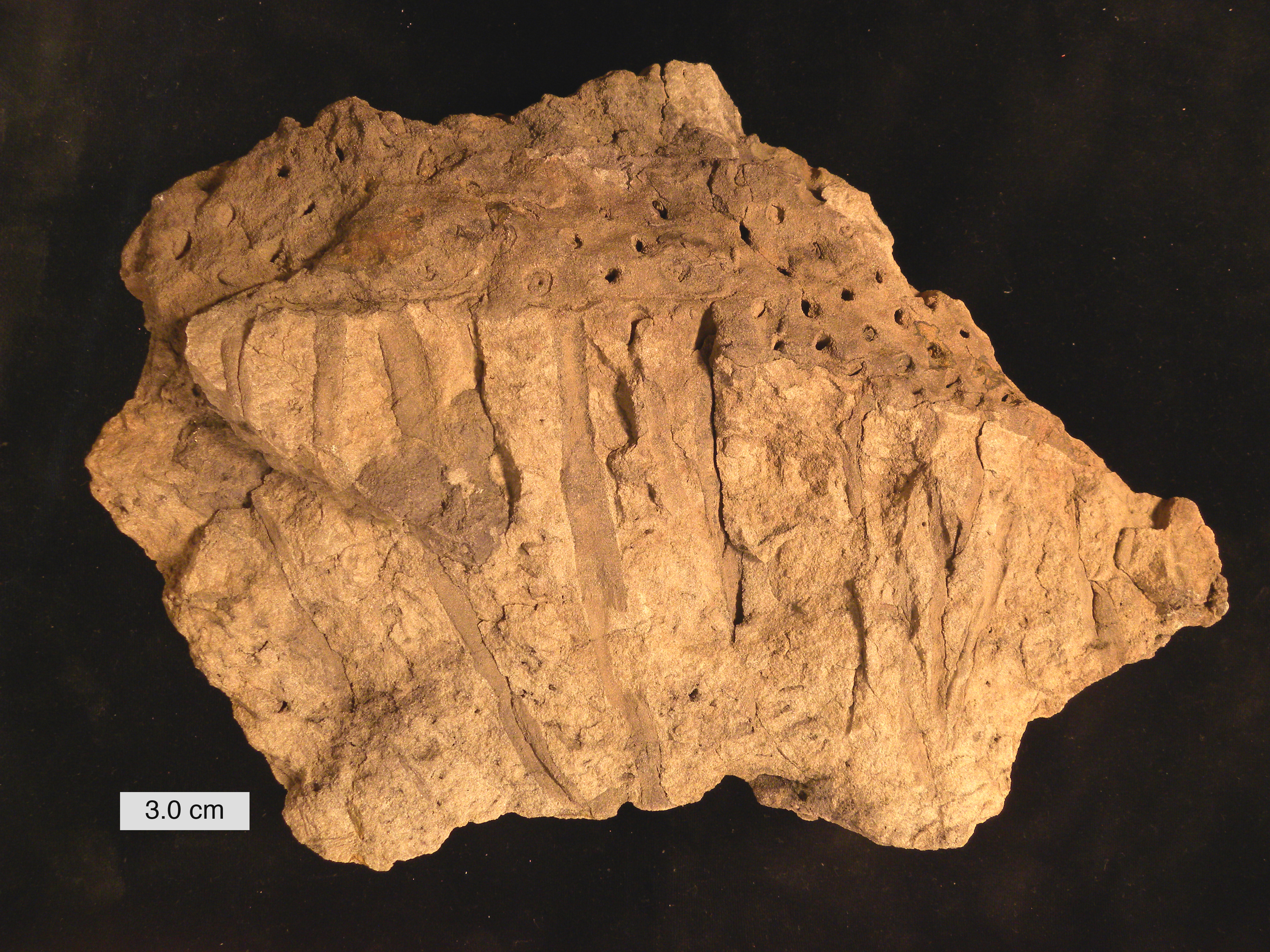
Stigmaria with rootlets

Despite the towering 40 m (130 ft) height of some Lepidodendrales plants, their stigmarian system was typically shallow, and therefore it is dubious how the underground organs could support the huge trees, especially since many plants grew in supersaturated, watery soil that was largely unstable. Different suggestions have arisen to explain their stature and root system: it may be that the extensive horizontal growth of the root axes provided enough support, or that the crowns of adjacent trees could entangle and provide mutual support. The nature of the wood and density of the crown of modern trees can have a large effect on tree uprooting, and since arborescent lycopsids had little secondary xylem and bushy crowns they may have been better suited to standing upright.

=== Reproductive organs ===
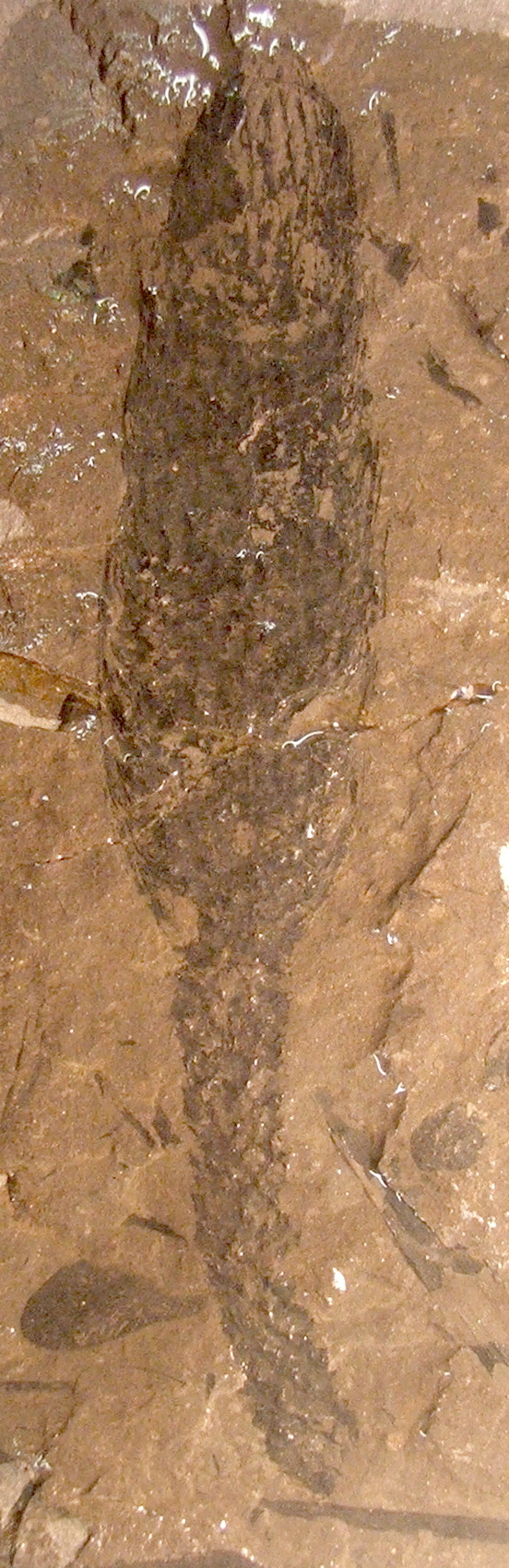
A reproductive cone, Lepidostrobus variabilis

The reproductive organs of the Lepidodendrids consisted of strobili or cones on distal branches in the crown. In Synchysidendron the cones occur on late-formed crown branches, while in Diaphorodendron the cones occur on deciduous lateral branches. The cones could grow to be considerably large, as in Lepidostrobus goldernbergii specimens are over 50 cm (20 in) long. The cones consist of a central axis with sporophylls arranged helically; sporangia are on the adaxial surface of the sporophylls and are upturned distally to overlap sporophylls above. Part of the sporophyll typically extends downward to create a heel or other distal extension. A ligule can be found in a small pit distal to the sporangium. Though Lepidostrobus is the most common name for Lepidodendrales cones, the name has been used for specimens of any form of preservation and for both monosporangiate and bisporangiate forms, so taxonomic problems often ensue. Attempts to dissuade these taxonomic confusions have been made. Some have suggested the name Lepidostrobus should only describe monosporangiate cones and the name Flemingites describe bisporangiate cones, while others have used cone morphology to attempt to better differentiate species within Lepidostrobus.

Embryo specimens have been found in the cone Bothrodendrostrobus. The embryo begins as an unvascularized globular structure found within megagametophyte tissue, and in more mature specimens two vascularized appendages extend through the trilete suture, representing the first shoot and first root. Gametophyte generation of Lepidodendrales is poorly understood and based on few specimens, but the Flemingites schopfii cones exhibit well-preserved signs of the micro and megagametophyte phases. Compared to gametophytes of modern lycopsids, F. schopfii has microgametophytes most similar to extant Selaginella, while the megagametophytes are more similar to Isoetes. Other well-preserved Lepidodendrid gametophytes have been found in spores of Lepidodendron rhodumnense fossilized in chert from the late Viséan.

== Growth ==
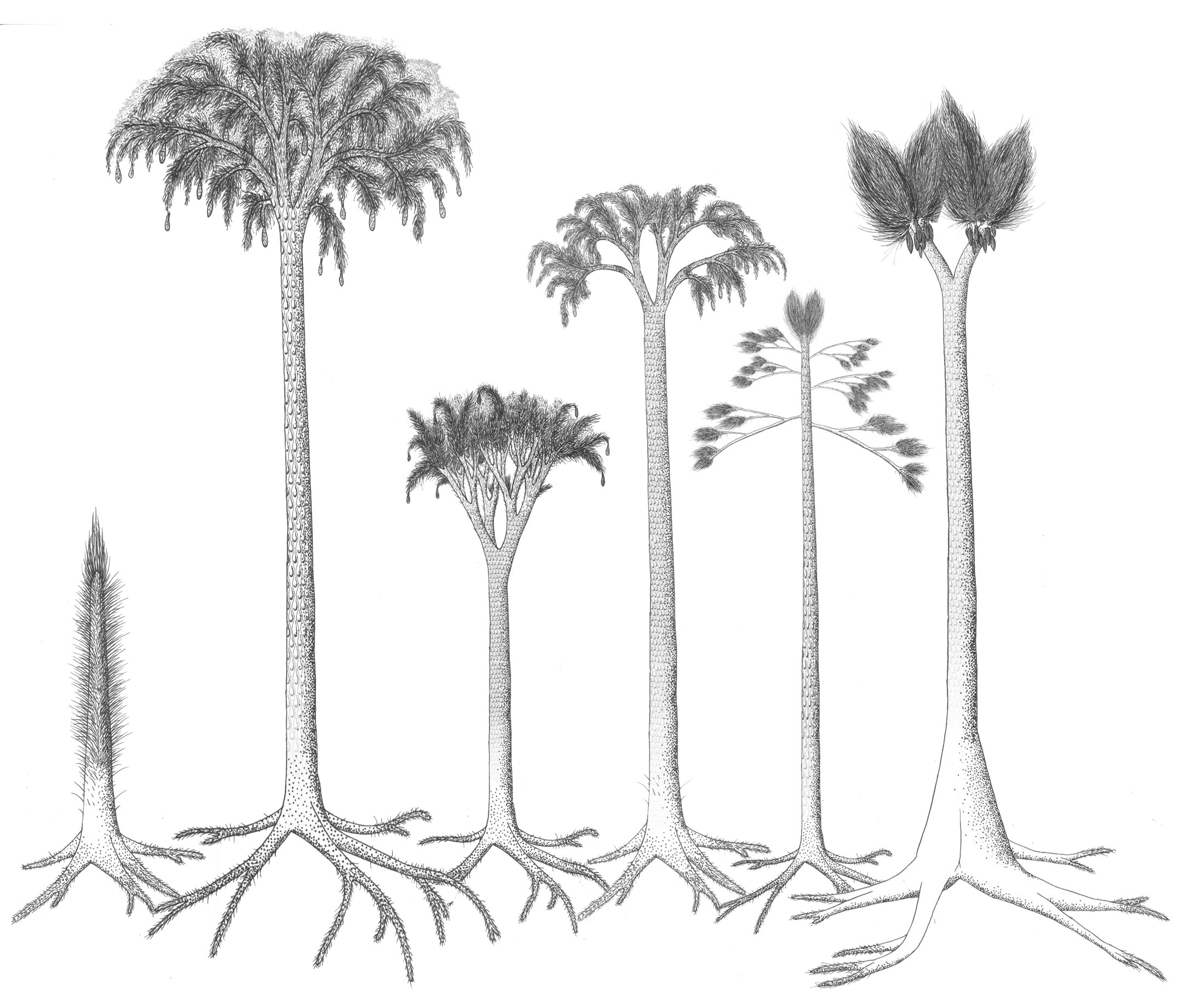
Growth habit of Lepidodendrales: from left to right, juvenile lepidoendralean, Lepidodendron, Lepidophloios, Synchysidendron, Diaphorodendron and Sigillaria

During the early stages of growth, arborescent lycophytes grew as unbranched trunks, with the leaves growing directly out of the leaf cushions/bases. Later in the growth cycle, depending on the species, the trunk produced either a series of laterally (perpendicular to the trunk) growing branches with a dichotomising growth pattern, or a crown of dichotomising branches. Some Sigillaria species are suggested to not have branched at all. During the later stages of growth, the leaf laminae on the lower portions of the trunk were shed, though the rate of shedding was not rapid, as large stems have been found with the leaves remaining attached. The leaf bases remained on the trunk until in the largest stems they were sloughed off to expose the periderm. The rate of growth of arborescent lycophytes is disputed, some authors contend that they had a rapid life cycle, growing to their maximum size, reproducing and then dying in only 10 to 15 years, while other authors argue that these growth rates are overestimated. It has been proposed that arborescent lycophytes had a similar carbon fixation mechanism to modern quillworts, where carbon was uptaken from the surrounding sediment, and enriched carbon dioxide concentrations within internal gas spaces allowed increased carbon absorption. Most parts of the plant, including the leaves, stems and parts of the rooting rhizophore structures, were likely photosynthetic.

== Ecology and evolution ==
Arborescent lycophytes are suggested to have had a preference for disturbed habitats. The large quantities of biomass that were responsible for the formation of globally widespread Carboniferous coal seams were predominantly produced by arborescent lycophytes. Lepidodendrales are suggested to be responsible for almost 70% of the plant material in the Westphalian coal-swamp forests of America, though at the end of the Westphalian period Lepidodendrales members were in decline and had become responsible for only 5% of coal biomass.

Arborescent lycopsids were largely extinct in North America and Europe by the end of the Carboniferous as a result of the Carboniferous Rainforest Collapse, though arborescent lycopsids persisted in the wetland rainforests of Cathaysia (part of what is now China) until the end of the Permian and the major Permian-Triassic extinction event. By the end of the Permian they were relatively rare and marginal elements of Cathaysian wetland forests that did not form the main coal-bearing plants in these ecosystems, in strong contrast to their previous dominance during much of the late Carboniferous to early Permian.

Some scientists have suggested that the decline of lepidodendraleans was as a result of Variscan tectonic activity creating unstable conditions by reducing the size of the coal-swamp ecosystems, while others suggest that their decline was due to climate change; some scientists suggest a combination of these theories, that tectonic activity caused changes in floral composition which triggered climate change, in turn resulting in this decline.

== Taxonomy ==
Amongst Lycopodiopsida, Lepidodendrales are considered to be more closely related to Isoetales (which includes modern quillworts) than to club mosses or spikemosses. Some authors do not use Lepidodendrales, and instead include arborescent lycophytes within Isoetales.

=== Species ===
Various specimens of Lepidodendrales have been historically categorized as members of Lepidodendron, a genus defined by morphology of leaf cushions. DiMichele established Diaphorodendron to dissuade ambiguity over these widely ranging specimens, which includes some structurally preserved specimens which were previously members of Lepidodendron. Diaphorodendron was later divided into the two genera Diaphorodendron and Synchysidendron, and the genera were placed in the new family Diaphorodendraceae. Synapomorphies of this new family are a medullated protostele and a dorsiventrally flattened megasporangium. Synapomorphies of the family Lepidodendraceae are a bilaterally flattened megasporangium and infrafoliar parichnos which extend below the leaf scar. The generic names Lepidodendron and Diaphorodendron today describe both cellularly preserved stem segments and entire plants, including their foliar organs, underground organs, and reproductive organs. Specifically, the generic name Lepidodendron is typically used to describe compression specimens which feature a particular type of leaf cushion morphology.

In addition, many "organ taxa" have been identified to the Lepidodendrales: roots (Stigmaria), leaves, and cones (Lepidostrobus) were originally given a different genus and species name before it could be shown that they belonged to the same organism.

== See also ==
- Glossopteris
- Archaeopteris
