= Crassulacean acid metabolism =

Metabolic process

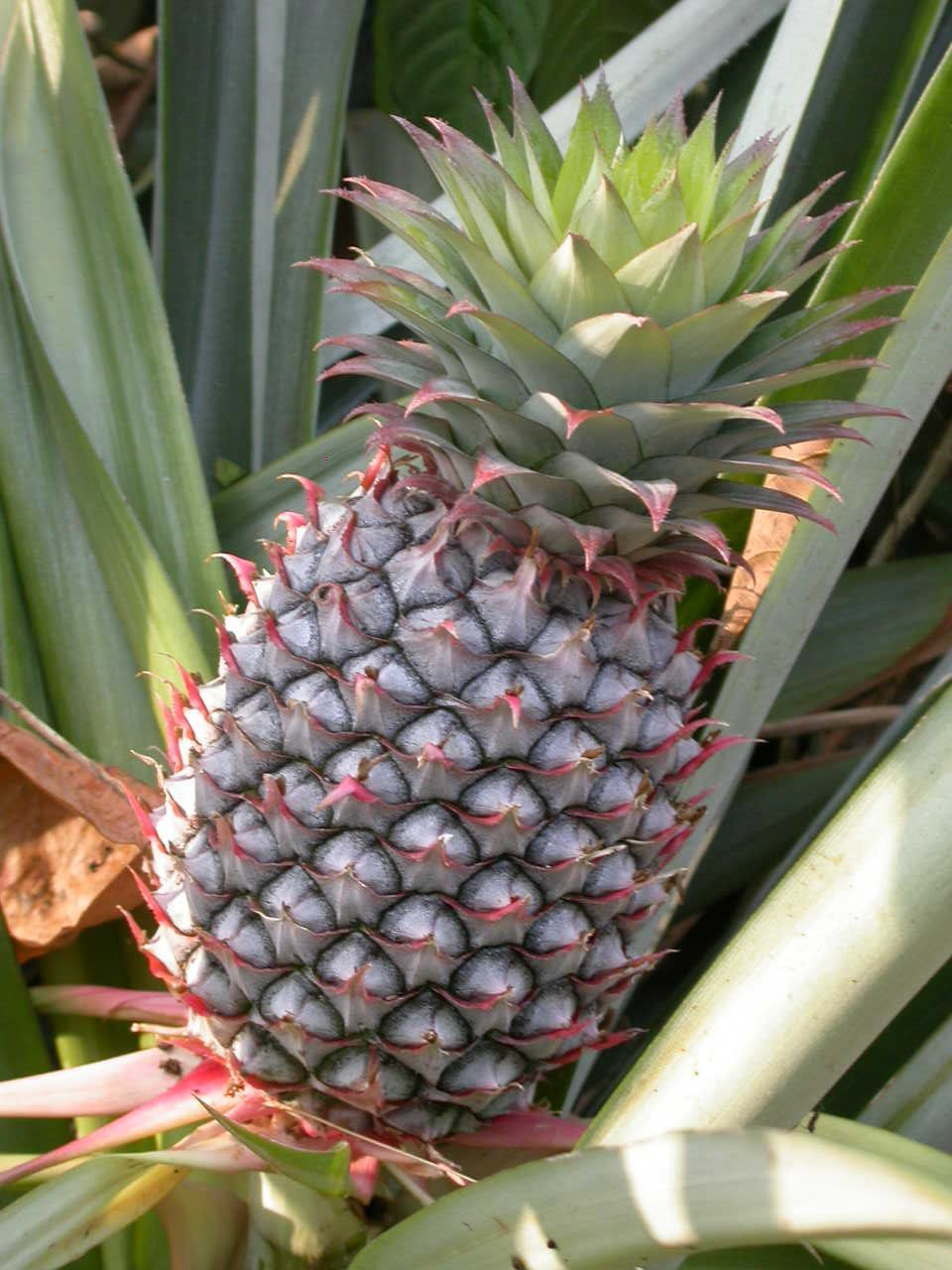
The pineapple is an example of a CAM plant.

Crassulacean acid metabolism, also known as CAM photosynthesis, is a carbon fixation pathway that evolved in some plants as an adaptation to arid conditions that allows a plant to photosynthesize during the day, but only exchange gases at night. In a plant using full CAM, the stomata in the leaves remain shut during the day to reduce transpiration, but they open at night to collect carbon dioxide (CO_{2}) and allow it to diffuse into the mesophyll cells. The CO_{2} is stored as four-carbon malic acid in vacuoles at night, and then in the daytime, the malate is transported to chloroplasts where it is converted back to CO_{2}, which is then used during photosynthesis. The pre-collected CO_{2} is concentrated around the enzyme RuBisCO, increasing photosynthetic efficiency. This mechanism of acid metabolism was first discovered in plants of the family Crassulaceae.

== Historical background ==
Observations relating to CAM were first made by de Saussure in 1804 in his Recherches Chimiques sur la Végétation. Benjamin Heyne in 1812 noted that Bryophyllum leaves in India were acidic in the morning and tasteless by afternoon. These observations were studied further and refined by Aubert, E. in 1892 in his Recherches physiologiques sur les plantes grasses and expounded upon by Richards, H. M. 1915 in Acidity and Gas Interchange in Cacti, Carnegie Institution. The term CAM may have been coined by Ranson and Thomas in 1940, but they were not the first to discover this cycle. It was observed by the botanists Ranson and Thomas, in the succulent family Crassulaceae (which includes jade plants and Sedum). The name "Crassulacean acid metabolism" refers to acid metabolism in Crassulaceae, and not the metabolism of "crassulacean acid"; there is no chemical by that name.

== Overview: a two-part cycle ==
Overview of CAM

CAM is an adaptation that enables more efficient use of water, and so is typically found in plants growing in arid conditions. (CAM is found in over 99% of the known 1700 species of Cactaceae and in nearly all of the cacti producing edible fruits.)

=== During the night ===
During the night, a plant employing CAM has its stomata open, which allows CO_{2} to enter and be fixed as organic acids by a PEP reaction similar to the C_{4} pathway. The resulting organic acids are stored in vacuoles for later use, as the Calvin cycle cannot operate without ATP and NADPH, products of light-dependent reactions that do not take place at night.

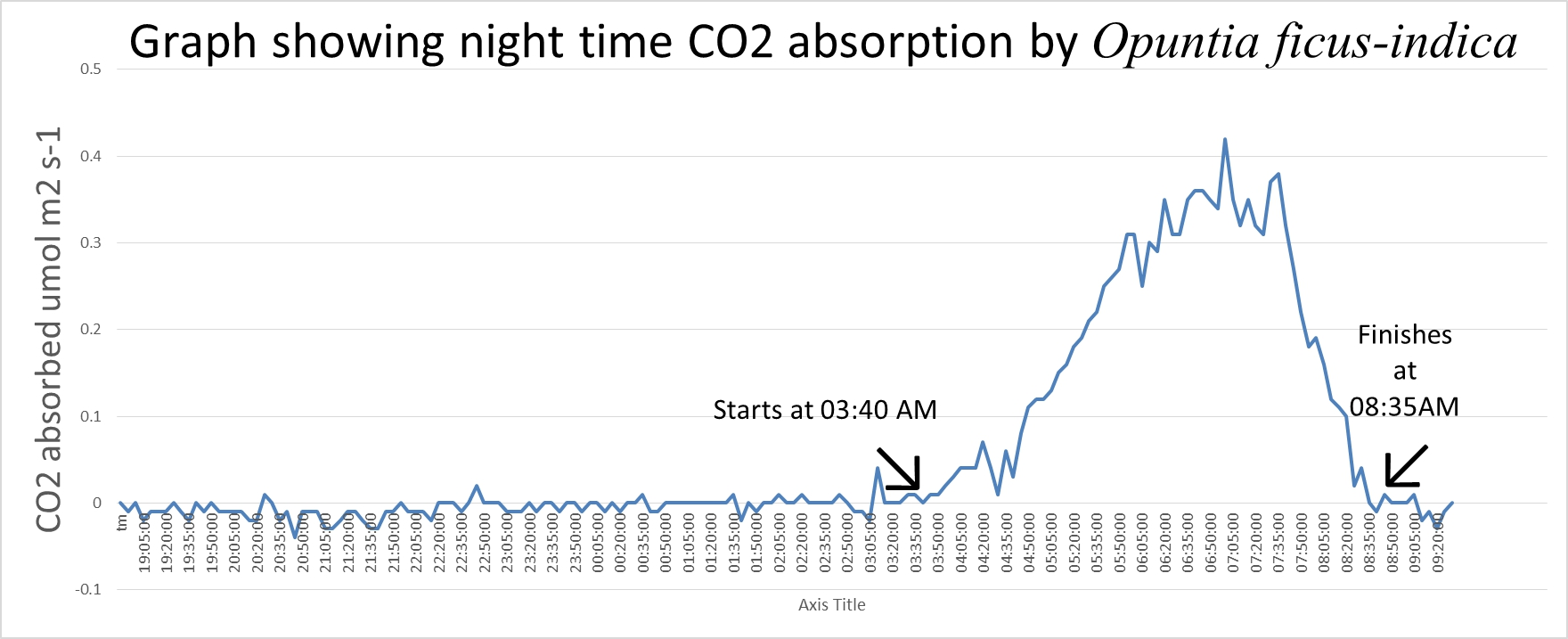
Overnight graph of CO_{2} absorbed by a CAM plant

=== During the day ===
During the day, the stomata close to conserve water, and the CO_{2}-storing organic acids are released from the vacuoles of the mesophyll cells. An enzyme in the stroma of chloroplasts releases the CO_{2}, which enters into the Calvin cycle so that photosynthesis may take place.

=== Benefits ===
The most important benefit of CAM to the plant is the ability to leave most leaf stomata closed during the day. Plants employing CAM are most common in arid environments, where water is scarce. Being able to keep stomata closed during the hottest and driest part of the day reduces the loss of water through evapotranspiration, allowing such plants to grow in environments that would otherwise be far too dry. Plants using only C_{3} carbon fixation, for example, lose 97% of the water they take up through the roots to transpiration - a high cost avoided by plants able to employ CAM.

=== Comparison with C_{4} metabolism ===
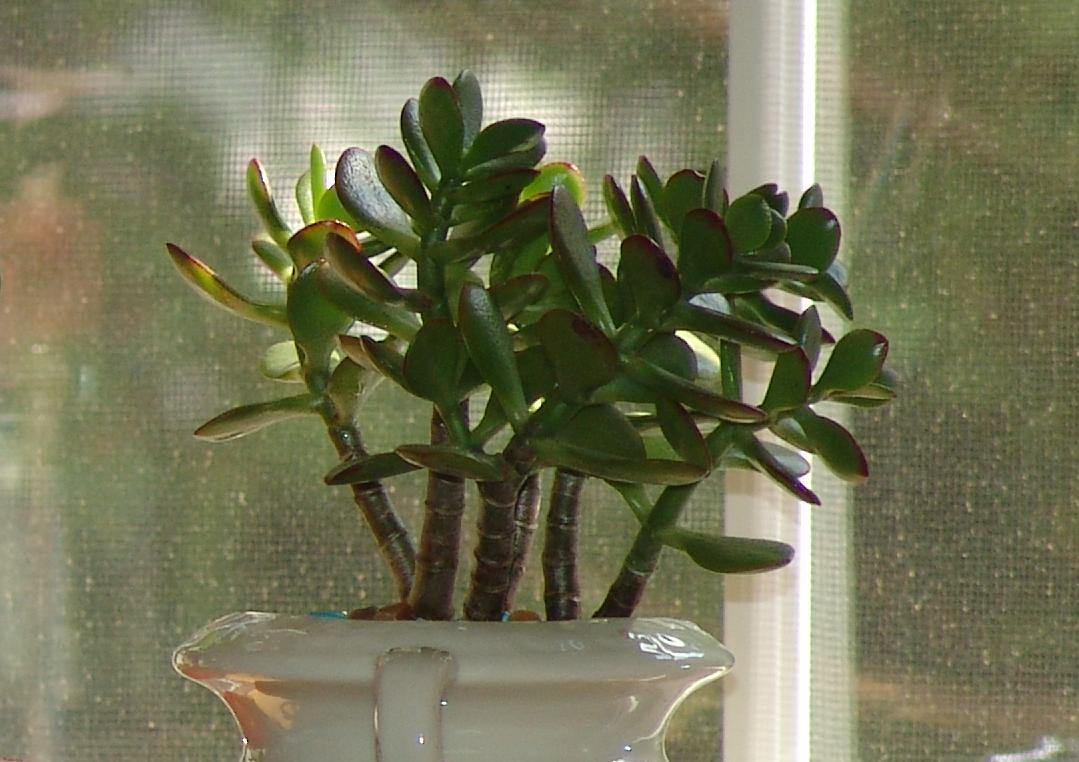
CAM is named after the family Crassulaceae, to which the jade plant belongs.

The C_{4} pathway bears resemblance to CAM; both act to concentrate CO_{2} around RuBisCO, thereby increasing its efficiency. CAM concentrates it temporally, providing CO_{2} during the day, and not at night, when respiration is the dominant reaction. C_{4} plants, in contrast, concentrate CO_{2} spatially, with a RuBisCO reaction centre in a "bundle sheath cell" being inundated with CO_{2}. Due to the inactivity required by the CAM mechanism, C_{4} carbon fixation has a greater efficiency in terms of PGA synthesis.

There are some C_{4}/CAM intermediate species, such as Peperomia camptotricha, Portulaca oleracea, and Portulaca grandiflora. It was previously thought that the two pathways of photosynthesis in such plants could occur in the same leaves but not in the same cells, and that the two pathways could not couple but only occur side by side. It is now known, however, that in at least some species such as Portulaca oleracea, C_{4} and CAM photosynthesis are fully integrated within the same cells, and that CAM-generated metabolites are incorporated directly into the C_{4} cycle.

== Biochemistry ==
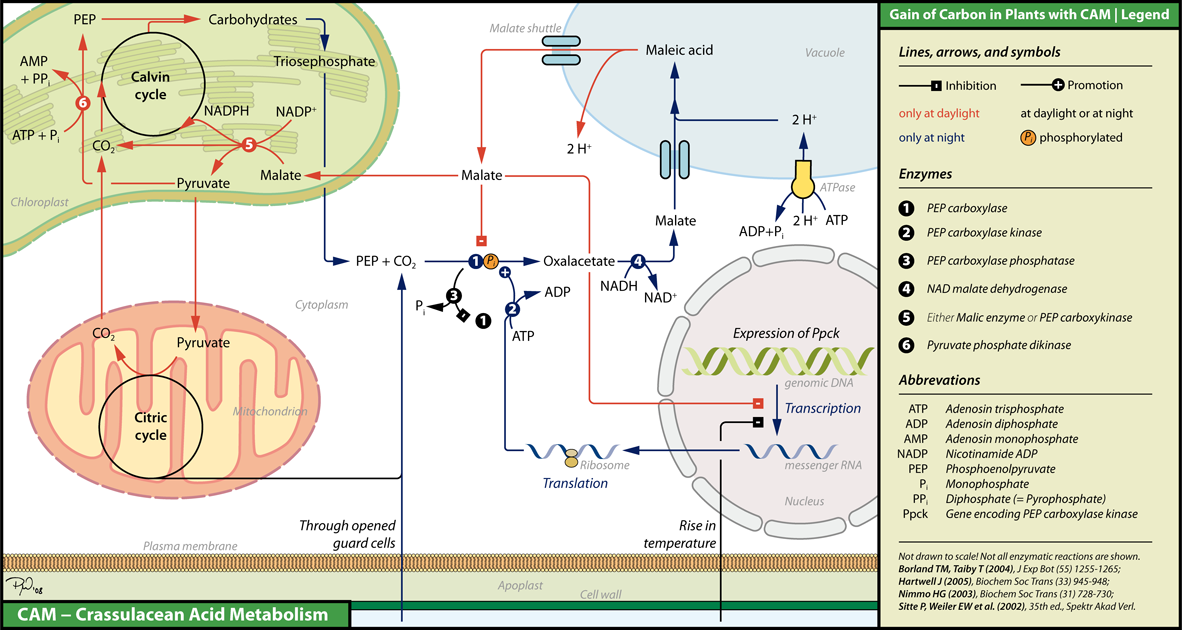
Biochemistry of CAM

Plants with CAM must control storage of CO_{2} and its reduction to branched carbohydrates in space and time.

At low temperatures (frequently at night), plants using CAM open their stomata, CO_{2} molecules diffuse into the spongy mesophyll's intracellular spaces and then into the cytoplasm. Here, they can meet phosphoenolpyruvate (PEP), which is a phosphorylated triose. During this time, the plants are synthesizing a protein called PEP carboxylase kinase (PEP-C kinase), whose expression can be inhibited by high temperatures (frequently at daylight) and the presence of malate. PEP-C kinase phosphorylates its target enzyme PEP carboxylase (PEP-C). Phosphorylation dramatically enhances the enzyme's capability to catalyze the formation of oxaloacetate, which can be subsequently transformed into malate by NAD^{+} malate dehydrogenase. Malate is then transported via malate shuttles into the vacuole, where it is converted into the storage form malic acid. In contrast to PEP-C kinase, PEP-C is synthesized all the time but almost inhibited at daylight either by dephosphorylation via PEP-C phosphatase or directly by binding malate. The latter is not possible at low temperatures, since malate is efficiently transported into the vacuole, whereas PEP-C kinase readily inverts dephosphorylation.

In daylight, plants using CAM close their guard cells and discharge malate that is subsequently transported into chloroplasts. There, depending on plant species, it is cleaved into pyruvate and CO_{2} either by malic enzyme or by PEP carboxykinase. CO_{2} is then introduced into the Calvin cycle, a coupled and self-recovering enzyme system, which is used to build branched carbohydrates. The by-product pyruvate can be further degraded in the mitochondrial citric acid cycle, thereby providing additional CO_{2} molecules for the Calvin Cycle. Pyruvate can also be used to recover PEP via pyruvate phosphate dikinase, a high-energy step, which requires ATP and an additional phosphate. During the following cool night, PEP is finally exported into the cytoplasm, where it is involved in fixing carbon dioxide via malate.

== Use by plants ==
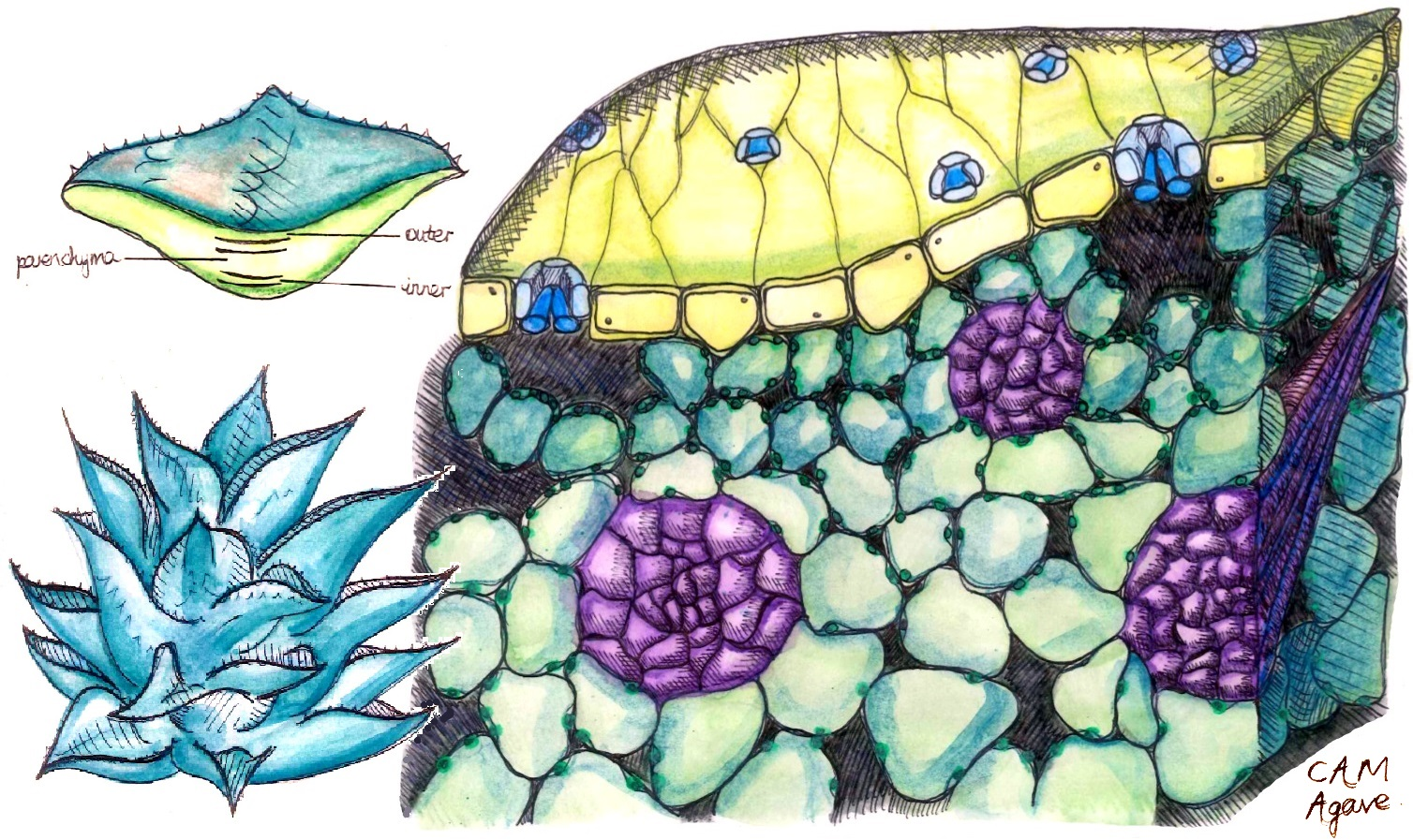
Cross section of a CAM (Crassulacean acid metabolism) plant, specifically of an agave leaf. Vascular bundles shown. Drawing based on microscopic images courtesy of Cambridge University Plant Sciences Department.

Plants use CAM to different degrees. Some are "obligate CAM plants", i.e. they use only CAM in photosynthesis, although they vary in the amount of CO_{2} they are able to store as organic acids; they are sometimes divided into "strong CAM" and "weak CAM" plants on this basis. Other plants show "inducible CAM", in which they are able to switch between using either the C_{3} or C_{4} mechanism and CAM depending on environmental conditions. Another group of plants employ "CAM-cycling", in which their stomata do not open at night; the plants instead recycle CO_{2} produced by respiration as well as storing some CO_{2} during the day.

Plants showing inducible CAM and CAM-cycling are typically found in conditions where periods of water shortage alternate with periods when water is freely available. Periodic drought – a feature of semi-arid regions – is one cause of water shortage. Plants which grow on trees or rocks (as epiphytes or lithophytes) also experience variations in water availability. Salinity, high light levels and nutrient availability are other factors which have been shown to induce CAM.

Since CAM is an adaptation to arid conditions, plants using CAM often display other xerophytic characters, such as thick, reduced leaves with a low surface-area-to-volume ratio; thick cuticle; and stomata sunken into pits. Some shed their leaves during the dry season; others (the succulents) store water in vacuoles. CAM also causes taste differences: plants may have an increasingly sour taste during the night yet become sweeter-tasting during the day. This is due to malic acid being stored in the vacuoles of the plants' cells during the night and then being used up during the day.

== Aquatic CAM ==
CAM photosynthesis is also found in aquatic species in at least 4 genera, including: Isoetes, Crassula, Littorella, Sagittaria, and possibly Vallisneria, being found in a variety of species e.g. Isoetes howellii, Crassula aquatica.

These plants follow the same nocturnal acid accumulation and daytime deacidification as terrestrial CAM species. However, the reason for CAM in aquatic plants is not due to a lack of available water, but a limited supply of CO_{2}. CO_{2} is limited due to slow diffusion in water, 10000x slower than in air. The problem is especially acute under acid pH, where the only inorganic carbon species present is CO_{2}, with no available bicarbonate or carbonate supply.

Aquatic CAM plants capture carbon at night when it is abundant due to a lack of competition from other photosynthetic organisms. This also results in lowered photorespiration due to less photosynthetically generated oxygen.

Aquatic CAM is most marked in the summer months when there is increased competition for CO_{2}, compared to the winter months. However, in the winter months CAM still has a significant role.

== Ecological and taxonomic distribution of CAM-using plants ==
CAM has evolved convergently many times across vascular plants and does not represent a single evolutionary lineage. Comparative studies indicate that CAM evolution generally involves modifications to existing photosynthetic pathways rather than the evolution of entirely new enzymes, with many of the enzymes required for CAM already present in C_{3} plants. Repeated origins of CAM are commonly associated with changes in when and where these enzymes are expressed, including shifts in daily circadian patterns of gene activity and differences in expression between tissues. Genomic studies in some CAM lineages show that expansion of gene families involved in carbon fixation and organic acid metabolism can accompany the evolution of CAM, suggesting that gene duplication may facilitate repeated evolutionary transitions to this pathway. The evolution of CAM is also strongly associated with plant lineages that possess traits such as succulence and large vacuoles, which enable the storage of organic acids produced during nocturnal carbon fixation.

The majority of plants possessing CAM are either epiphytes (e.g., orchids, bromeliads) or succulent xerophytes (e.g., cacti, cactoid Euphorbias), but CAM is also found in hemiepiphytes (e.g., Clusia); lithophytes (e.g., Sedum, Sempervivum); terrestrial bromeliads; wetland plants (e.g., Isoetes, Crassula (Tillaea), Lobelia); and in one halophyte, Mesembryanthemum crystallinum; one non-succulent terrestrial plant, (Dodonaea viscosa) and one mangrove associate (Sesuvium portulacastrum).

The only trees that can do CAM are in the genus Clusia; species of which are found across Central America, South America and the Caribbean. In Clusia, CAM is found in species that inhabit hotter, drier ecological niches, whereas species living in cooler montane forests tend to be C_{3}. In addition, some species of Clusia can temporarily switch their photosynthetic physiology from C_{3} to CAM, a process known as facultative CAM. This allows these trees to benefit from the elevated growth rates of C_{3} photosynthesis, when water is plentiful, and the drought tolerant nature of CAM, when the dry season occurs.

Plants which are able to switch between different methods of carbon fixation include Portulacaria afra, better known as Dwarf Jade Plant, which normally uses C_{3} fixation but can use CAM if it is drought-stressed, and Portulaca oleracea, better known as Purslane, which normally uses C_{4} fixation but is also able to switch to CAM when drought-stressed.

CAM occurs in approximately 16,000 species across more than 300 genera and around 40 families, although this number is likely an underestimate due to the presence of weak or facultative CAM in many species. Most CAM plants are flowering plants, but CAM has also evolved independently in some ferns, Gnetopsida, and quillworts, including Isoetes taiwanensis, whose genome provides evidence for an independent origin of CAM outside angiosperms.

The following list summarizes the taxonomic distribution of plants with CAM:

Division	Class/Angiosperm group	Order	Family	Plant Type	Clade involved
Lycopodiophyta	Isoetopsida	Isoetales	Isoetaceae	hydrophyte	Isoetes (the sole genus of class Isoetopsida) - I. howellii (seasonally submerged), I. macrospora, I. bolanderi, I. engelmannii, I. lacustris, I. sinensis, I. storkii, I. kirkii, I. taiwanensis.
Pteridophyta	Polypodiopsida	Polypodiales	Polypodiaceae	epiphyte, lithophyte	CAM is recorded from Microsorum, Platycerium and Polypodium, Pyrrosia and Drymoglossum and Microgramma
	Pteridopsida	Polypodiales	Pteridaceae	epiphyte	Vittaria Anetium citrifolium
Cycadophyta	Cycadopsida	Cycadales	Zamiaceae		Dioon edule
Gnetophyta	Gnetopsida	Welwitschiales	Welwitschiaceae	xerophyte	Welwitschia mirabilis (the sole species of the order Welwitschiales), other studies show probable C3 metabolism in Welwitschia
Magnoliophyta	magnoliids	Magnoliales	Piperaceae	epiphyte	Peperomia camptotricha
Magnoliophyta	eudicots	Caryophyllales	Aizoaceae	xerophyte	widespread in the family; Mesembryanthemum crystallinum is a rare instance of an halophyte that displays CAM
Magnoliophyta	eudicots	Caryophyllales	Cactaceae	xerophyte	Almost all cacti have obligate Crassulacean Acid Metabolism in their stems; the few cacti with leaves may have C_{3} Metabolism in those leaves; seedlings have C_{3} Metabolism.
Magnoliophyta	eudicots	Caryophyllales	Portulacaceae	xerophyte	recorded in approximately half of the genera (note: Portulacaceae is paraphyletic with respect to Cactaceae and Didiereaceae)
Magnoliophyta	eudicots	Caryophyllales	Didiereaceae	xerophyte	
Magnoliophyta	eudicots	Saxifragales	Crassulaceae	hydrophyte, xerophyte, lithophyte	Crassulacean acid metabolism is widespread among the (eponymous) Crassulaceae.
Magnoliophyta	eudicots (rosids)	Vitales	Vitaceae		Cissus, Cyphostemma
Magnoliophyta	eudicots (rosids)	Malpighiales	Clusiaceae	hemiepiphyte	Clusia
Magnoliophyta	eudicots (rosids)	Malpighiales	Euphorbiaceae		CAM is found is some species of Euphorbia including some formerly placed in the sunk genera Monadenium, Pedilanthus and Synadenium. C4 photosynthesis is also found in Euphorbia (subgenus Chamaesyce).
Magnoliophyta	eudicots (rosids)	Malpighiales	Passifloraceae	xerophyte	Adenia
Magnoliophyta	eudicots (rosids)	Geraniales	Geraniaceae		CAM is found in some succulent species of Pelargonium, and is also reported from Geranium pratense
Magnoliophyta	eudicots (rosids)	Cucurbitales	Cucurbitaceae		Xerosicyos danguyi, Dendrosicyos socotrana, Momordica
Magnoliophyta	eudicots (rosids)	Celastrales	Celastraceae		
Magnoliophyta	eudicots (rosids)	Oxalidales	Oxalidaceae		Oxalis mollendoensis (Synonym: Oxalis carnosa var. hirta)
Magnoliophyta	eudicots (rosids)	Brassicales	Moringaceae		Moringa
Magnoliophyta	eudicots (rosids)	Brassicales	Salvadoraceae		CAM is found in Salvadora persica. Salvadoraceae were previously placed in order Celastrales, but are now placed in Brassicales.
Magnoliophyta	eudicots (rosids)	Sapindales	Sapindaceae		Dodonaea viscosa
Magnoliophyta	eudicots (rosids)	Fabales	Fabaceae		CAM is found in Prosopis juliflora (listed under the family Salvadoraceae in Sayed's (2001) table,) but is currently in the family Fabaceae (Leguminosae) according to The Plant List).
Magnoliophyta	eudicots (rosids)		Zygophyllaceae		Zygophyllum
Magnoliophyta	eudicots (asterids)	Ericales	Ebenaceae		
Magnoliophyta	eudicots (asterids)	Solanales	Convolvulaceae		Ipomoea (Some species of Ipomoea are C3 - a citation is needed here.)
Magnoliophyta	eudicots (asterids)	Gentianales	Rubiaceae	epiphyte	Hydnophytum and Myrmecodia
Magnoliophyta	eudicots (asterids)	Gentianales	Apocynaceae		CAM is found in subfamily Asclepidioideae (Hoya, Dischidia, Ceropegia, Stapelia, Caralluma negevensis, Frerea indica, Adenium, Huernia), and also in Carissa and Acokanthera
Magnoliophyta	eudicots (asterids)	Lamiales	Gesneriaceae	epiphyte	CAM was found Codonanthe crassifolia, but not in 3 other genera
Magnoliophyta	eudicots (asterids)	Lamiales	Lamiaceae		Plectranthus marrubioides, Coleus
Magnoliophyta	eudicots (asterids)	Lamiales	Plantaginaceae	hydrophyte	Littorella uniflora
Magnoliophyta	eudicots (asterids)	Apiales	Apiaceae	hydrophyte	Lilaeopsis lacustris
Magnoliophyta	eudicots (asterids)	Asterales	Asteraceae		some species of Senecio
Magnoliophyta	monocots	Alismatales	Hydrocharitaceae	hydrophyte	Hydrilla, Vallisneria
Magnoliophyta	monocots	Alismatales	Alismataceae	hydrophyte	Sagittaria
Magnoliophyta	monocots	Alismatales	Araceae		Zamioculcas zamiifolia is the only CAM plant in Araceae, and the only non-aquatic CAM plant in Alismatales
Magnoliophyta	monocots	Poales	Bromeliaceae	epiphyte	Bromelioideae (91%), Puya (24%), Dyckia and related genera (all), Hechtia (all), Tillandsia (many)
Magnoliophyta	monocots	Poales	Cyperaceae	hydrophyte	Scirpus, Eleocharis
Magnoliophyta	monocots	Asparagales	Orchidaceae	epiphyte	Orchidaceae has more CAM species than any other family (CAM Orchids)
Magnoliophyta	monocots	Asparagales	Agavaceae	xerophyte	Agave, Hesperaloe, Yucca and Polianthes
Magnoliophyta	monocots	Asparagales	Asphodelaceae	xerophyte	Aloe, Gasteria, and Haworthia
Magnoliophyta	monocots	Asparagales	Ruscaceae		Sansevieria (This genus is listed under the family Dracaenaceae in Sayed's (2001) table, but currently in the family Asparagaceae according to The Plant List), Dracaena
Magnoliophyta	monocots	Commelinales	Commelinaceae		Callisia, Tradescantia, Tripogandra

== See also ==
- C2 photosynthesis
- C3 carbon fixation
- C4 carbon fixation
- RuBisCO
