= Cyclophorus =

Cyclophorus may be:

- Cyclophorus (gastropod), a genus of tropical land snails
- Cyclophorus (plant), a genus of ferns
