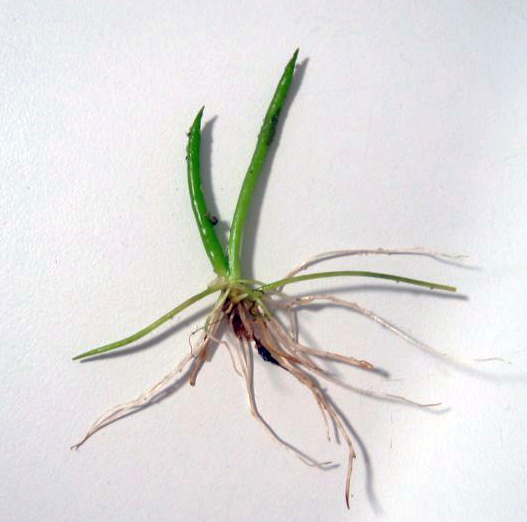

Scientific classification
- Kingdom: Plantae
- Clade: Embryophytes
- Clade: Tracheophytes
- Clade: Angiosperms
- Clade: Eudicots
- Clade: Asterids
- Order: Lamiales
- Family: Plantaginaceae
- Genus: Littorella
- Species: L. uniflora

Binomial name
- Littorella uniflora (L.) Asch.

Synonyms
- Littorella juncea P.J.Bergius; Littorella lacustris L.; Plantago uniflora L.

= Littorella uniflora =

Species of flowering plant

Littorella uniflora (vernacular name: (American) shoreweed) is a species of aquatic flowering plant native to the Azores, Morocco, most of Europe excluding the dry southeast, Iceland, and the Faroes. It prefers to live mostly submerged in nutrient-poor freshwater habitats. When submerged, it draws CO_{2} mostly through its roots and uses a mix of crassulacean acid metabolism (CAM) and C_{3} carbon fixation for photosynthesis. If the water level drops and exposes the roots, it ceases using CAM.
