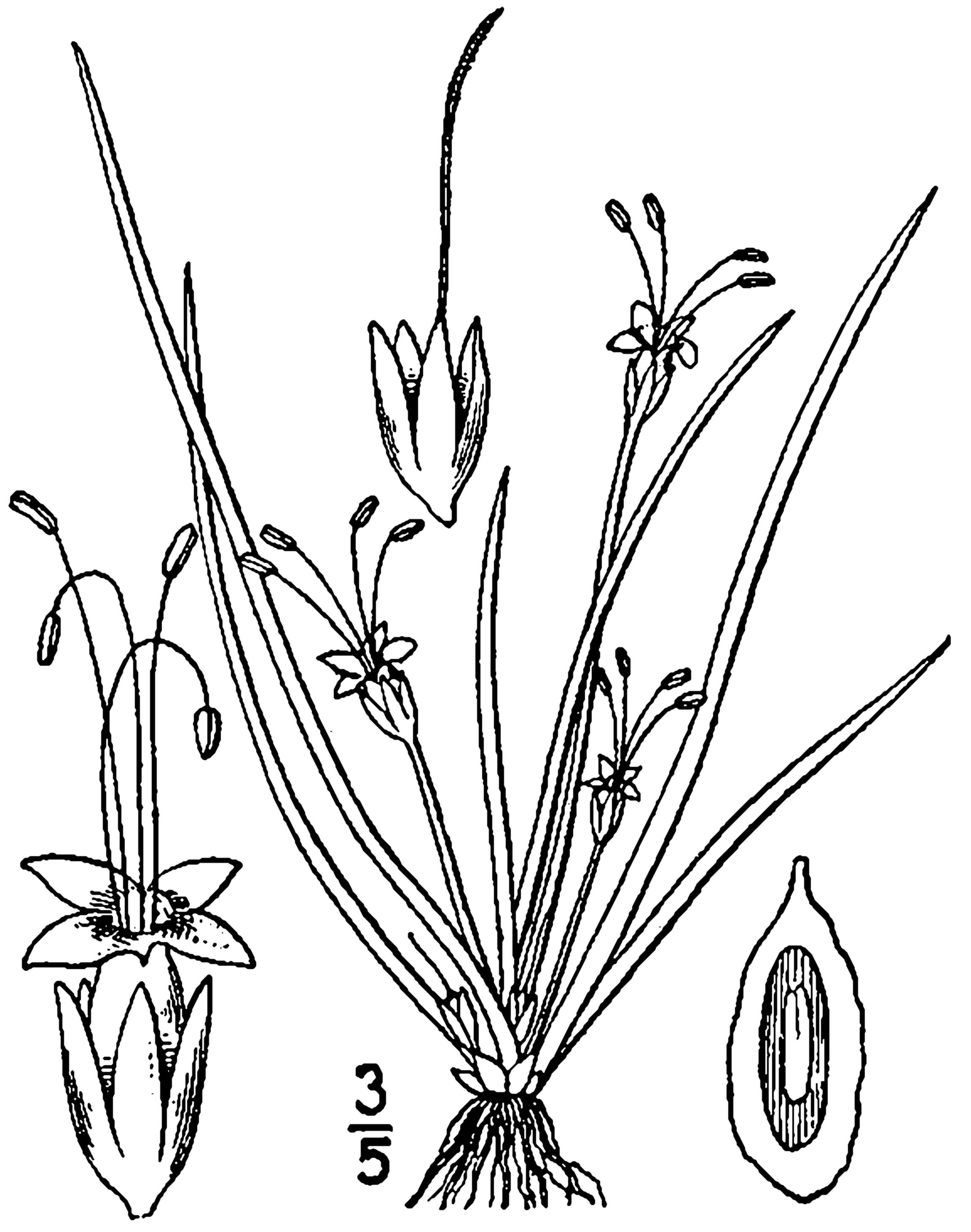
- Littorella americana line drawing

Scientific classification
- Kingdom: Plantae
- Clade: Embryophytes
- Clade: Tracheophytes
- Clade: Angiosperms
- Clade: Eudicots
- Clade: Asterids
- Order: Lamiales
- Family: Plantaginaceae
- Genus: Littorella
- Species: L. americana

Binomial name
- Littorella americana Fernald

Synonyms
- Littorella flexuosa Raf.; Littorella uniflora var. americana (Fernald) Gleason; Plantago americana (Fernald) Rahn

= Littorella americana =

Species of flowering plant

Littorella americana Is a species of flowering plant commonly called American shore plantain. It is a small aquatic plant native to Newfoundland and Nova Scotia to Minnesota.

== Description ==
Littorella americana Is a monoecious (having separate male and female flowers on the same plant) perennial growing from thin annual stolons and rhizomes. The leaves are stiff with an arching habit, they are rounded in cross section. The flowers are wind pollinated (anemophilous). Plants have a single, staminate flower, produced on top of a bare pedicel (stems that hold flowers) up to 4.0 cm (1.6 in.) long. The staminate flower has four sepals and four anthers which have long thin filaments. The sessile, pistillate flowers are produced around the base of the plant, they have long stigmatic styles. Flowering occurs when the plants are exposed by low water levels.The unilocular ovaries produce small nuts, but clonal plants rarely produce fruits, apparently being self incompatible.

== Habitat ==
Littorella americana grows in shallow water along the margins of oligotrophic lakes with sandy or gravelly bottoms. It can form dense mats by way of spreading rhizomes. Water depths of 20 to 60 cm (7.9 to 24 in) are preferred but it is also found above the water line on sandy beaches. It is found growing in clear and dark watered lakes and in permanent ponds.

== Native range ==
Littorella americana is native to the US states of Maine, Michigan, Minnesota, New Hampshire, New York, Vermont, and Wisconsin; it is also found in the Canadian provinces of Newfoundland, Nova Scotia, Ontario, Québec, and New Brunswick.
