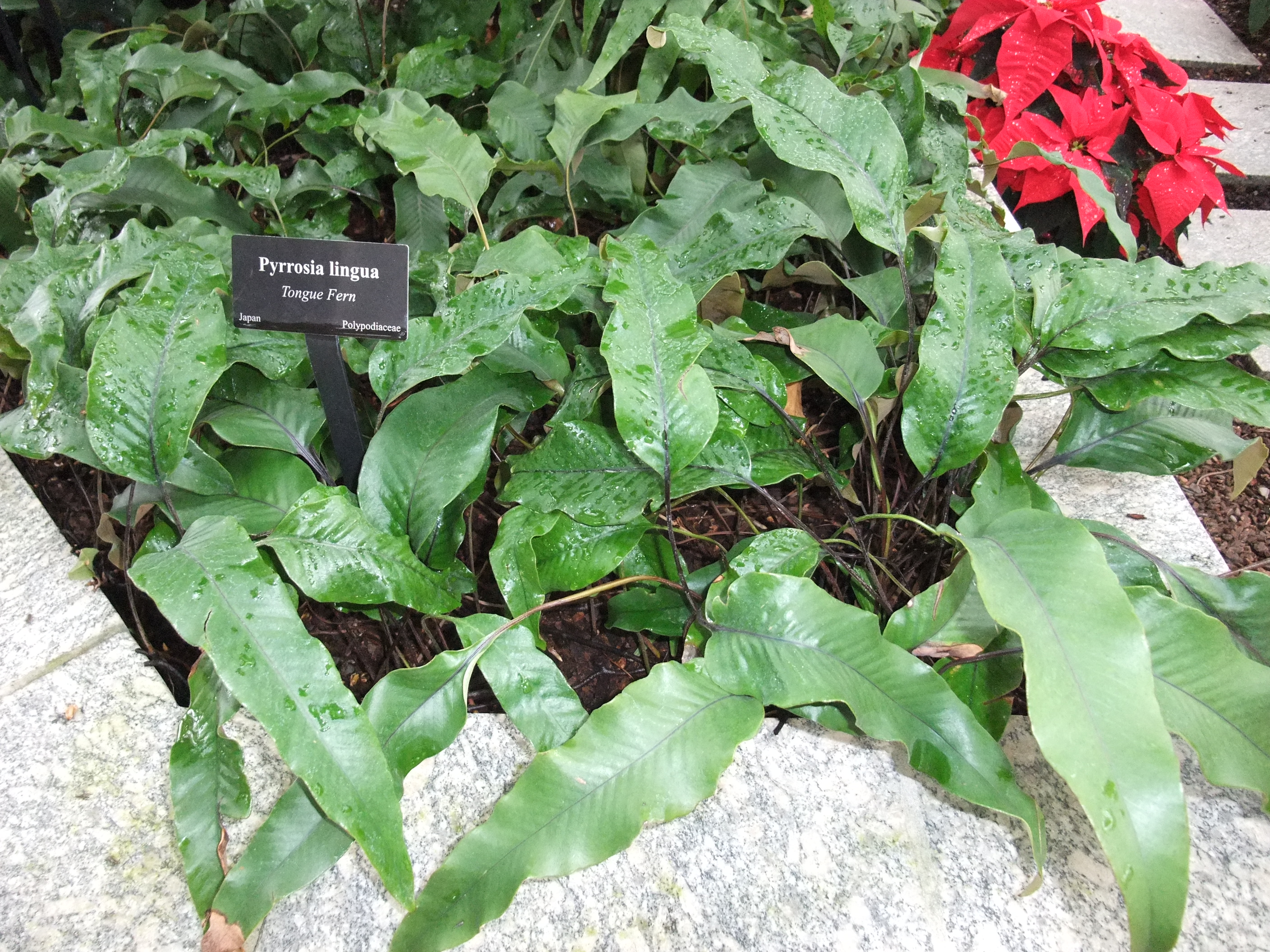

Scientific classification
- Kingdom: Plantae
- Clade: Tracheophytes
- Division: Polypodiophyta
- Class: Polypodiopsida
- Order: Polypodiales
- Suborder: Polypodiineae
- Family: Polypodiaceae
- Genus: Pyrrosia
- Species: P. lingua

Binomial name
- Pyrrosia lingua (Thunb.) Farw.

= Pyrrosia lingua =

Species of fern

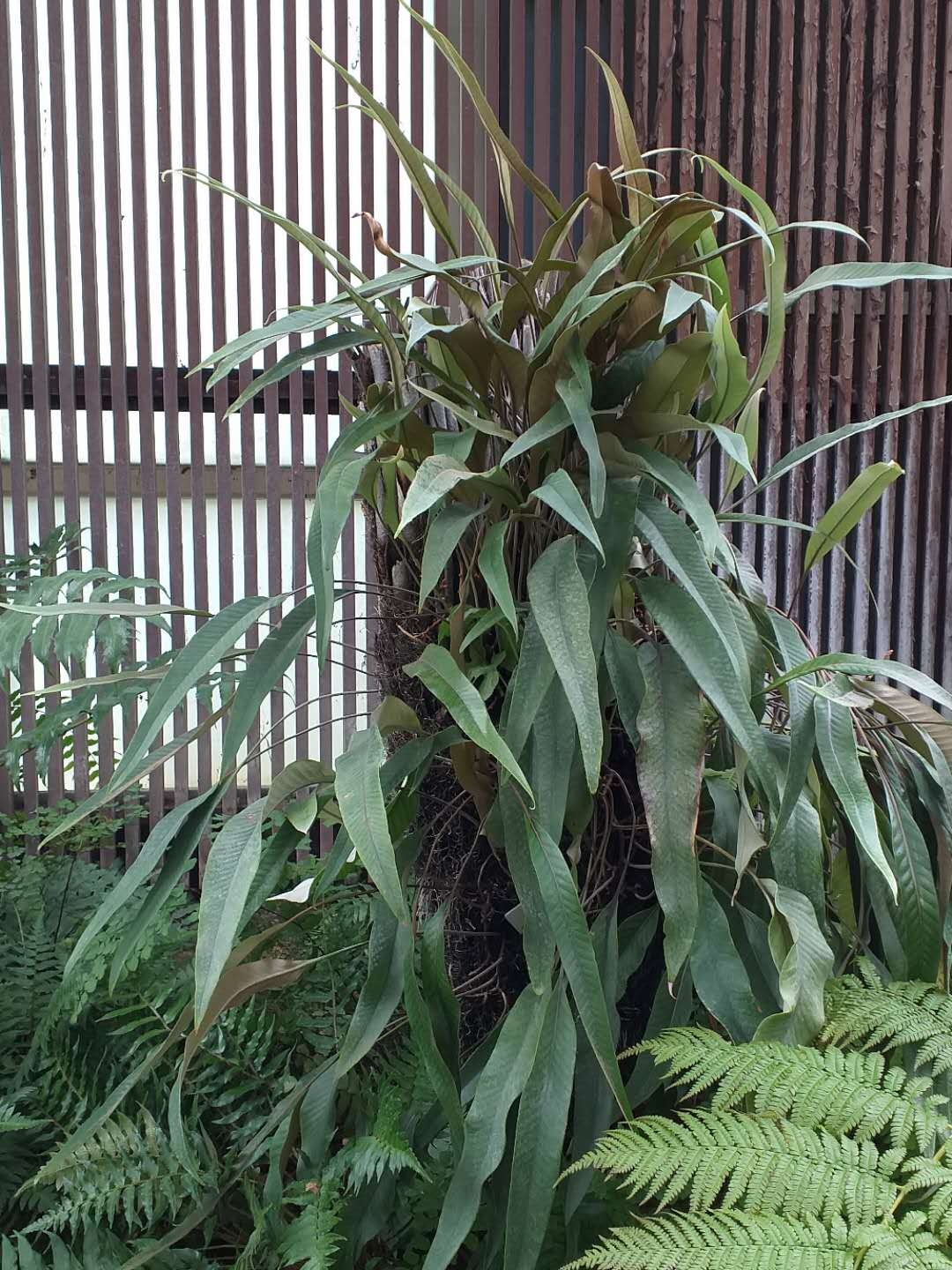
Pyrrosia lingua

Pyrrosia lingua is a species of epiphytic fern in the family Polypodiaceae. It occurs through China and Southeast Asia and into Japan and Taiwan. Pyrrosia lingua is grown as a cultivated plant, and multiple named cultivars have been developed.
