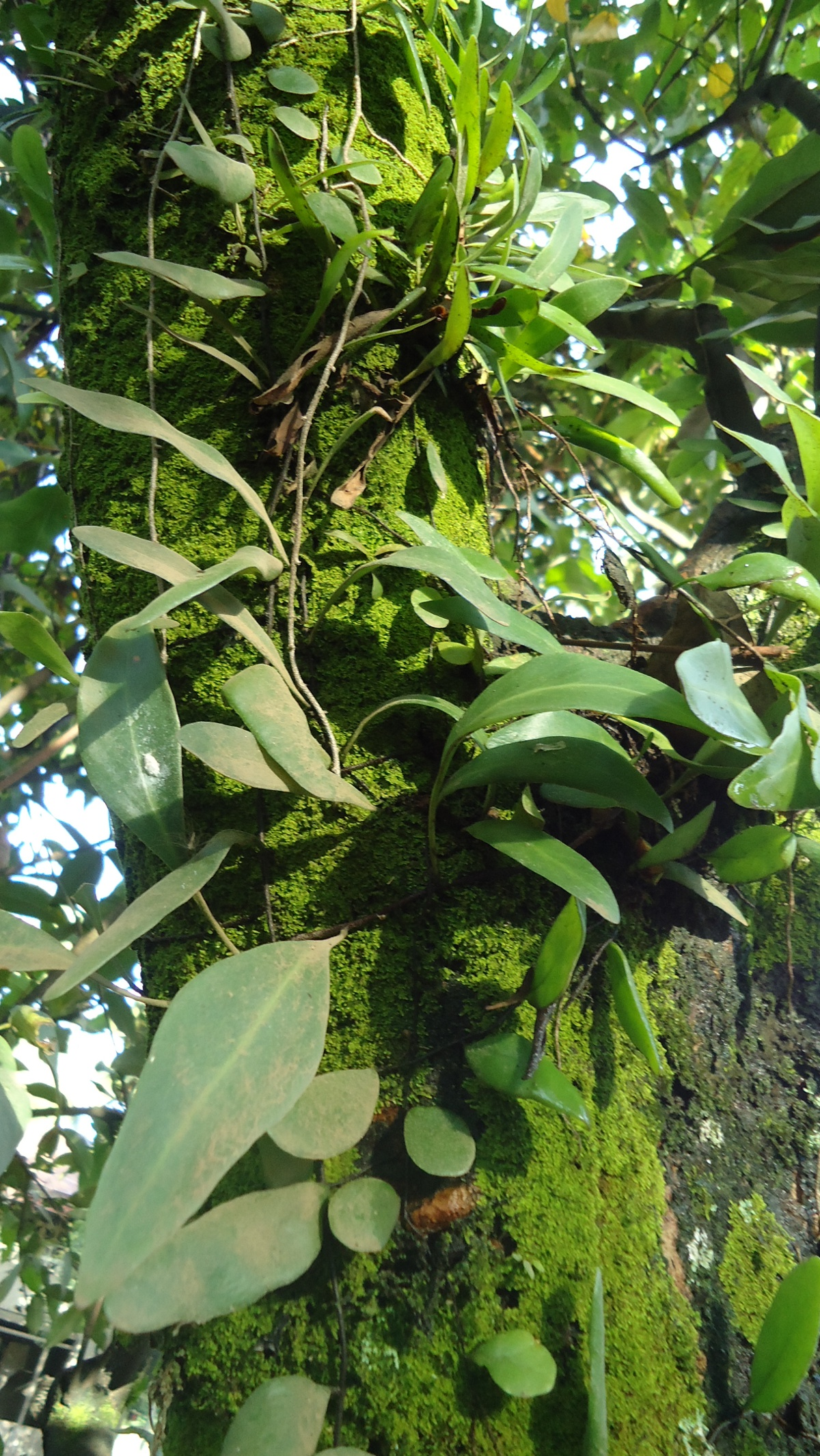

Scientific classification
- Kingdom: Plantae
- Clade: Tracheophytes
- Division: Polypodiophyta
- Class: Polypodiopsida
- Order: Polypodiales
- Suborder: Polypodiineae
- Family: Polypodiaceae
- Genus: Pyrrosia
- Species: P. piloselloides

Binomial name
- Pyrrosia piloselloides (L.) M.G.Price

= Pyrrosia piloselloides =

Species of fern

Pyrrosia piloselloides, also known as the Dragon-scale fern, is a fern first published in 1974. Native to a wide range from Southwest India to Japan and Papuasia, it is an epiphytic fern that primarily grows in wet tropical biomes. The species is characterized by its dimorphic fronds and rhizomes covered in scales. It has distinct star-like hairs that cover its fronds.
