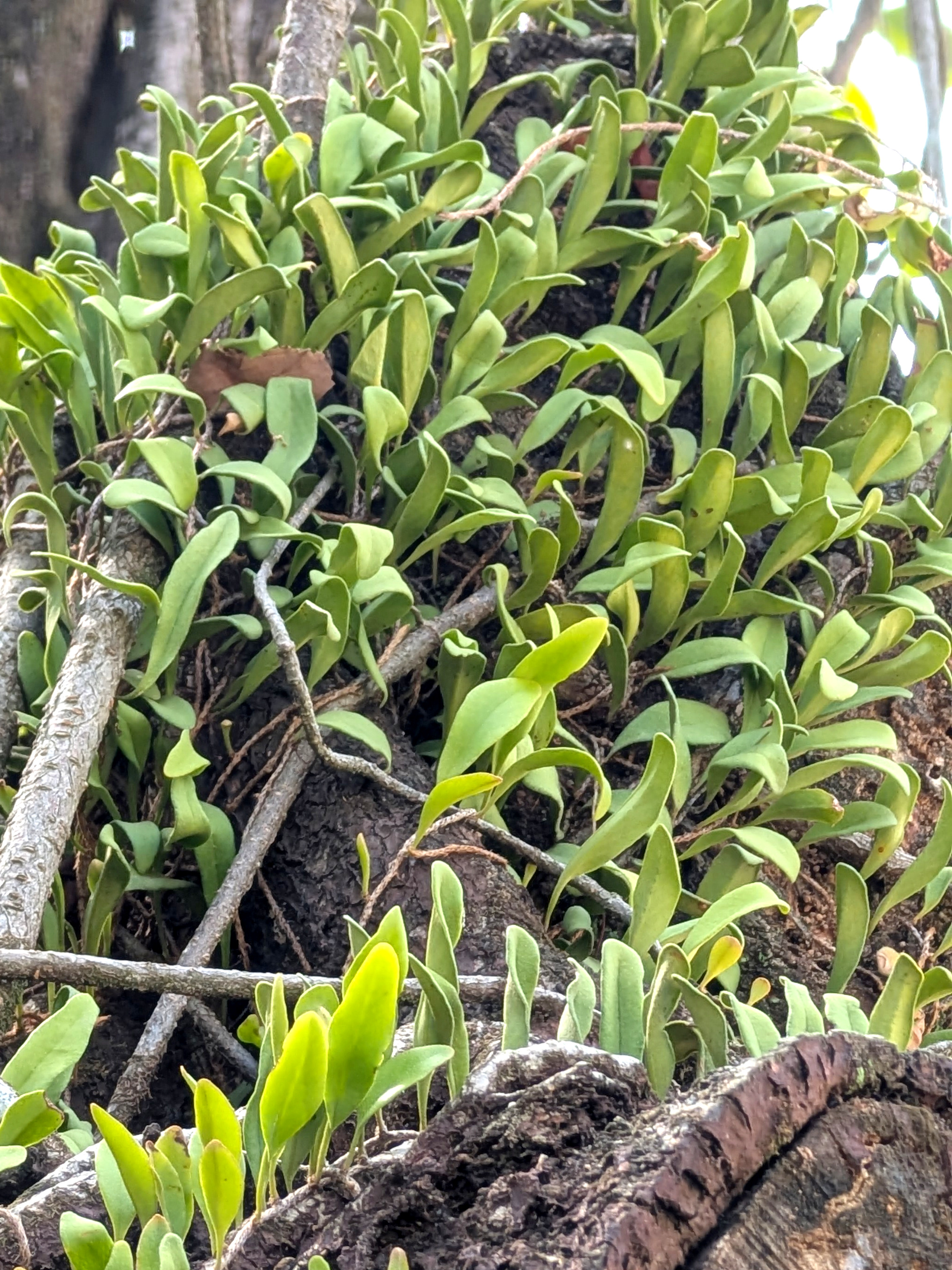
- Shenzhen, China

Scientific classification
- Kingdom: Plantae
- Clade: Embryophytes
- Clade: Tracheophytes
- Division: Polypodiophyta
- Class: Polypodiopsida
- Order: Polypodiales
- Suborder: Polypodiineae
- Family: Polypodiaceae
- Genus: Pyrrosia
- Species: P. adnascens

Binomial name
- Pyrrosia adnascens (Sw.) Ching

Synonyms
- Cyclophorus adnascens (Sw.) Desv.; Niphobolus adnascens (Sw.) Kaulf.; Polypodium adnascens Sw.

= Pyrrosia adnascens =

Species of fern

Pyrrosia adnascens, the tongue fern, is a common fern occurring in many parts of Asia. Such as Bangladesh, China, the Philippines and Vietnam. Found as an epiphyte or lithophyte in areas of part shade and high moisture.
