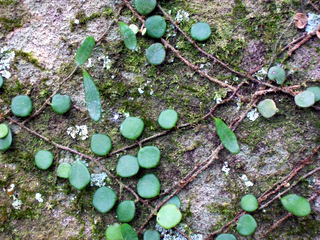
- Rock felt fern at Chatswood West growing on Hawkesbury sandstone

Scientific classification
- Kingdom: Plantae
- Clade: Tracheophytes
- Division: Polypodiophyta
- Class: Polypodiopsida
- Order: Polypodiales
- Suborder: Polypodiineae
- Family: Polypodiaceae
- Genus: Pyrrosia
- Species: P. rupestris

Binomial name
- Pyrrosia rupestris (R.Br.) Ching

= Pyrrosia rupestris =

Rock felt fern

Species of fern

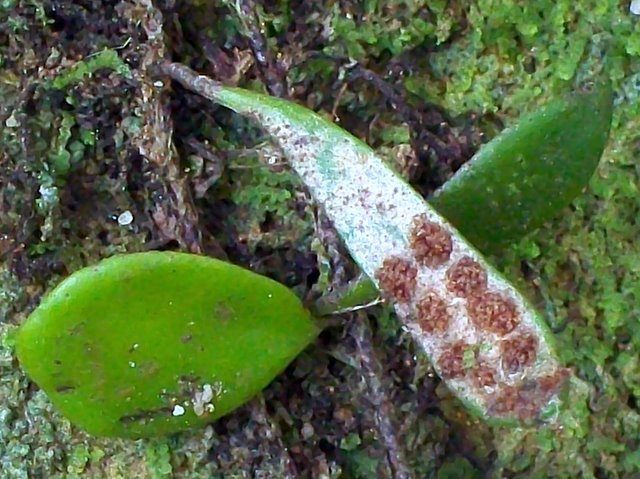
Eight sori on the long mature leaves

Pyrrosia rupestris known as the rock felt fern is a common fern of eastern Australia. Occurring as an epiphyte or lithophyte in areas of part shade and high moisture. Usually found in rainforest or moist eucalyptus forest. Often seen on rainforest trees, quite high above the ground. However, it grows as far west at the more arid Warrumbungle National Park. In drought it shrinks and becomes desiccated. With rain or mist the fern recovers well.

The name Pyrrosia is from the Greek which refers to the flame colour of the hairs that cover the fronds on some species. Rupestris means growing near rocks. Rock felt fern grows from Victoria north through New South Wales and Queensland to New Guinea.

== Description ==
Leaves are round or tongue like in shape. 2 cm round, or up to 10 cm long and 1.5 cm broad. Sterile leaves round, fertile leaves long and tongue shaped. Round dark sori (spores) seen under the long leaves. Rhizomes orange brown in colour, long and creeping. Able to grasp onto rocks or tree trunks.

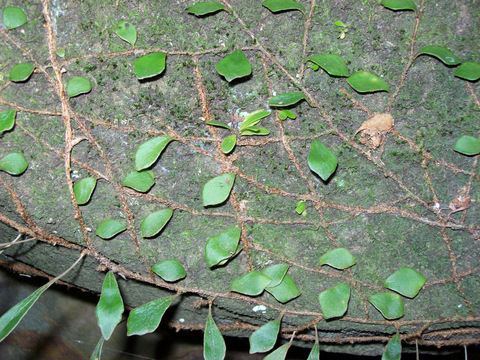
Rock felt fern on Hawkesbury Sandstone, Chatswood West, Australia. Tiny birds nest ferns also growing on the rock
