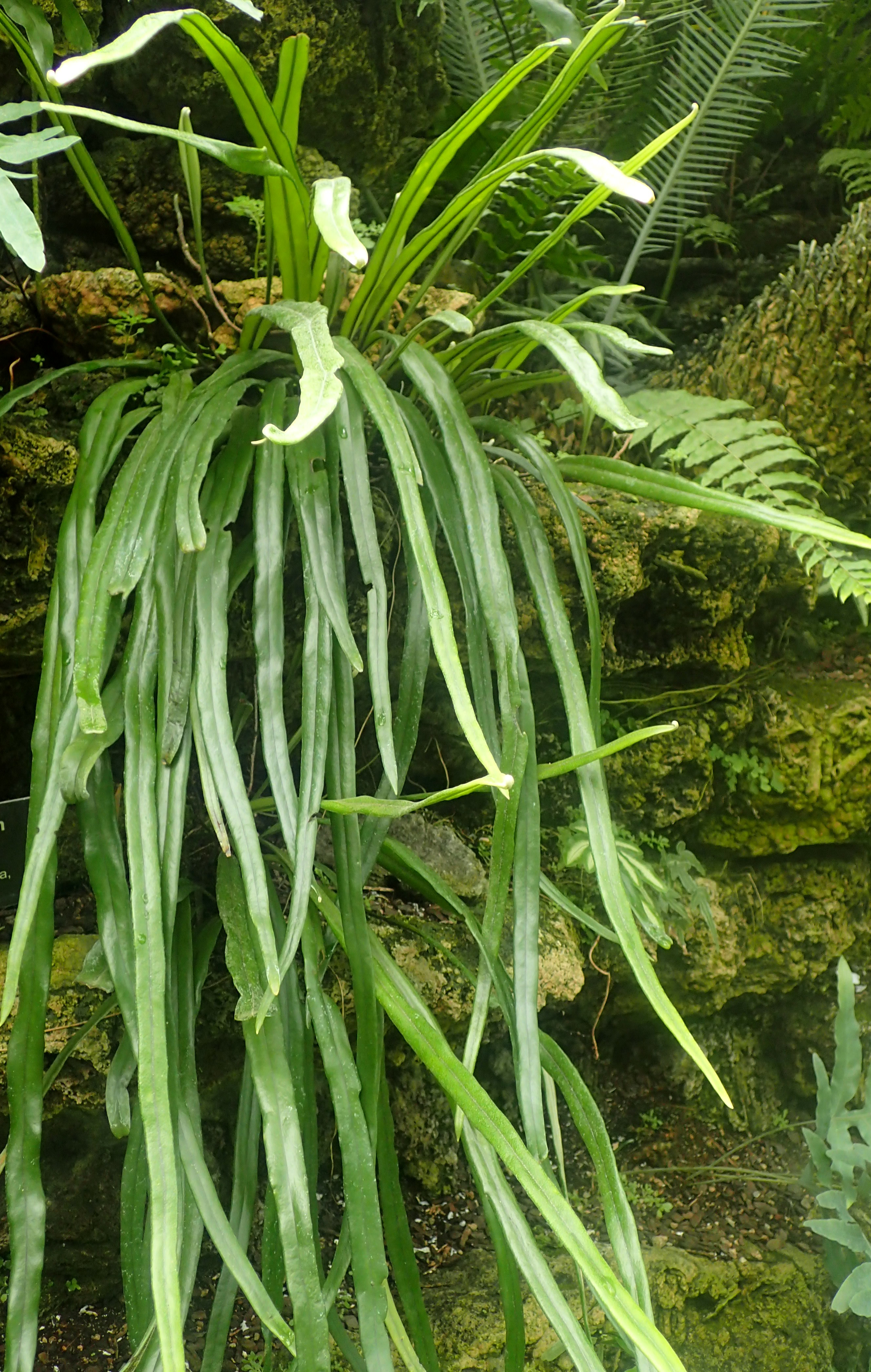

Scientific classification
- Kingdom: Plantae
- Clade: Tracheophytes
- Division: Polypodiophyta
- Class: Polypodiopsida
- Order: Polypodiales
- Suborder: Polypodiineae
- Family: Polypodiaceae
- Genus: Pyrrosia
- Species: P. longifolia

Binomial name
- Pyrrosia longifolia (Burm.f) C.V.Morton

= Pyrrosia longifolia =

Species of fern

Pyrrosia longifolia is a species of fern growing in south east Asia, the Pacific region and Australia.
