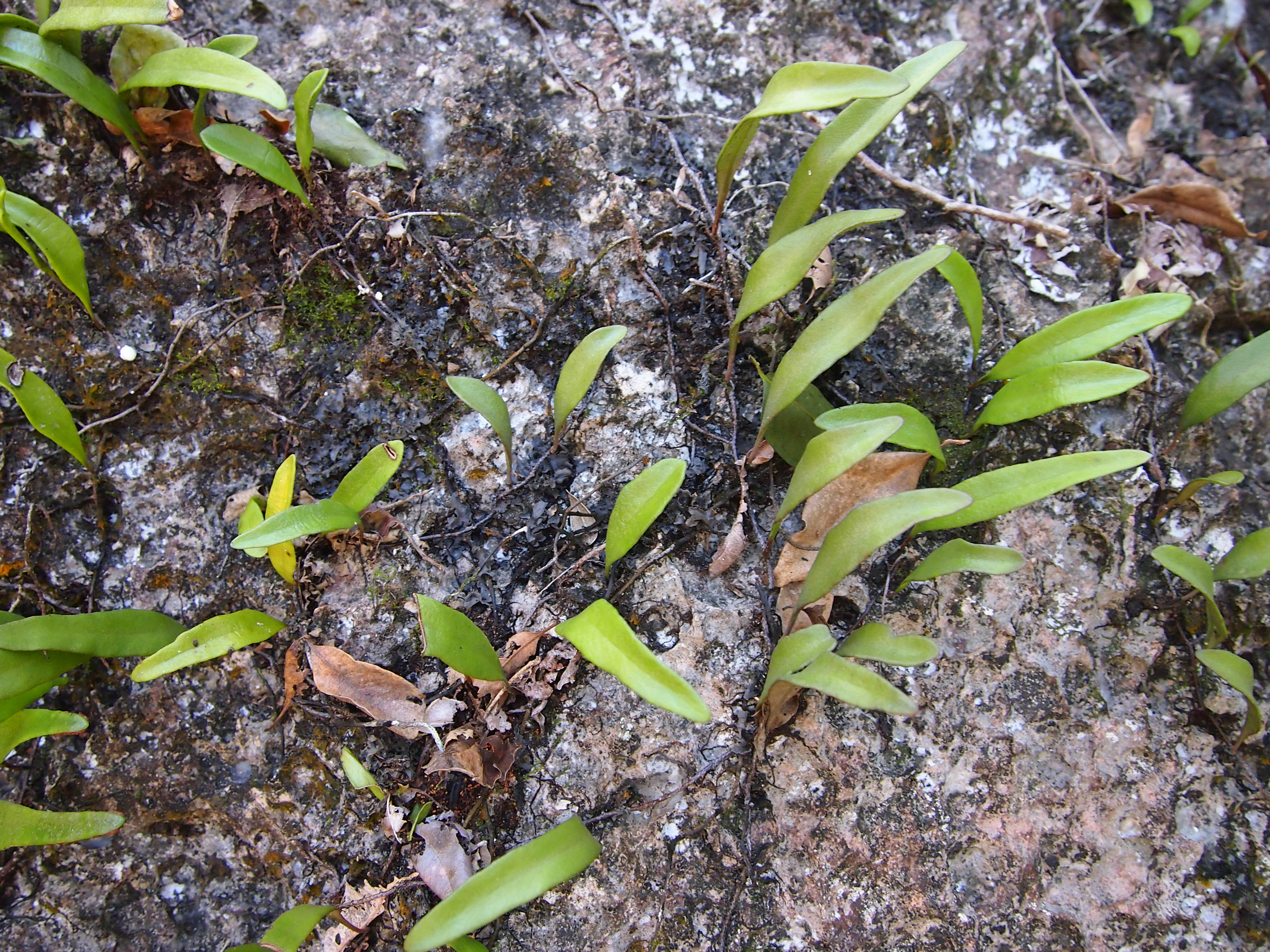
- Mount Etna Caves National Park, Australia

Scientific classification
- Kingdom: Plantae
- Clade: Tracheophytes
- Division: Polypodiophyta
- Class: Polypodiopsida
- Order: Polypodiales
- Suborder: Polypodiineae
- Family: Polypodiaceae
- Genus: Pyrrosia
- Species: P. confluens

Binomial name
- Pyrrosia confluens (R.Br.) Ching

Synonyms
- Polypodium confluens R.Br.

= Pyrrosia confluens =

Species of fern

Pyrrosia confluens known as the horseshoe felt fern or robber fern is a common fern of eastern Australia. Occurring as an epiphyte or lithophyte in areas of part shade and high moisture. Often seen on rocks or creeping up on rainforest trees, quite high above the ground. Found north of the Wyong district. In 1810, the species originally appeared in scientific literature as Polypodium confluens in the Prodromus Florae Novae Hollandiae, authored by the prolific Scottish botanist, Robert Brown.
