= Oxalis mollendoensis =

Scientific classification
- Kingdom: Plantae
- Clade: Embryophytes
- Clade: Tracheophytes
- Clade: Angiosperms
- Clade: Eudicots
- Clade: Rosids
- Order: Oxalidales
- Family: Oxalidaceae
- Genus: Oxalis
- Species: O. mollendoensis

Binomial name
- Oxalis mollendoensis J.M.H.Shaw

Synonyms
- Oxalis bulbocastanum (R.Knuth) Lourteig; Oxalis carnosa var. hirta R.Knuth; Oxalis megalorrhiza var. hirta (R.Knuth) J.F.Macbr

Species of flowering plant native to Peru

Oxalis mollendoensis is a species of geophyte native to Peru. It is one of the only species of Oxalidales capable of CAM photosynthesis.
