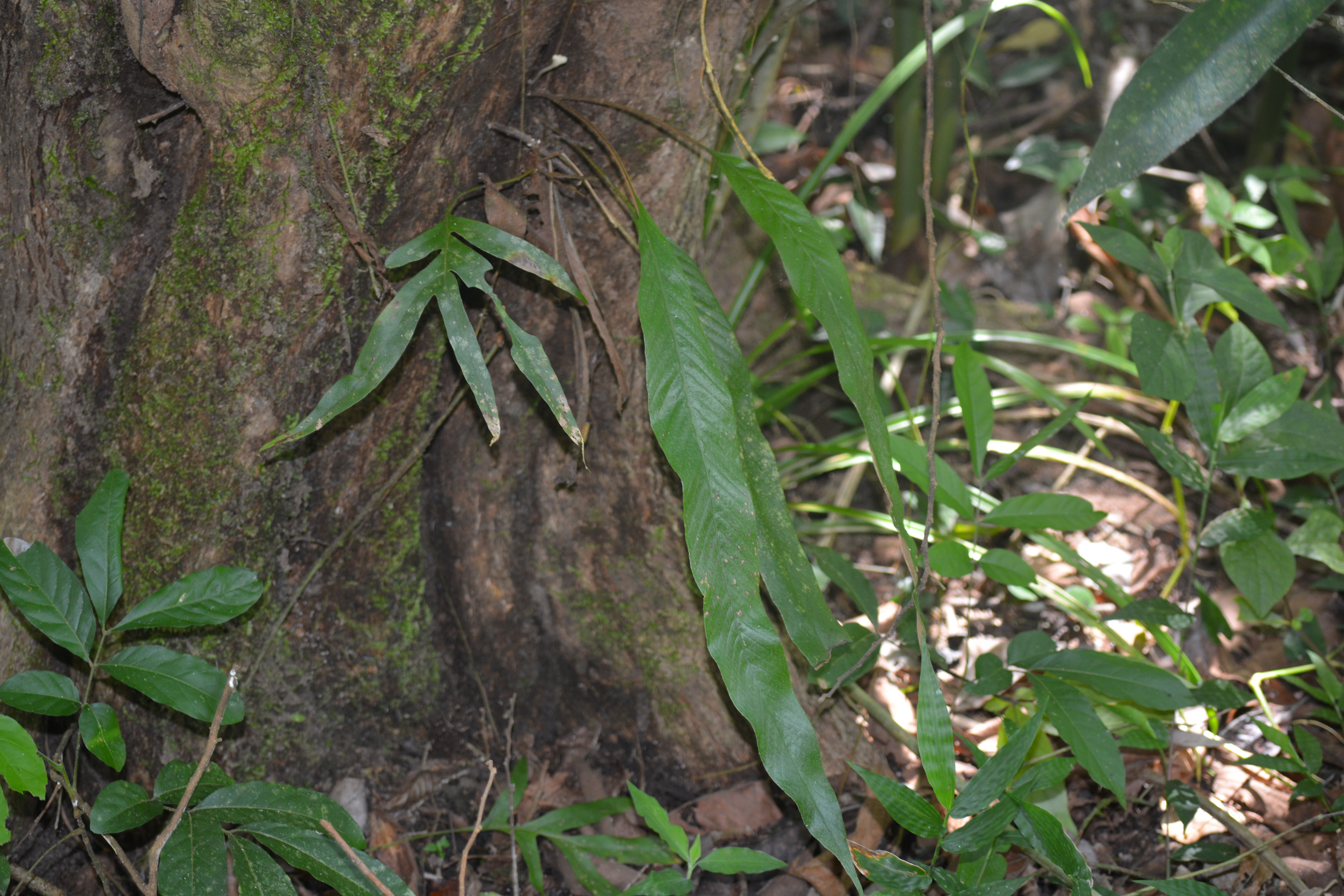
- in Ujung Kulon National Park, Indonesia

Scientific classification
- Kingdom: Plantae
- Clade: Tracheophytes
- Division: Polypodiophyta
- Class: Polypodiopsida
- Order: Polypodiales
- Suborder: Polypodiineae
- Family: Polypodiaceae
- Genus: Pyrrosia
- Species: P. stigmosa

Binomial name
- Pyrrosia stigmosa (Sw.) Ching, 1935

Synonyms
- Cyclophorus stigmosus Desv.; Niphobolus stigmosus T.Moore; Polypodium stigmosum Sw.

= Pyrrosia stigmosa =

Species of fern

Pyrrosia stigmosa is an epiphytic fern in the family Polypodiaceae. It is native to China (Yunnan, Sichuan, Hubei, Chongqing, Guizhou), Tibet, Indochina, Peninsular Malaysia, Sumatra, the Lesser Sunda Islands, Sulawesi, and New Guinea
