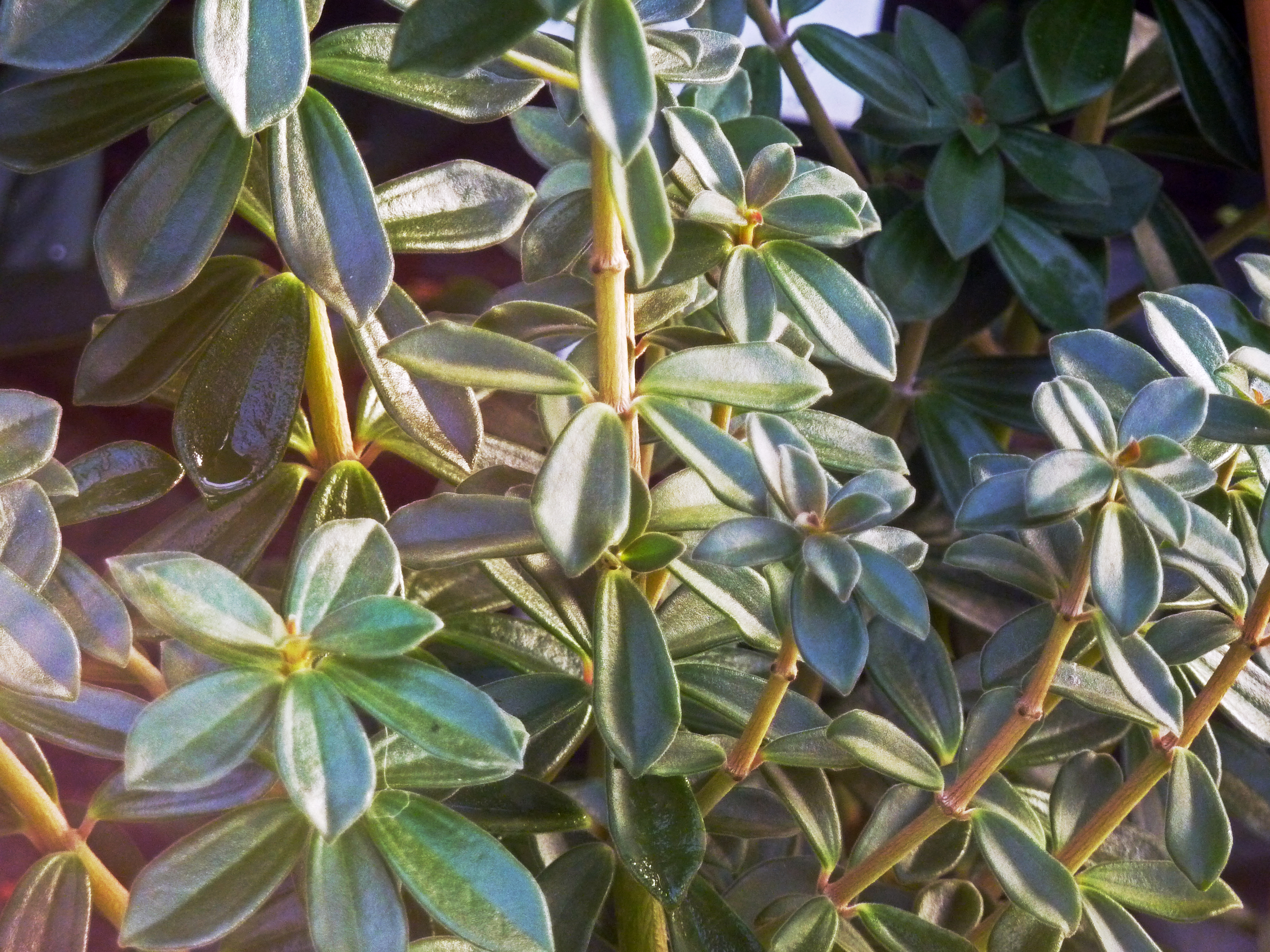

Scientific classification
- Kingdom: Plantae
- Clade: Tracheophytes
- Clade: Angiosperms
- Clade: Magnoliids
- Order: Piperales
- Family: Piperaceae
- Genus: Peperomia
- Species: P. camptotricha

Binomial name
- Peperomia camptotricha Miq.

= Peperomia camptotricha =

Species of flowering plant

Peperomia camptotricha is a species of plant in the family Piperaceae endemic to Mexico.
