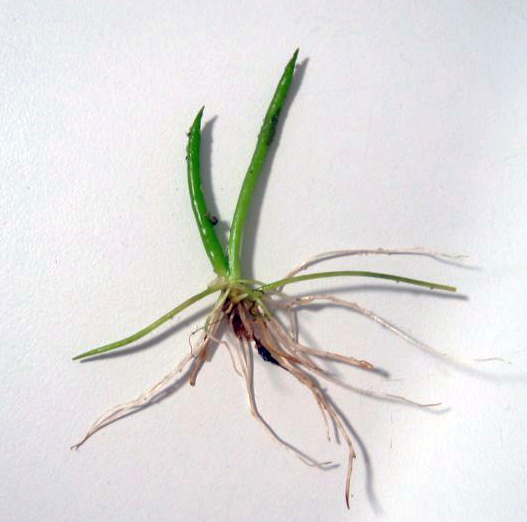
- Littorella uniflora

Scientific classification
- Kingdom: Plantae
- Clade: Tracheophytes
- Clade: Angiosperms
- Clade: Eudicots
- Clade: Asterids
- Order: Lamiales
- Family: Plantaginaceae
- Tribe: Plantagineae
- Genus: Littorella (L.) Asch.

Species
- Littorella uniflora Littorella americana Littorella australis

= Littorella =

Genus of flowering plants

Littorella is a genus of two to three species of aquatic plants. Many plants live their entire lives submerged, and reproduce by stolons, but some are only underwater for part of the year, and flower when they are not underwater.

== Classification ==
Molecular data show Littorella to be sister to the rest of the genus Plantago. Thus, cladistics would allow it to be considered either as a separate genus or as part of Plantago. Some researchers, particularly Rahn in the 1990s, have considered Littorella to be located within Plantago, but this does not seem to be required given the molecular data and a closer look at morphology.

== Species ==
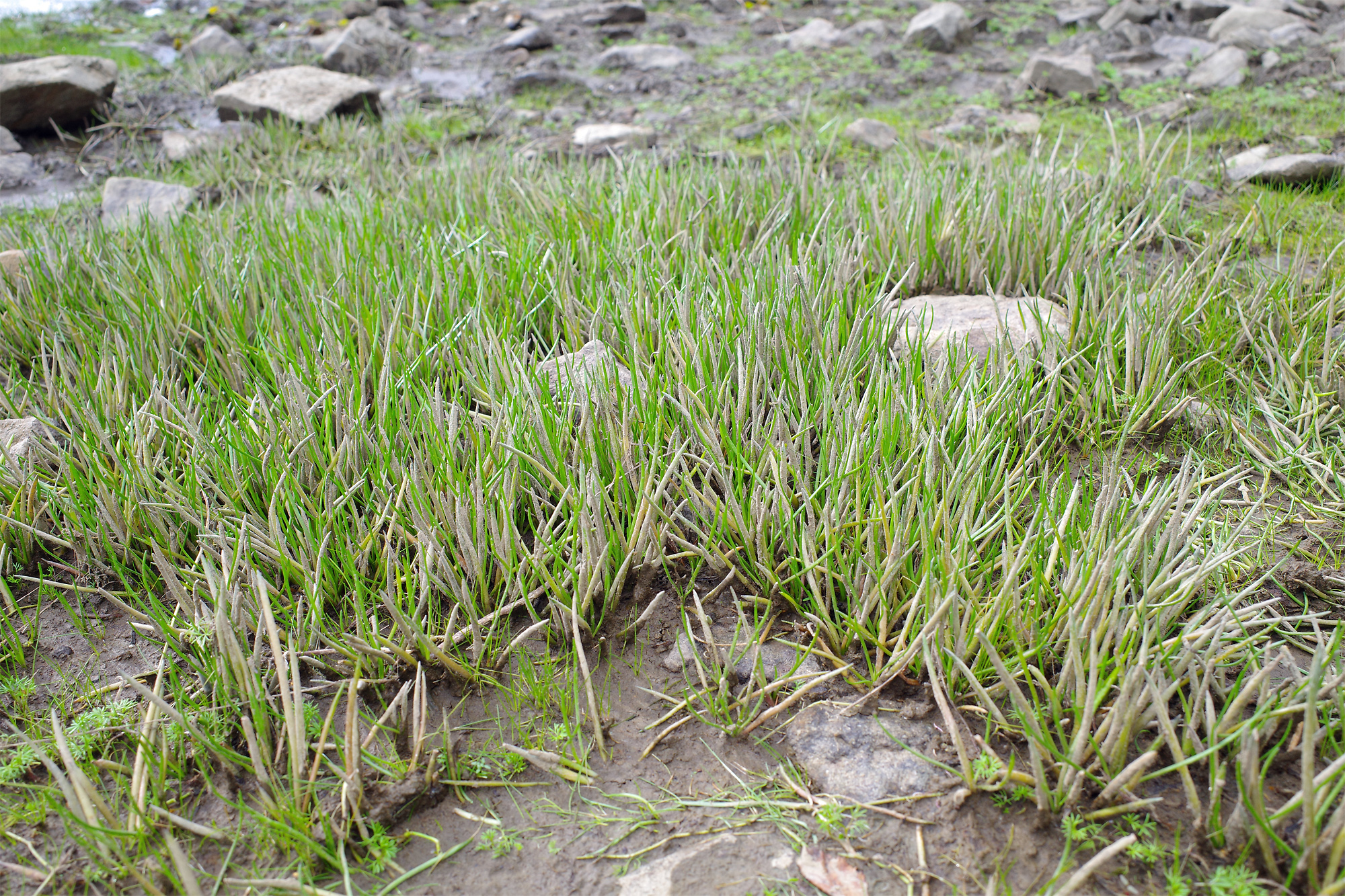
L. uniflora growing at the banks of a sandy pool

- Littorella uniflora. Found in Europe from Iceland to the Black Sea.
- Littorella americana from northern North America.
- Littorella australis from patagonia, in southern Chile and Argentina, and the Falkland Islands

Some authors have treated L. uniflora and L. americana to be one species, but molecular data show L. americana to be more closely related to L. australis than it is to L. uniflora, which argues for recognizing three species. Other considerations, such as the wider range and more frequent flowering of L. uniflora, also argue for separate species. It seems likely that the genus originated in Europe and first spread to North America, and from there to South America, with both events happening in the Pleistocene or later.

== Distribution ==
The European species is found in a wide range of habitats, from arctic to Mediterranean. The North and South American species are found in a more limited range of temperate climates.
