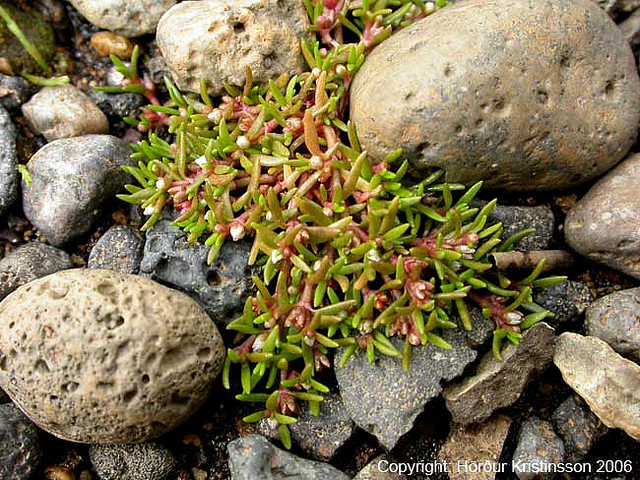

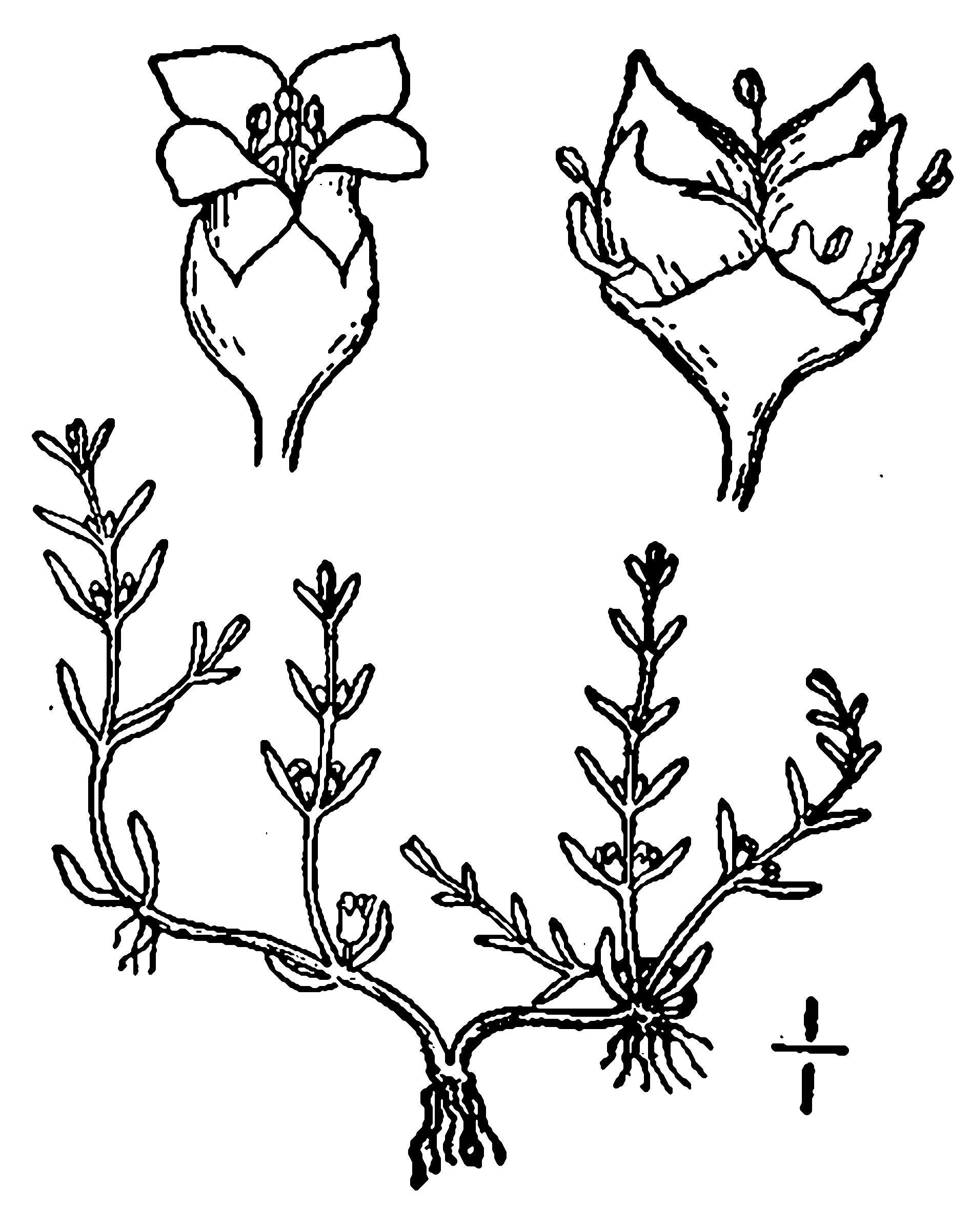
- Crassula aquatica

Scientific classification
- Kingdom: Plantae
- Clade: Tracheophytes
- Clade: Angiosperms
- Clade: Eudicots
- Order: Saxifragales
- Family: Crassulaceae
- Genus: Crassula
- Species: C. aquatica

Binomial name
- Crassula aquatica (L.) Schönl.

Synonyms
- Bulliarda aquatica Hydrophylla aquatica Tillaea angustifolia Tillaea aquatica Tillaea ascendens Tillaeastrum aquaticum

= Crassula aquatica =

Water pygmyweed

Species of aquatic plant

Crassula aquatica is a succulent plant known by the common names water pygmyweed, common pygmyweed and just pigmyweed. It is an annual plant of salt marshes, vernal pools, wetlands, and other fresh to brackish water bodies. It is at least partially aquatic, living in areas which are submersed much of the time. It also lives along muddy banks and in tidally-active areas of estuaries.

== Description ==
Crassula aquatica is a small plant forming thin mats or small patches on mud and sand, and growing more erect when exposed to open air for longer periods. The flesh of the plant is greenish-yellow to bright red or purplish. The tiny fleshy pointed leaves are only a few millimeters long.

A flower grows on a short stalk from the intersection of each oppositely-arranged pair of leaves. The flower is only about two millimeters long and wide. The fruit is a minute follicle containing several seeds.

== Distribution and habitat ==
This plant is widespread across North America and Eurasia. It is an annual plant of salt marshes, vernal pools, wetlands, and other fresh to brackish water bodies. It is at least partially aquatic, living in areas which are submersed much of the time. It also lives along muddy banks and in tidally-active areas of estuaries.

== Conservation ==
It is listed as a vulnerable species in Newfoundland and Labrador. Cavan Allen rediscovered Crassula aquatica in Maryland in 2012 after it had been last seen in that state in 1950.
