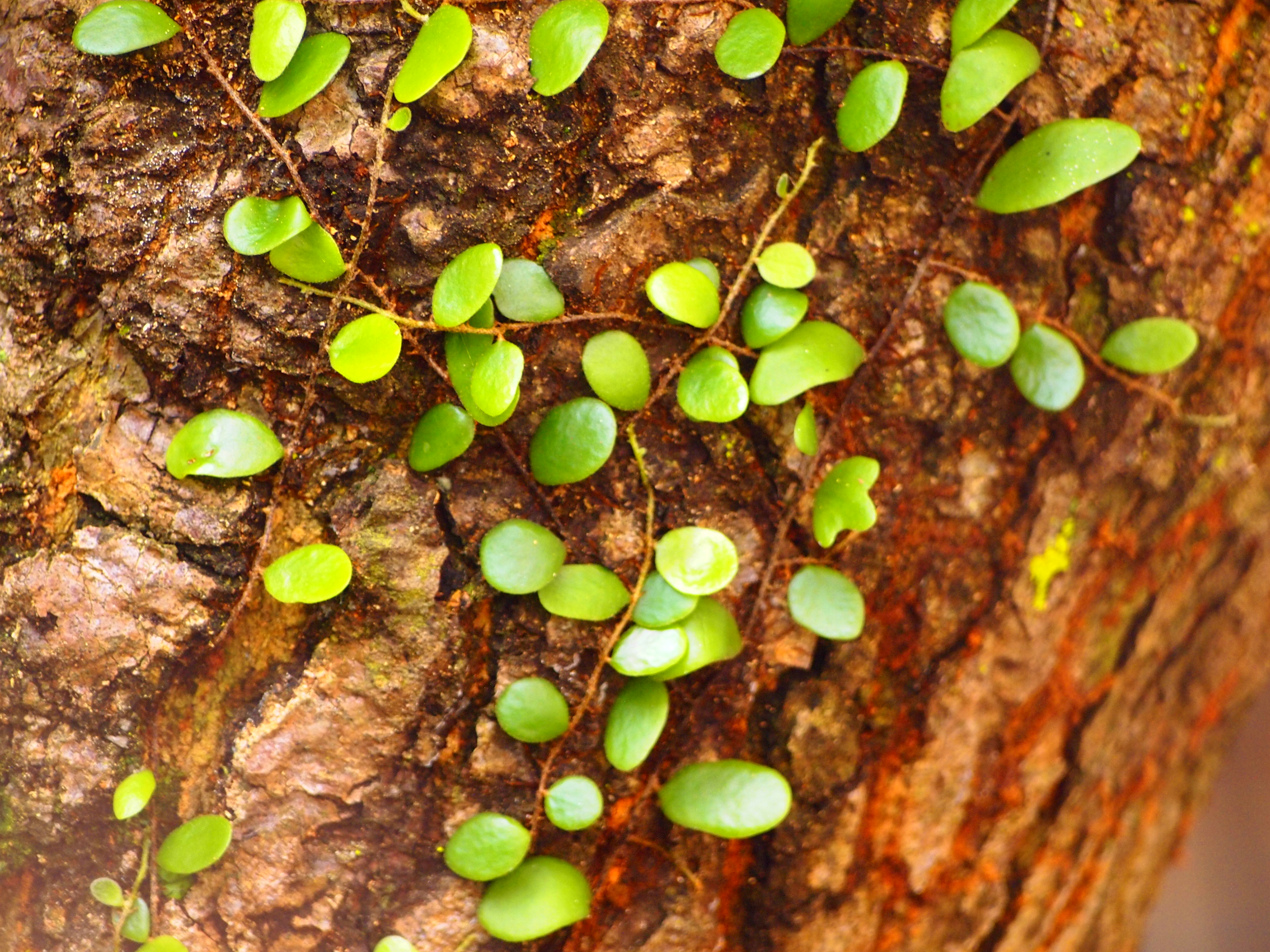
- Pyrrosia piloselloides

Scientific classification
- Kingdom: Plantae
- Clade: Tracheophytes
- Division: Polypodiophyta
- Class: Polypodiopsida
- Order: Polypodiales
- Suborder: Polypodiineae
- Family: Polypodiaceae
- Subfamily: Platycerioideae
- Genus: Pyrrosia; Mirb.

Species
- See article

Synonyms
- Apalophlebia C.Presl; Candollea Mirb.; Cyclophorus Desv.; Drymoglossum C.Presl; Galeoglossa C.Presl; Gyrosorium C.Presl; Neoniphopsis Nakai; Niphobolus Kaulf.; Niphopsis J.Sm.; Oetosis Kuntze; Polycampium C.Presl; Pteropsis Desv.; Saxiglossum Ching; Scytopteris C.Presl; Sphaerostichum C.Presl; Nesoris Raf.

= Pyrrosia =

Genus of ferns

Pyrrosia is a genus of about 100 fern species in the polypod family, Polypodiaceae. Like other species in Polypodiaceae, the species of Pyrrosia are generally epiphytic on trees or rocks, a few species are terrestrial. The Latin name of Pyrrosia comes from the Greek pyrrhos (red), which refers to its leaves that are red due to the sporangia.

== Species list ==
- Pyrrosia abbreviata (Zoll. & Mor.) Hovenkamp
- Pyrrosia adnascens (Sw.) Ching
- Pyrrosia angustata (Sw.) Ching
- Pyrrosia angustissima (Giesenh. ex Diels) Tagawa & K. Iwats.
- Pyrrosia assimilis (Baker) Ching
- Pyrrosia asterosora (Baker) Hovenkamp
- Pyrrosia blepharolepis (C. Chr.) Ching
- Pyrrosia boothii (Hook.) Ching
- Pyrrosia borneensis (Copel.) K.H. Shing
- Pyrrosia brassii (Copel.) Pic. Serm.
- Pyrrosia christii (Giesenh.) Ching
- Pyrrosia confluens (R. Br.) Ching
- Pyrrosia costata (Wall. ex C. Presl) Tagawa & K. Iwats.
- Pyrrosia dimorpha X.H. Guo & S.B. Zhou
- Pyrrosia dispar (H. Christ) K.H. Shing
- Pyrrosia distichocarpa (Mett.) K.H. Shing
- Pyrrosia drakeana (Franch.) Ching
- Pyrrosia eleagnifolia (Bory) Hovenkamp
- Pyrrosia fengiana Ching
- Pyrrosia flocculosa (D. Don) Ching
- Pyrrosia foveolata (Alston) C.V. Morton
- Pyrrosia fuohaiensis Ching & K.H. Shing
- Pyrrosia gardneri (Mett.) Sledge
- Pyrrosia hastata (Thunb.) Ching
- Pyrrosia heterophylla (L.) M.G. Price
- Pyrrosia intermedia (Goy) K.H. Shing
- Pyrrosia laevis (J. Sm. ex Bedd.) Ching
- Pyrrosia lanceolata (L.) Farw.
- Pyrrosia liebuschii (Hieron.) Schelpe
- Pyrrosia linearifolia (Hook.) Ching
- Pyrrosia lingua (Thunb.) Farw.
- Pyrrosia longifolia (Burm. f.) C.V. Morton
- Pyrrosia macrocarpa (Copel.) K.H. Shing
- Pyrrosia madagascariensis (C. Chr.) Schelpe
- Pyrrosia mannii (Giesenh.) Ching
- Pyrrosia matsudai (Hayata) Tagawa
- Pyrrosia mechowii Alston
- Pyrrosia micraster (Copel.) Tagawa
- Pyrrosia mollis (Kunze) Ching
- Pyrrosia novo-guineae (H. Christ) M.G. Price
- Pyrrosia nummulariifolia (Sw.) Ching
- Pyrrosia oblanceolata (C. Chr.) Tardieu
- Pyrrosia obovata (Blume) Ching
- Pyrrosia pannosa (Mett. ex Kuhn) Ching
- Pyrrosia petiolosa (H. Christ) Ching
- Pyrrosia piloselloides (L.) M.G. Price
- Pyrrosia polydactylos (Hance) Ching
- Pyrrosia porosa (C. Presl) Hovenkamp
- Pyrrosia princeps (Mett.) C.V. Morton
- Pyrrosia pseudodrakeana K.H. Shing
- Pyrrosia rasamalae (Racib.) K.H. Shing
- Pyrrosia rhodesiana (C. Chr.) Schelpe
- Pyrrosia rupestris Ching
- Pyrrosia samarensis (C. Presl) Ching
- Pyrrosia scolopendrina Ching
- Pyrrosia sheareri (Baker) Ching
- Pyrrosia shennongensis K.H. Shing
- Pyrrosia similis Ching
- Pyrrosia sphaerosticha (Mett.) Ching
- Pyrrosia stigmosa (Sw.) Ching
- Pyrrosia stolzii (Hieron.) Schelpe
- Pyrrosia subfurfuracea (Hook.) Ching
- Pyrrosia transmorrisonensis (Hayata) Ching
- Pyrrosia tricholepis (Carr. ex Seemann) Ching
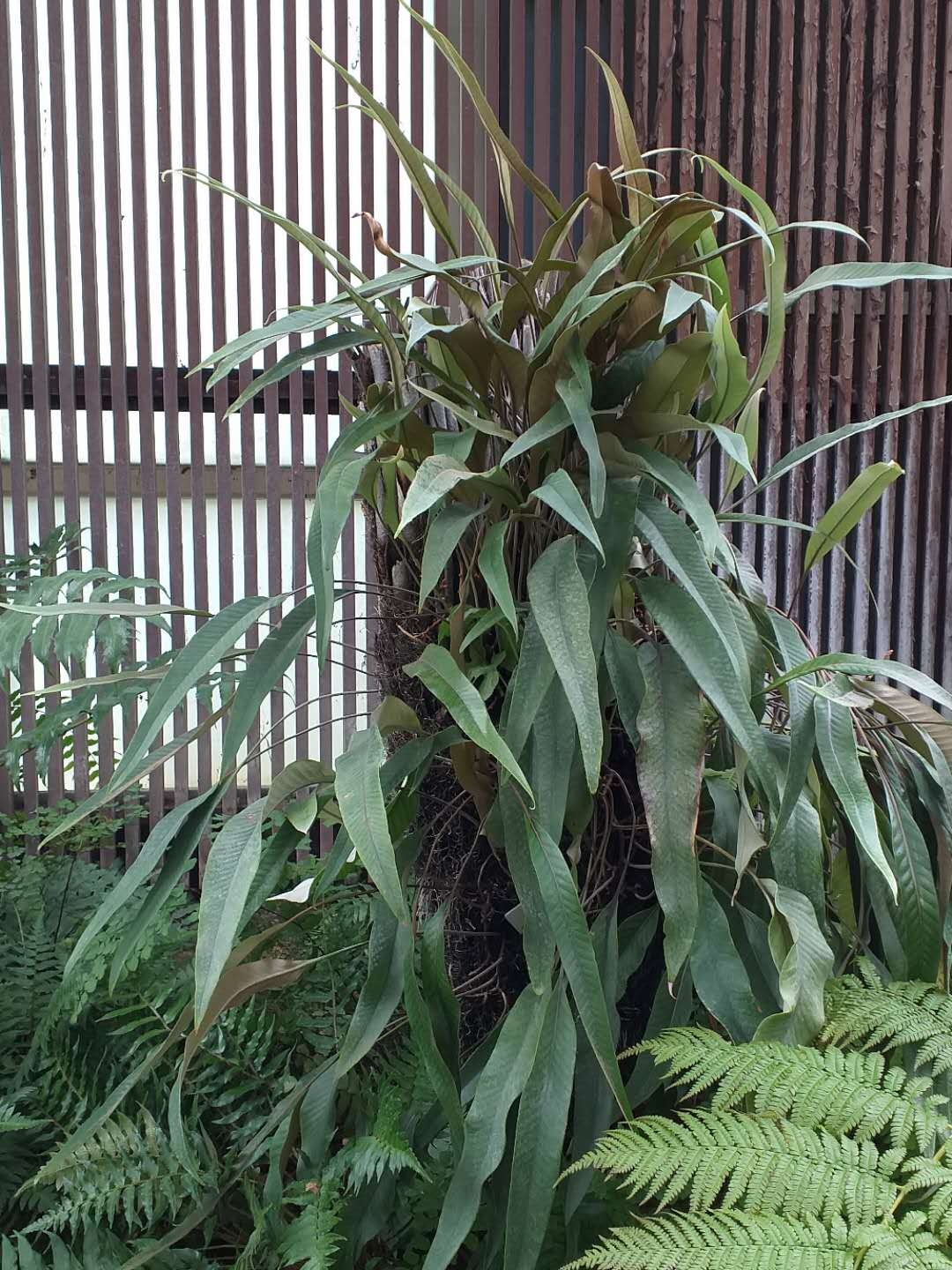
Pyrrosia lingua

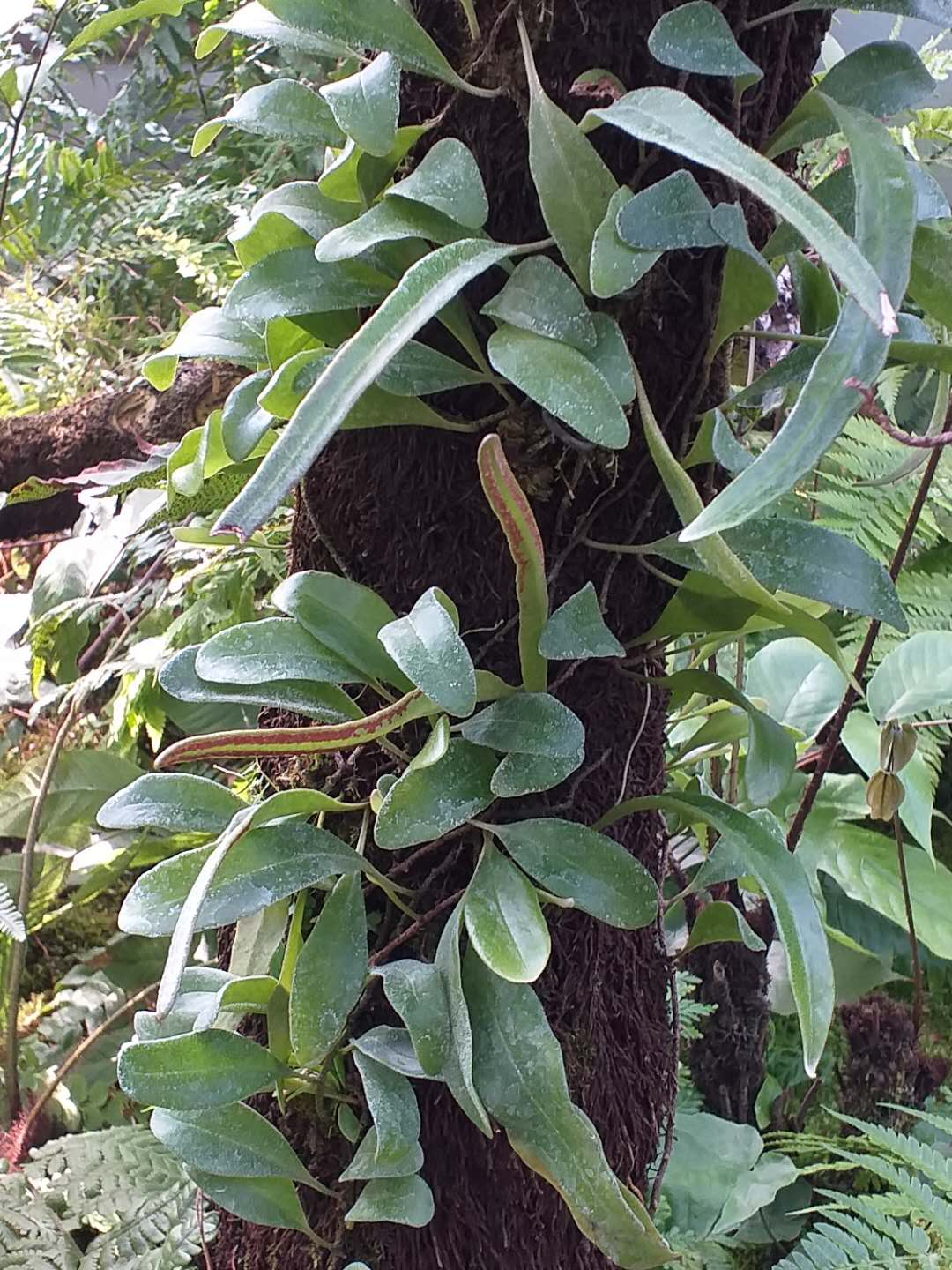
Pyrrosia adnascens

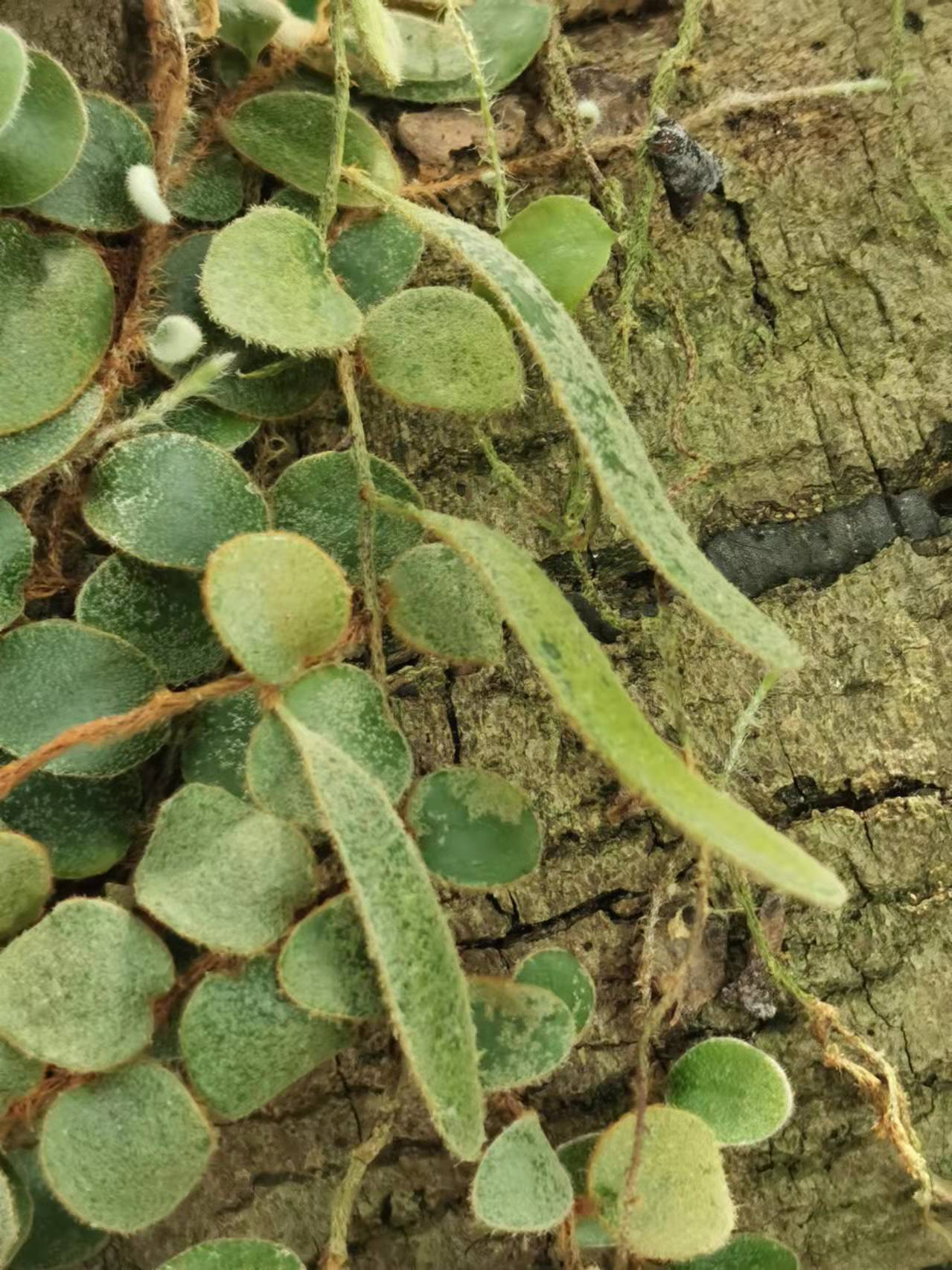
Pyrrosia nummulariifolia

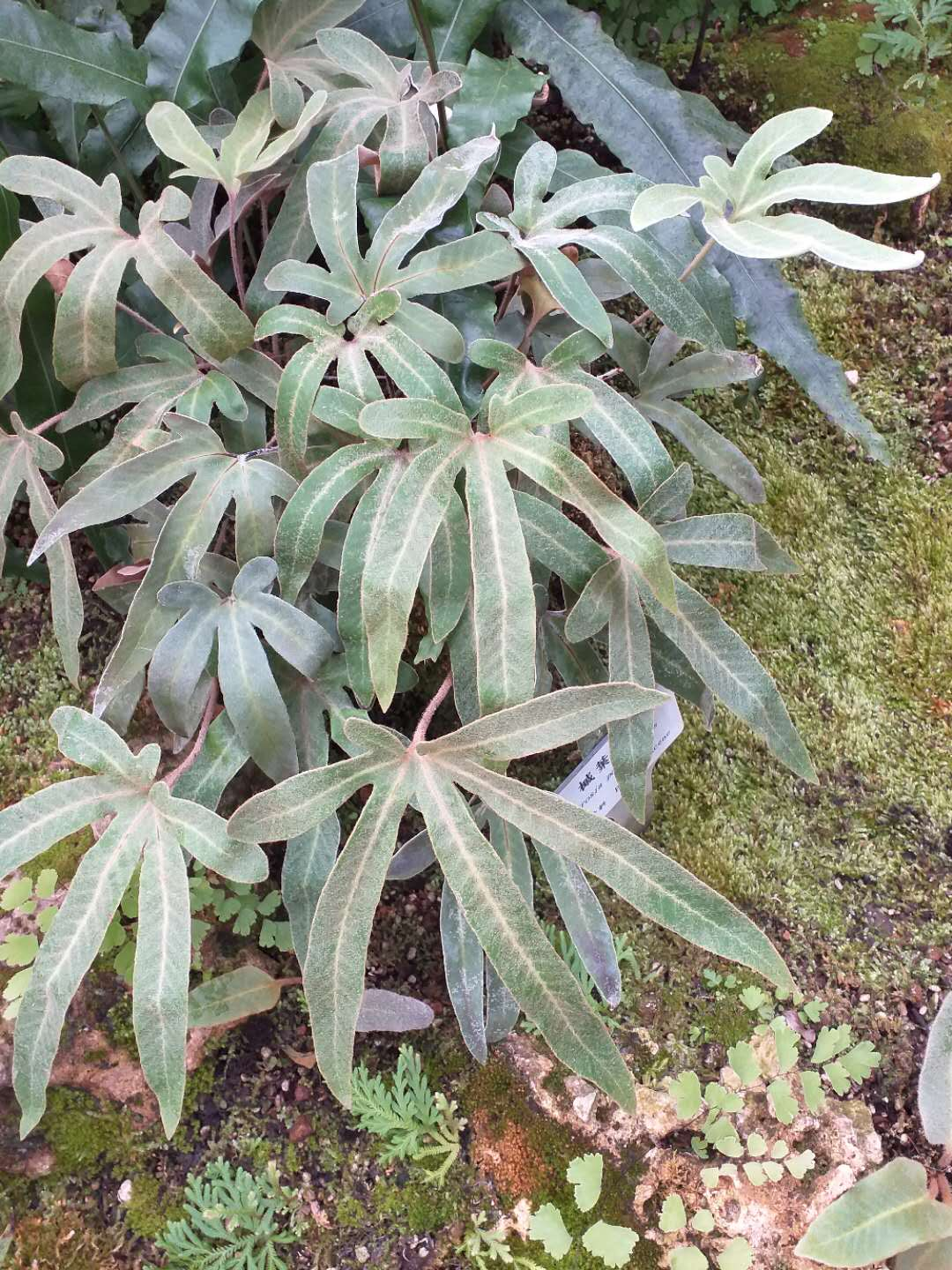
Pyrrosia polydactyla
