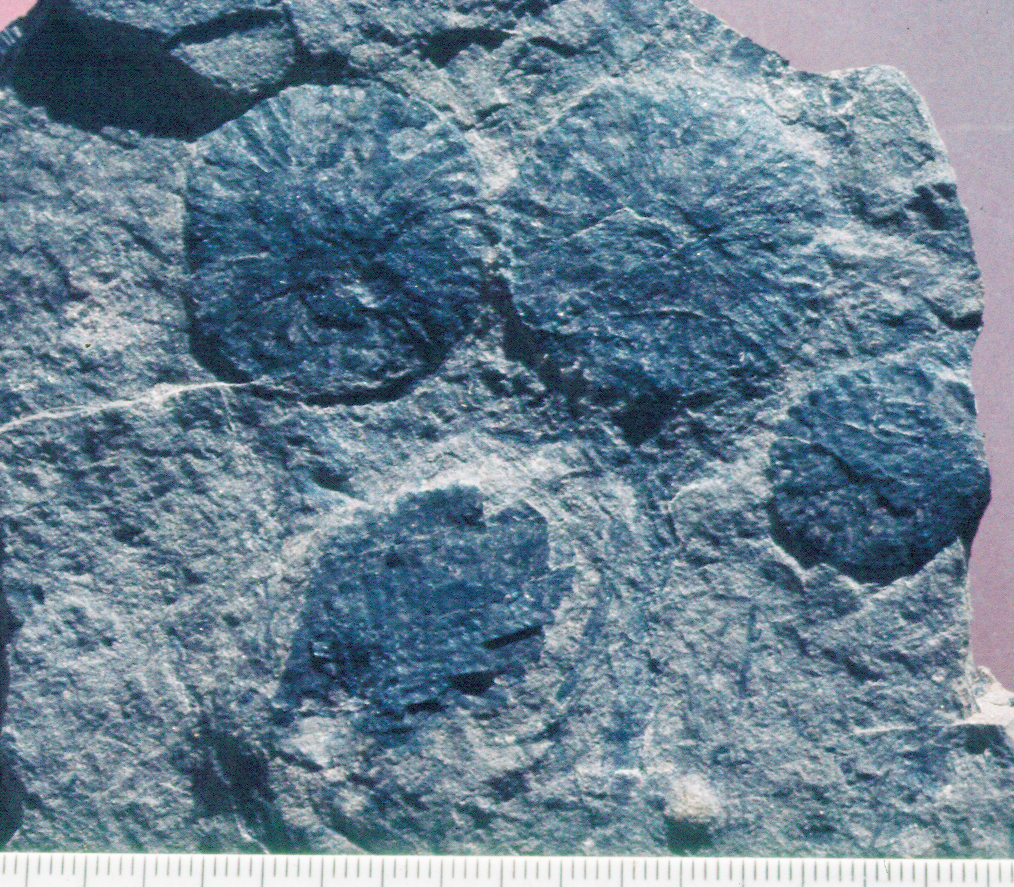
- Cones of Cylostrobus sydneyensis from the Early Triassic Newport Formation near Narrabeen, NSW, Australia.

Scientific classification
- Kingdom: Plantae
- Clade: Tracheophytes
- Clade: Lycophytes
- Class: Lycopodiopsida
- Order: Isoetales
- Family: †Pleuromeiaceae
- Genus: †Cylostrobus; Retallack 1995

Species
- Cylostrobus indicus India; Cylostrobus ornatus Argentina; Cylostrobus sydneyensis Australia

= Cylostrobus =

Cylostrobus Temporal range: Early Triassic

Extinct genus of spore-bearing plants

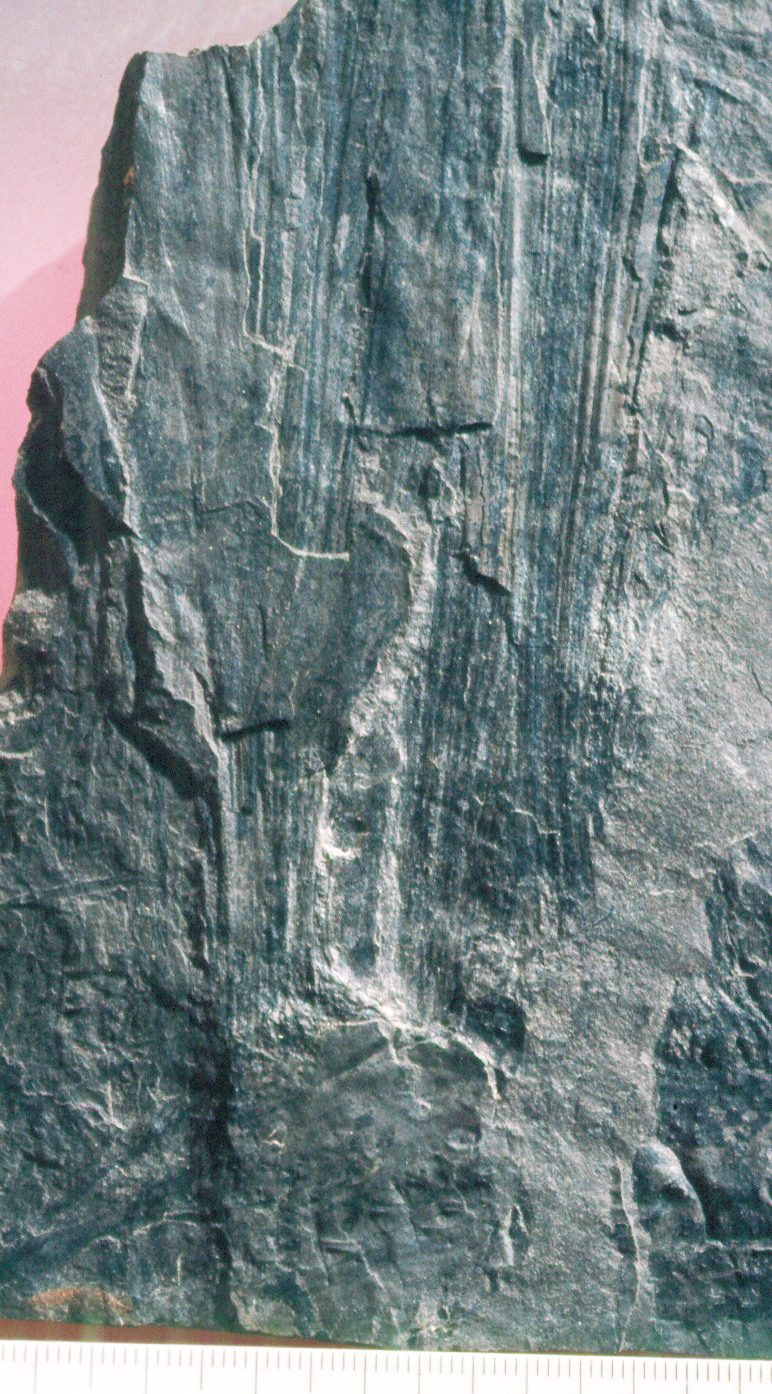
Leafy apex of Cylostrobus sydneyensis from the Early Triassic Newport Formation near Avalon, NSW

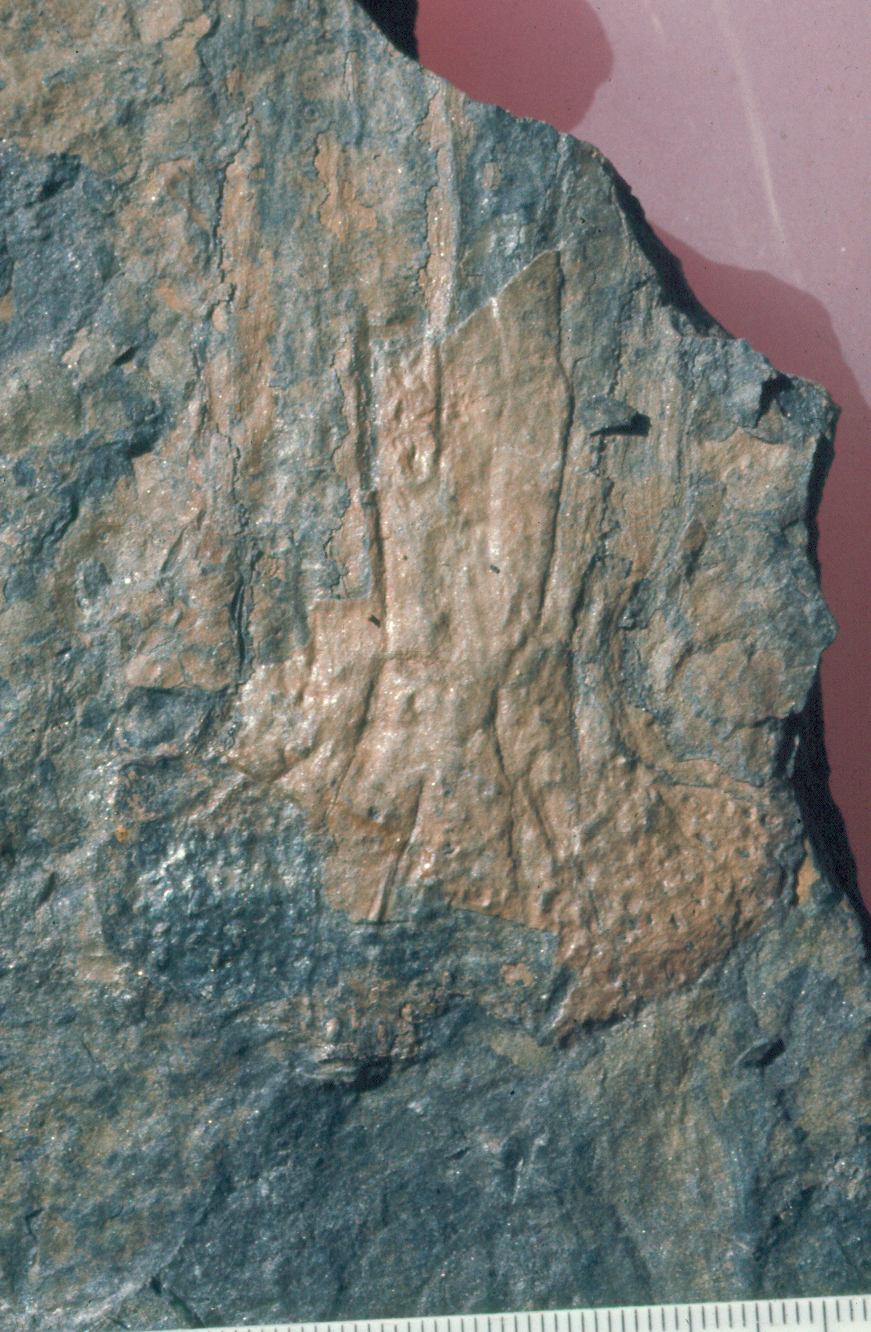
Corm of Cylostrobus sydneyensis from the Early Triassic Newport Formation near Avalon, NSW

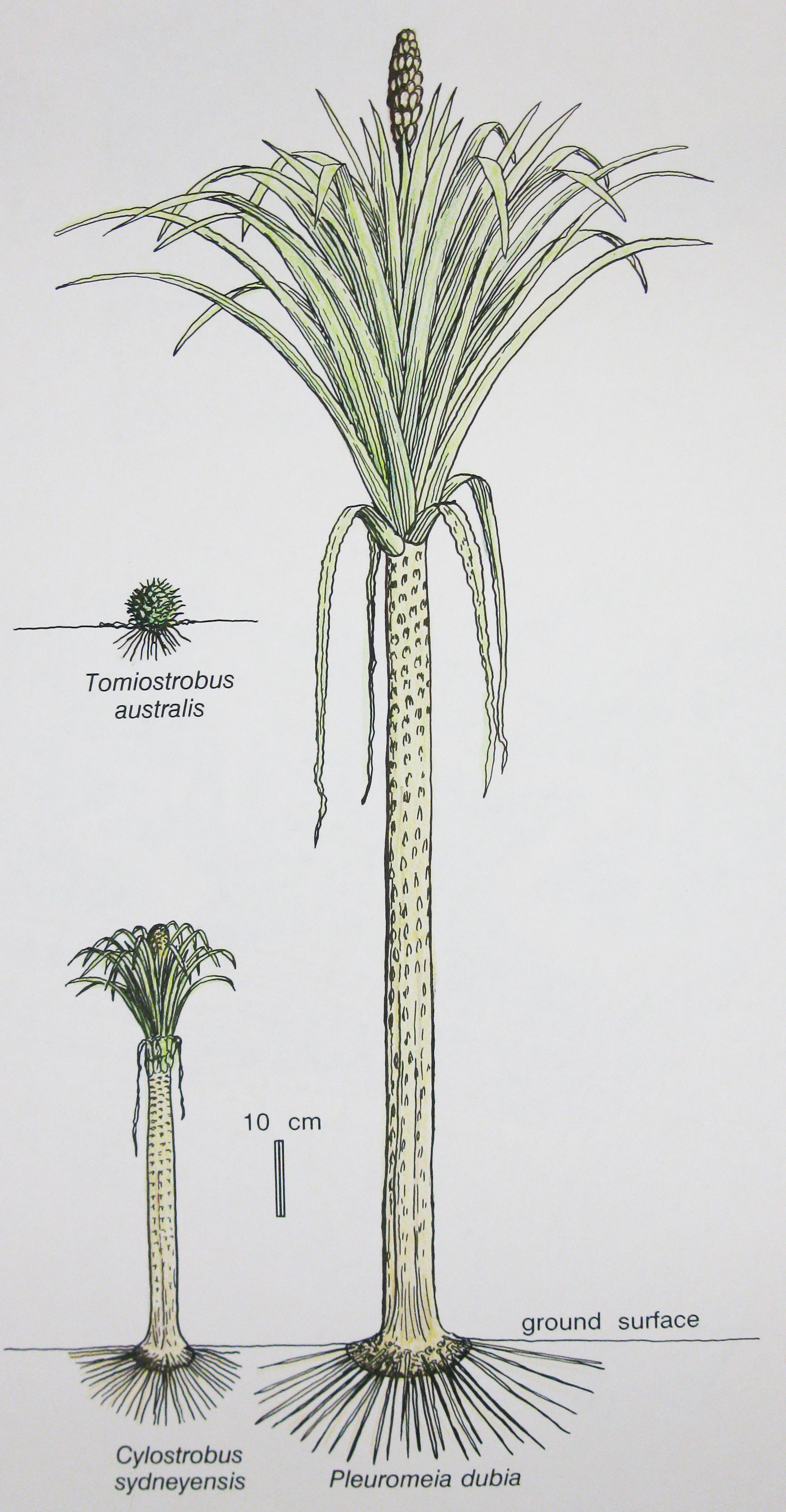
Reconstructions of extinct lycopsids Pleuromeia dubia and Cylostrobus sydneyensis (Pleuromeiaceae and Tomiostrobus australis (Isoetaceae) all from the Early Triassic Gosford and Newport Formations of the Sydney Basin, NSW, Australia.

Cylostrobus is genus of Lycopsida most like Pleuromeia, but with very compact and round cones. It is known from the Early Triassic of Australia, coincident with a marked greenhouse spike at the end of the Early Triassic. The genus Cylostrobus was erected for the compact cone only, in the paleobotanical system of form genera, but these small plants are well enough understood that the name Cylostrobus sydneyensis is used for the whole plant, rather than the old name Pleuromeia longicaulis. Other species of Pleuromeia have attached cones that are less compact and produce different spores.

== See also ==
- Evolution of plants
