= Appalachian quillwort =

Appalachian quillwort is a common name for several plants and may refer to:

- Isoetes appalachiana, native to the eastern United States
- Isoetes engelmannii, native to eastern North America
