= Isoetes valida =

Conservation status
- Apparently Secure (NatureServe)

Scientific classification
- Kingdom: Plantae
- Clade: Tracheophytes
- Clade: Lycophytes
- Class: Lycopodiopsida
- Order: Isoetales
- Family: Isoetaceae
- Genus: Isoetes
- Species: I. valida

Binomial name
- Isoetes valida (Engelm.) Clute

Synonyms
- I. engelmannii var. valida

Species of spore-bearing plant

Isoetes valida, commonly known as the strong quillwort or true quillwort, is an aquatic lycophyte native to eastern North America. It is found primarily in the Appalachian Mountains from Pennsylvania south to Alabama and Georgia. In addition, one collection of the plant was made in a railway ditch in Wilmington, Delaware in the 1860s, but this was most likely an accidental introduction.

Some sources consider Isoetes caroliniana a synonym of this species, others regard it as a separate species.
