= Isoetes caroliniana =

Scientific classification
- Kingdom: Plantae
- Clade: Tracheophytes
- Clade: Lycophytes
- Class: Lycopodiopsida
- Order: Isoetales
- Family: Isoetaceae
- Genus: Isoetes
- Species: I. caroliniana

Binomial name
- Isoetes caroliniana (A.A.Eaton) Luebke 1992

Synonyms
- Isoetes engelmannii var. caroliniana Eaton

Southeastern United States species of quillwort

Isoetes caroliniana, common name Carolina quillwort, is a wetlands plant native to the mountains of Tennessee, North Carolina, Virginia and West Virginia. It is an emergent plant found in lakes and bogs. It is closely related to I. georgiana (the Georgia quillwort) but can be distinguished by its unpigmented sporangium wall.

Some sources regard it as a synonym of Isoetes valida, but others treat it as a full species.
