= Ligule =

Part of plant leaf or flower

A ligule (from Latin: ligula "strap", variant of lingula, from lingua "tongue") is a thin outgrowth at the junction of leaf and leafstalk of many grasses (family Poaceae) and sedges (family Cyperaceae). A ligule is also a strap-shaped extension of the corolla, such as that of a ray floret in plants in the daisy family Asteraceae.

== Poaceae and Cyperaceae ==
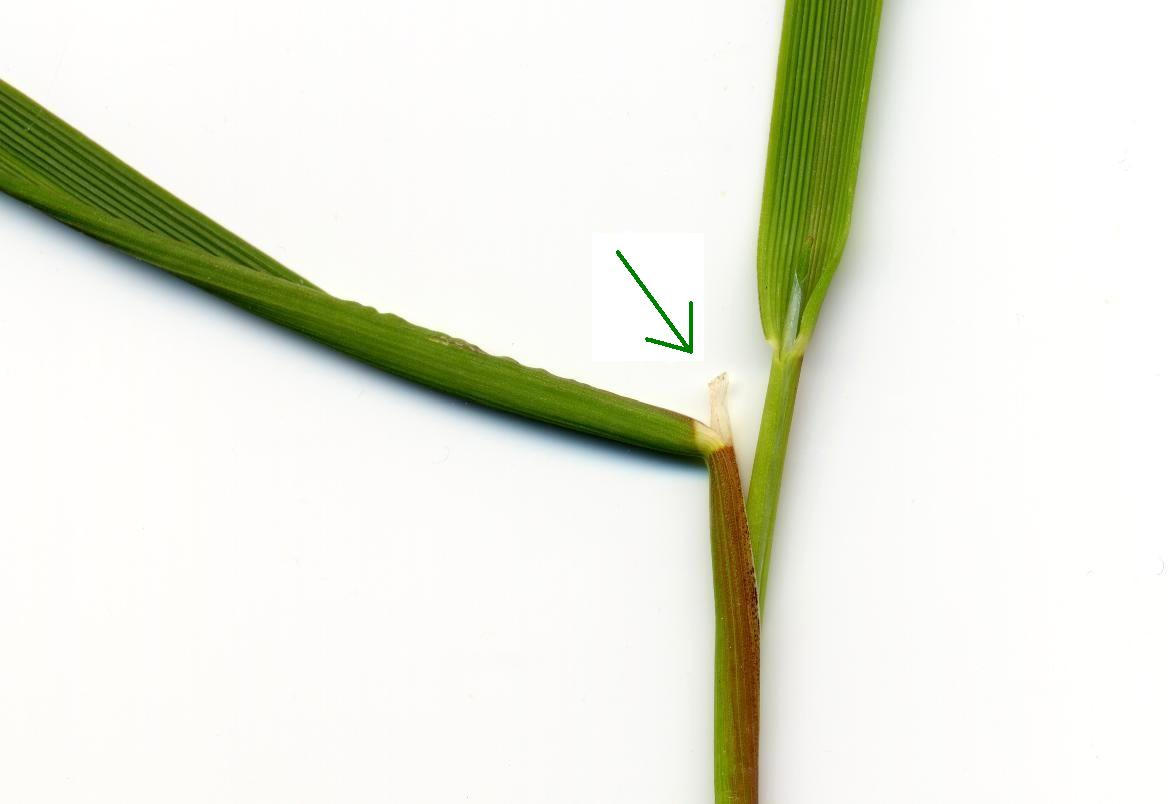

The ligule is part of the leaf that is found at the junction of the blade and sheath of the leaf. It may take several forms, but it is commonly some form of translucent membrane or a fringe of hairs. The membranous ligule can be very short 1–2 mm (Kentucky bluegrass, Poa pratensis) to very long 10–20 mm (Johnson grass, Sorghum halepense), it can also be smooth on the edge or very ragged. Some grasses do not have a ligule, for example barnyardgrass (Echinochloa crus-galli).

A ligule can also be defined as a membrane-like tissue or row of delicate hairs typically found in grasses at the junction of the leaf sheath and blade. The ligule appears to be a continuation of the leaf sheath and encircles or clasps the stem as does the leaf sheath. The three basic types of ligules are: membranous, a fringe of hairs (ciliate), and absent or lacking. Most grasses have ligules, and the shape, length, and appearance of the ligule margin provide consistent characters for separating genera and some species of grasses.

Ligulate floret, typical for flowers of some members of the family Asteraceae: A. ovary B. pappus C. theca D. ligule E. style with stamen

In grass-like plants such as sedges (Cyperaceae) and rushes (Juncaceae), ligules are usually absent or poorly developed.

== Asteraceae ==
In members of Asteraceae, a ligule is the elongated tongue of the corolla of a ray flower or ligulate flower.

== Lycopodiopsida ==
The microphylls of Lycopodiophyta of the heterosporous families Selaginellaceae (spikemosses or lesser clubmosses) and Isoetaceae (quillworts) have minute, scale-like flaps of tissue called ligules at the base of the upper surface of each leaf blade. This feature distinguishes them from the family Lycopodiaceae (clubmosses). It is assumed to have originated at least 408 million years ago, and is multicellular in origin in spikemosses and unicellular in origin in quillworts.
