= Cylomeia =

Cylomeia Temporal range: Early Triassic, ~251.902–246.7 Ma

Scientific classification
- Kingdom: Plantae
- Clade: Tracheophytes
- Clade: Lycophytes
- Class: Lycopodiopsida
- Order: Isoetales
- Family: †Pleuromeiaceae
- Genus: †Cylomeia; White (1981)

Species
- †Cylomeia undulata; †Cylomeia longicaulus; †Cylomeia sp.

Extinct genus of lycopsid plants

Cylomeia is a genus of extinct lycopsid from the Early Triassic of Australia. They bore a single, erect stem that likely grew to about a meter tall. Previously identified as Pleuromeia, it can be distinguished by its monoecious habits, singular leaf base scar (as opposed to the two scars found on each leaf base in Pleuromeia) and either unlobed or lightly lobed rhizophore. Cylomeia often grew in swamps, filling a niche analogous to that of mangrove trees.
