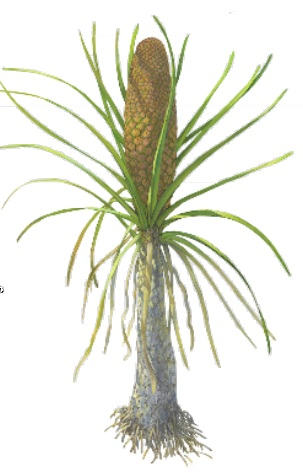
- Life restoration of Lycostrobus scottii

Scientific classification
- Kingdom: Plantae
- Clade: Tracheophytes
- Clade: Lycophytes
- Class: Lycopodiopsida
- Order: Isoetales
- Family: †Pleuromeiaceae
- Genus: †Lycostrobus; Nathorst (1908)

Type species
- †Lycostrobus scottii Nathorst (1908)

Species
- †Lycostrobus scottii

= Lycostrobus =

Lycostrobus Temporal range: Rhaetian–Hettangian

Extinct genus of lycopsid

Lycostrobus is a genus of extinct lycophytes from the earliest Jurassic, making it the latest known surviving member of Pleuromeiaceae. Lycostrobus was widespread following the Triassic-Jurassic extinction event, suggesting that it may have served as a pioneer species taking advantage of the collapse of the forest systems of the Late Triassic. It was initially described by A. G. Nathorst in 1902 as the male flower of a cycadophyte, but later recovered spores from the strobilus resulted in its classification as a lycopsid.

== Description ==
Lycostrobus had characteristics and features similar to that of other pleuromeian lycopsids. It had a single, unbranching stem with leaves arranged helically along its length. It was likely shrub-sized, but due to its pleuromeian affinity, it may have grown over a meter tall. Lycostrobus bore a single, bisporangiate strobilus at the end of its stem measuring up to 5 cm wide and 11 cm long and produced both Aratrisporites microspores and Nathorstisporites hopliticus megaspores.

== Ecology ==
Immediately after the widespread deforestation following the Triassic-Jurassic extinction event, fossil records of N. hopliticus, megaspores characteristic of Lycostrobus, can be found first appearing and then proliferating in all regions globally except Australia, where it first appears in earlier Rhaetian. This cosmopolitan distribution, in conjunction with its shrub-like growth habits and very high production of disseminules suggest that, like many other pleuromeian and isoetacean lycopsids, Lycostrobus may have served as an opportunistic pioneer plant among the recovery vegetation in the aftermath of the Triassic-Jurassic extinction event.

== Taxonomy ==
Lycostrobus scottii was initially described in 1902 from a single impression found in upper Rhaetian shale deposits of Scania. It was originally interpreted as the male flower of a cycadophyte and placed in the genus Androstrobus as A. scotti. Upon further examination in 1908, what were previously identified as pollen sacs were discovered to be megaspores and previously unnoticed microspores were found with features similar to that of Isoëtes. To reflect these discoveries, it was reclassified as L. scotti within the class Lycopodiopsida.

In 1941, a specimen from the Upper Triassic of Arizona was described by L. H. Daugherty as L. chinleana, a species of Lycostrobus bearing a strobilus with similarities to Lepidostrobus. A later study in 1999 noted its similarities to both the cones of Calamites and sporangia of Equisetum. Thusly, it was proposed that the species could represent an intermediate stage between the two and assigned the species to the new Equisetalean genus Equicalastrobus.

The genus was placed in the family Pleuromeiaceae in 2021.
