= Isoetes appalachiana =

Conservation status
- Apparently Secure (NatureServe)

Scientific classification
- Kingdom: Plantae
- Clade: Tracheophytes
- Clade: Lycophytes
- Class: Lycopodiopsida
- Order: Isoetales
- Family: Isoetaceae
- Genus: Isoetes
- Species: I. appalachiana

Binomial name
- Isoetes appalachiana D.F.Brunton & D.M.Britton 1997

Synonyms
- Isoetes engelmannii var. georgiana Engelm.; Isoëtes appalachiana

Eastern North American species of quillwort

Isoetes appalachiana, commonly known as the Appalachian quillwort (not to be confused with its close relative Isoetes engelmannii, which shares the same common name), is an aquatic pteridophyte that is widely distributed in the eastern United States. It is most frequently encountered in wetlands at low to middle elevations of the Appalachian Mountains in Pennsylvania, though its range extends from there south to Florida and Alabama along the eastern slopes of the mountains. It is a tetraploid and is grouped in the Isoetes engelmannii complex.
