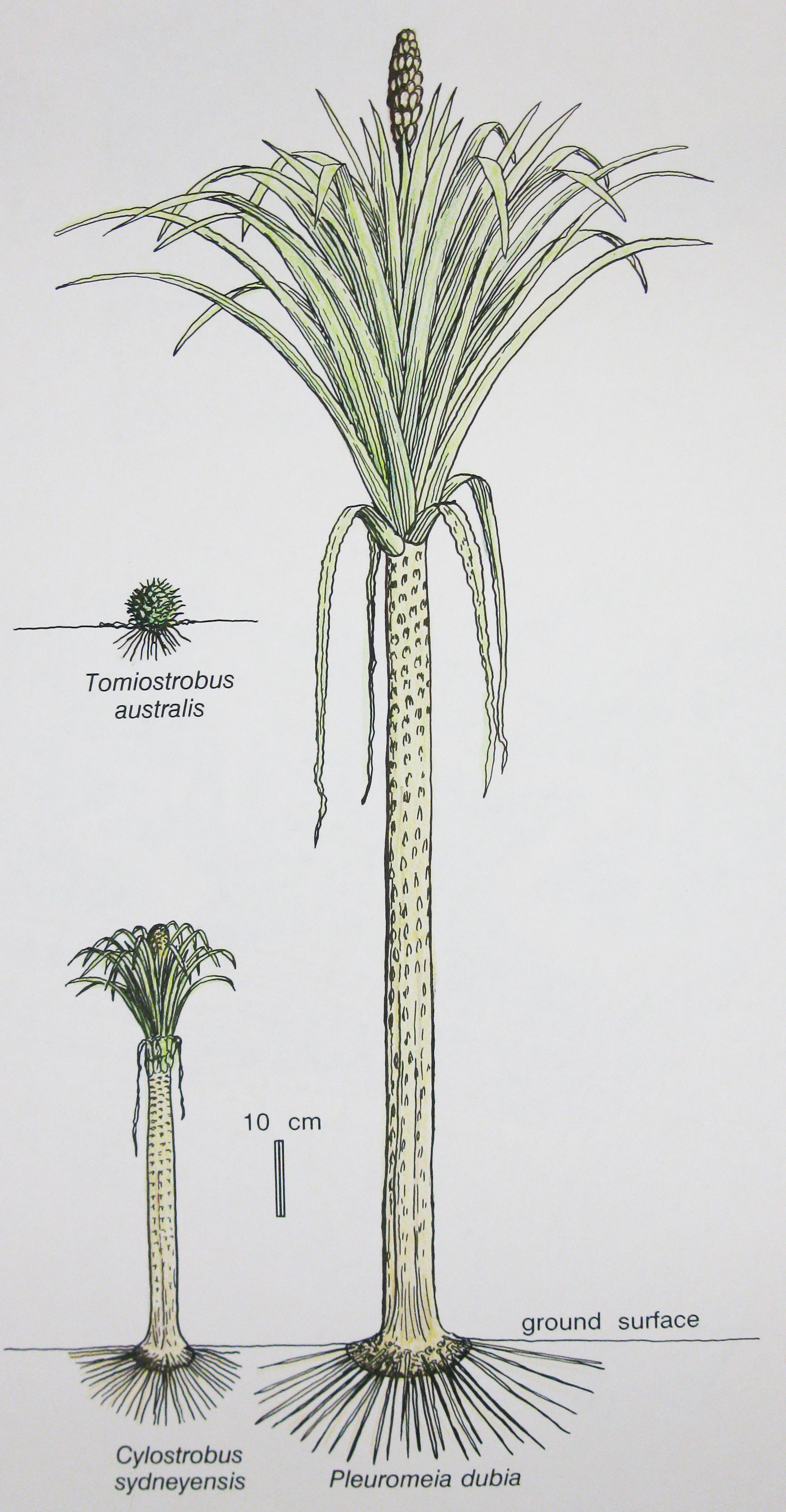
- Life restoration

Scientific classification
- Kingdom: Plantae
- Clade: Tracheophytes
- Clade: Lycophytes
- Class: Lycopodiopsida
- Order: Isoetales
- Family: †Pleuromeiaceae
- Genus: †Pleuromeia
- Species: †P. dubia

Binomial name
- †Pleuromeia dubia (Anderson and Anderson, 1985)

Synonyms
- Gregicaulis dubius

= Pleuromeia dubia =

Pleuromeia dubia Temporal range: Early Triassic

Species of spore-bearing plant

Pleuromeia dubia is a tall species for the genus, with distinctive elongate leaf scars, and known from the Early Triassic of Australia and South Africa. Like other species of Pleuromeia it was a survivor of the marked greenhouse spike at the end of the Early Triassic. It was originally assigned to the genus Gregicaulis, and its placement in the genus Pleuromeia has been questioned, due to its significant differences to the core Eurasian members of the genus.

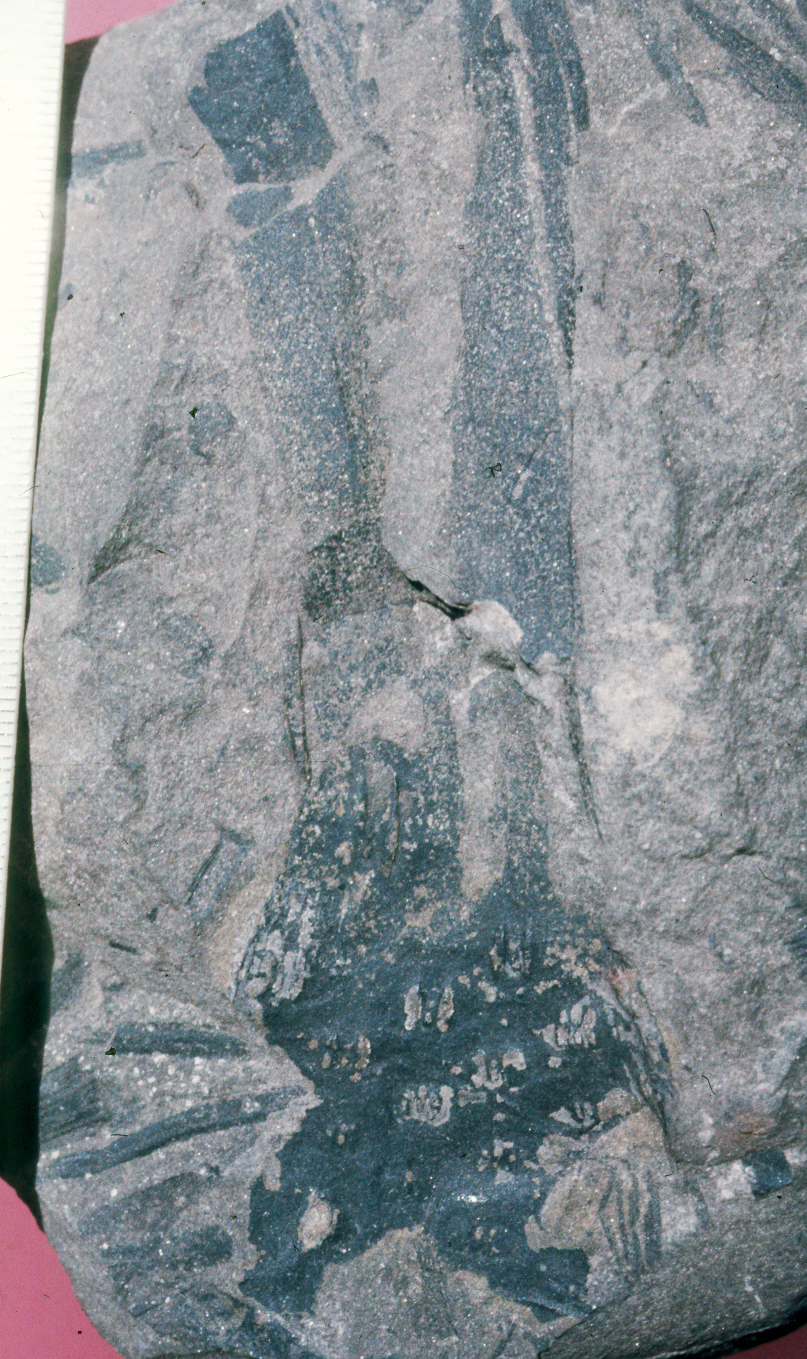
leafy apex of Pleuromeia dubia from the Early Triassic Newport Formation near Newport, NSW

== See also ==
- Evolution of plants
