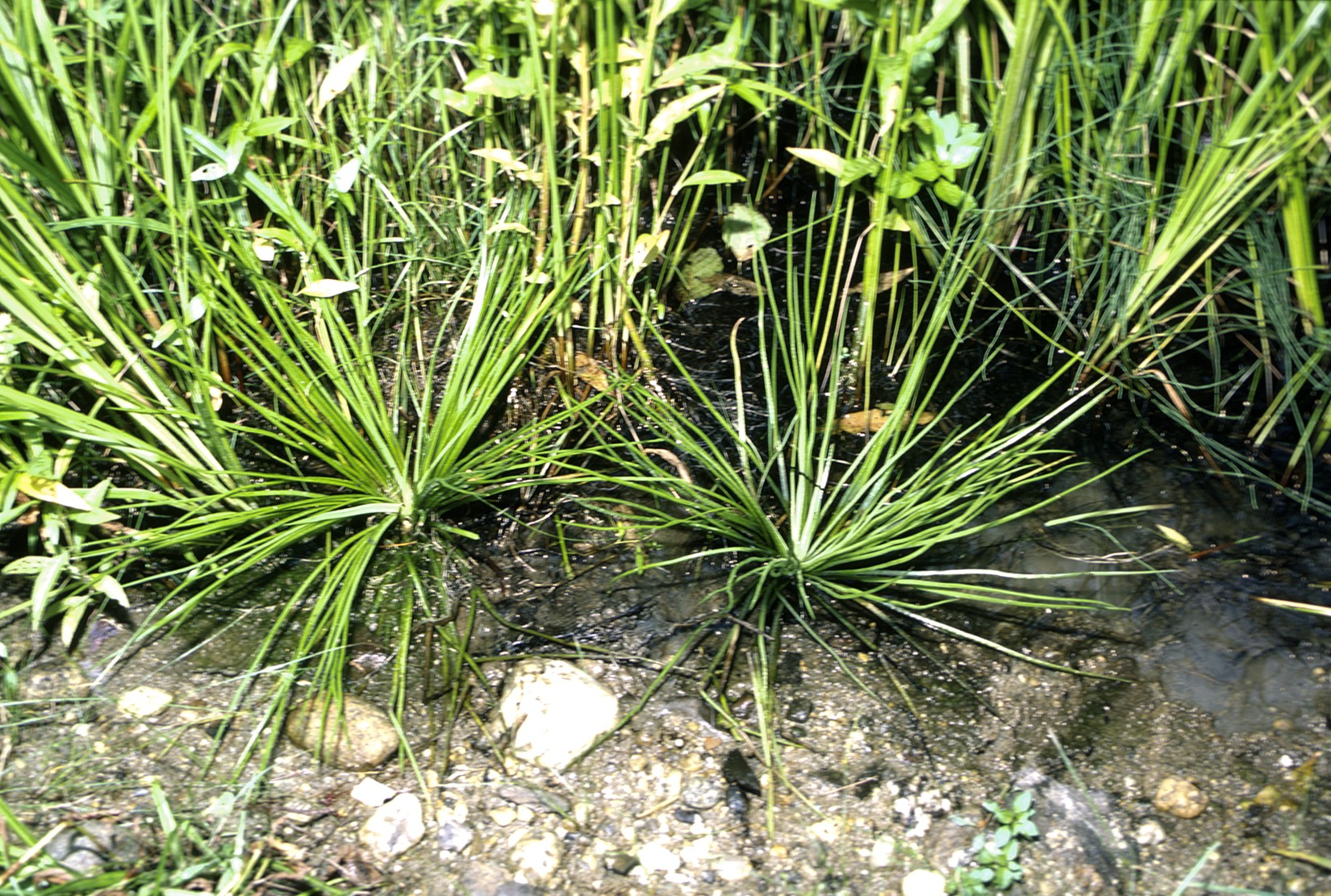

Conservation status
- Least Concern (IUCN 3.1)

Scientific classification
- Kingdom: Plantae
- Clade: Tracheophytes
- Clade: Lycophytes
- Class: Lycopodiopsida
- Order: Isoetales
- Family: Isoetaceae
- Genus: Isoetes
- Species: I. engelmannii

Binomial name
- Isoetes engelmannii A.Braun

Synonyms
- Calamaria engelmannii (A.Braun) Kuntze; Isoetes engelmannii var. fontana A.A.Eaton; Isoetes engelmannii var. gracilis Engelm.

= Isoetes engelmannii =

Eastern North American species of quillwort

Isoetes engelmannii is a species of aquatic plant in the family Isoetaceae. It is referred to by the common names Engelmann's quillwort or Appalachian quillwort (not to be confused with the newly described Isoetes appalachiana), and is the most widely distributed species of its genus in eastern North America. Its range extends from Ontario in the north, south to Florida and west Arkansas and Missouri. It can be found from April to October in temporary pools, bogs, marshes, stream edges, swamps and along wet roadsides.

== Description ==
Isoetes engelmannii is an emergent aquatic perennial pteridophyte. The rootstock (rhizomorph) is almost globose and normally has 2 lobes. The bright green, pliable leaves are evergreen and become paler towards the base and gradually taper to a point at the apex. They are typically about 60 cm in length, but they range from 10 cm up to 90 cm long. They are arranged spirally. The wall of the sporangium typically lacks any pigment, but sometimes it may be streaked with brown. The velum covers less than a quarter of the sporangium. The megaspores are white in colour and measure 400 to 560 μm in diameter. Their texture is reticulate (i.e. net-like) and the lamellate ridges are unbroken. The girdle that runs between these ridges is obscured by the heavy reticulation. The microspores are grey in colour, measure 20 to 30 μm in diameter, and are smooth to papillose (i.e. with minute projections) in texture. The spores mature in the summer. The chromosome number is 2n = 22.

== Distribution and habitat ==
Isoetes engelmannii is widely distributed in eastern North America, more so than any other species in the genus occurring in that region. Within Canada it is only found in the extreme southern portions of Ontario. In the United States its primary range begins in New Hampshire in the northeast and west to New York. There are also several outlying populations farther west in western Michigan. The range extends south along the Appalachians to the extreme north of Florida, and also continues west in the mountains to the northeastern tip of Mississippi, the northeastern tip of Arkansas and southeastern Missouri, and north to the southern portions of Indiana and Illinois. Another disjunct population exists in northeastern Ohio.

It can be found from April to October in habitats that include temporary pools, bogs, marshes, in streams or along their edges, swamps and along wet roadsides in ditches. It also grows as an emergent in shallow lakes and ponds.
