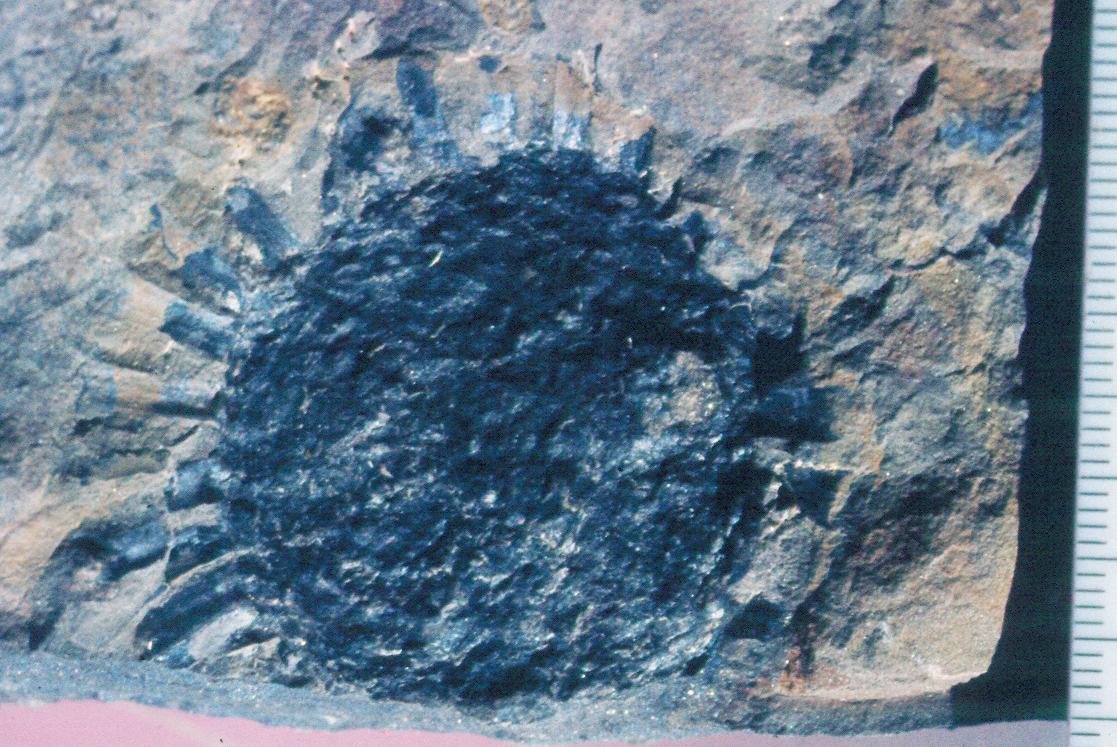
- Fertile plant of Tomiostrobus australis from Early Triassic Gosford Formation near Terrigal, NSW, Australia.

Scientific classification
- Kingdom: Plantae
- Clade: Tracheophytes
- Clade: Lycophytes
- Class: Lycopodiopsida
- Order: Isoetales
- Family: Isoetaceae
- Genus: †Tomiostrobus; Retallack

Species
- Tomiostrobus australis; Tomiostrobus polaris; Tomiostrobus radiatus; Tomiostrobus sinensis

= Tomiostrobus =

Tomiostrobus Temporal range: Early Triassic

Extinct genus of spore-bearing plants

Tomiostrobus is an extinct quillwort genus from the Early Triassic of Australia, China and Russia, which was especially widespread in the aftermath of Permian Triassic mass extinctions.

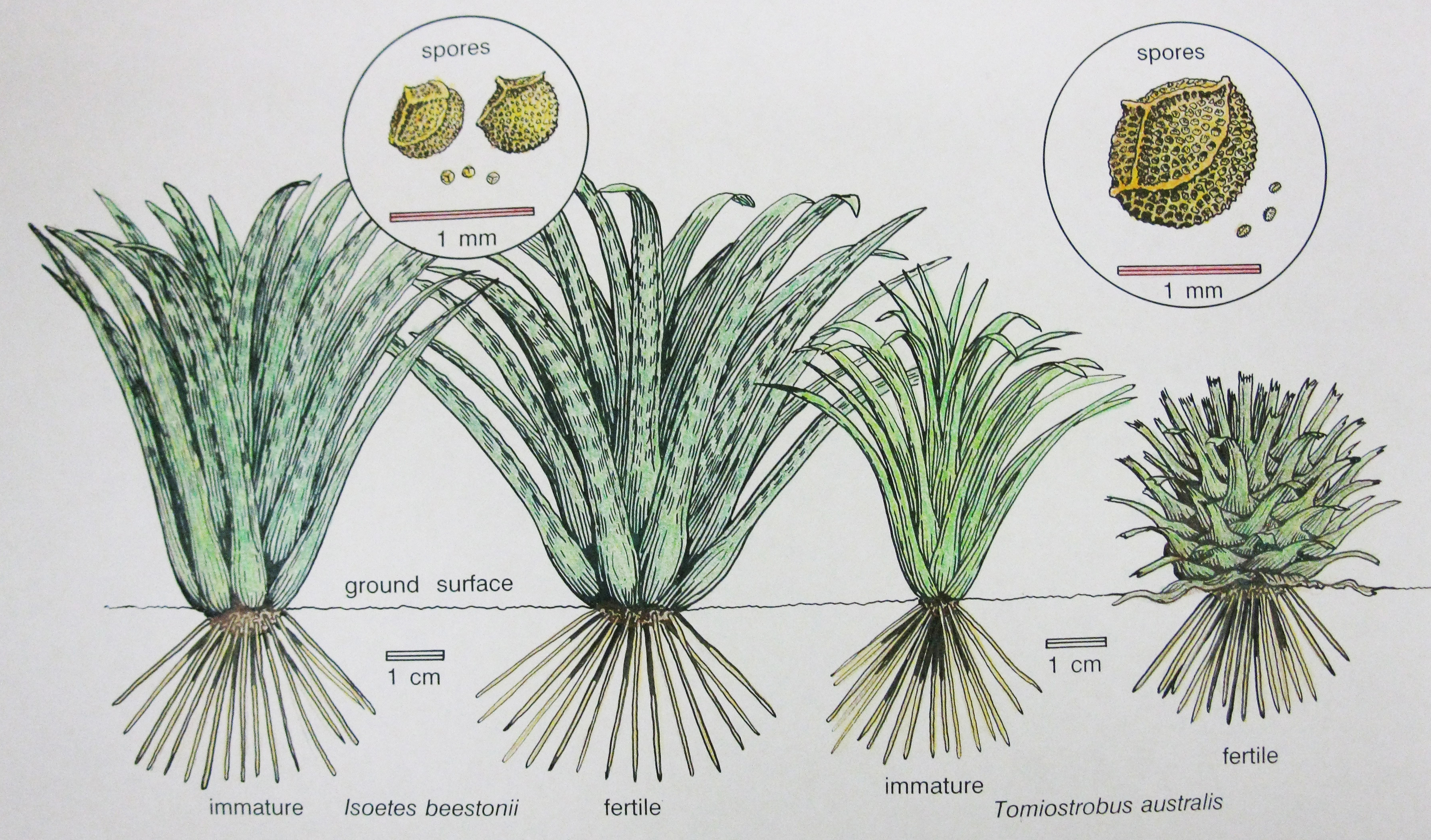
Reconstructions of sterile and fertile examples of Isoetes beestonii from the latest Permian Coal Cliff Sandstone of South Bulli Colliery, NSW, and of Tomiostrobus australis from the Early Triassic Gosford Formation near Terrigal, NSW

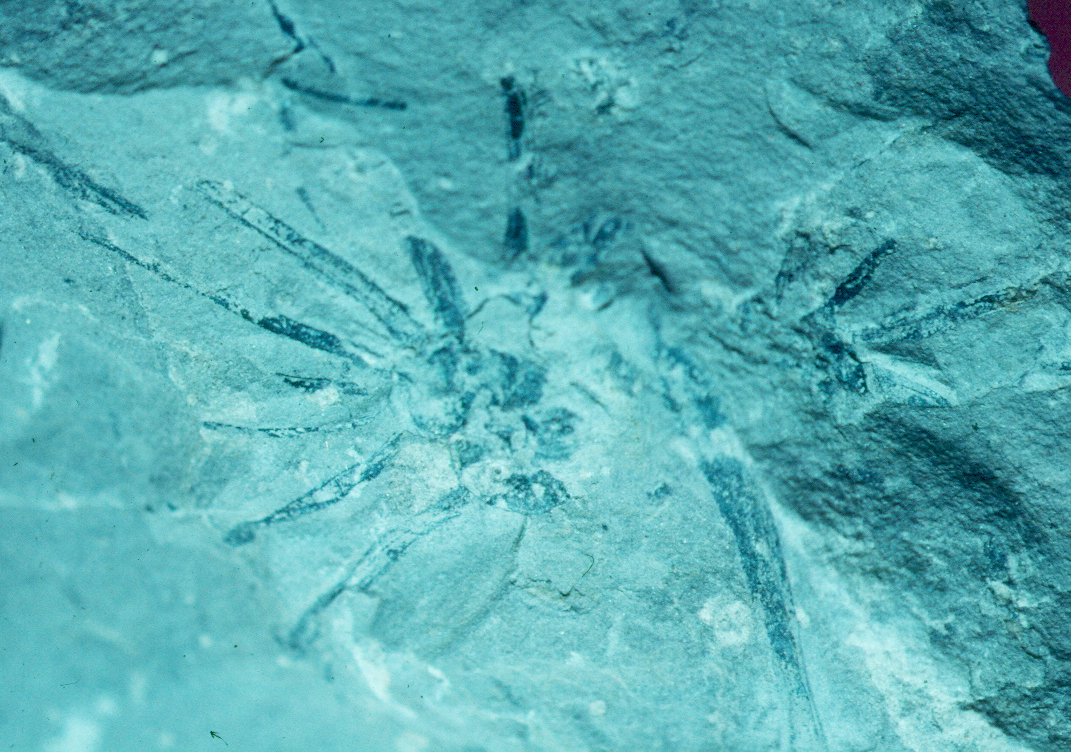
Juvenile plant of Tomiostrobus australis from the Early Triassic Newport Formation near Narrabeen, NSW

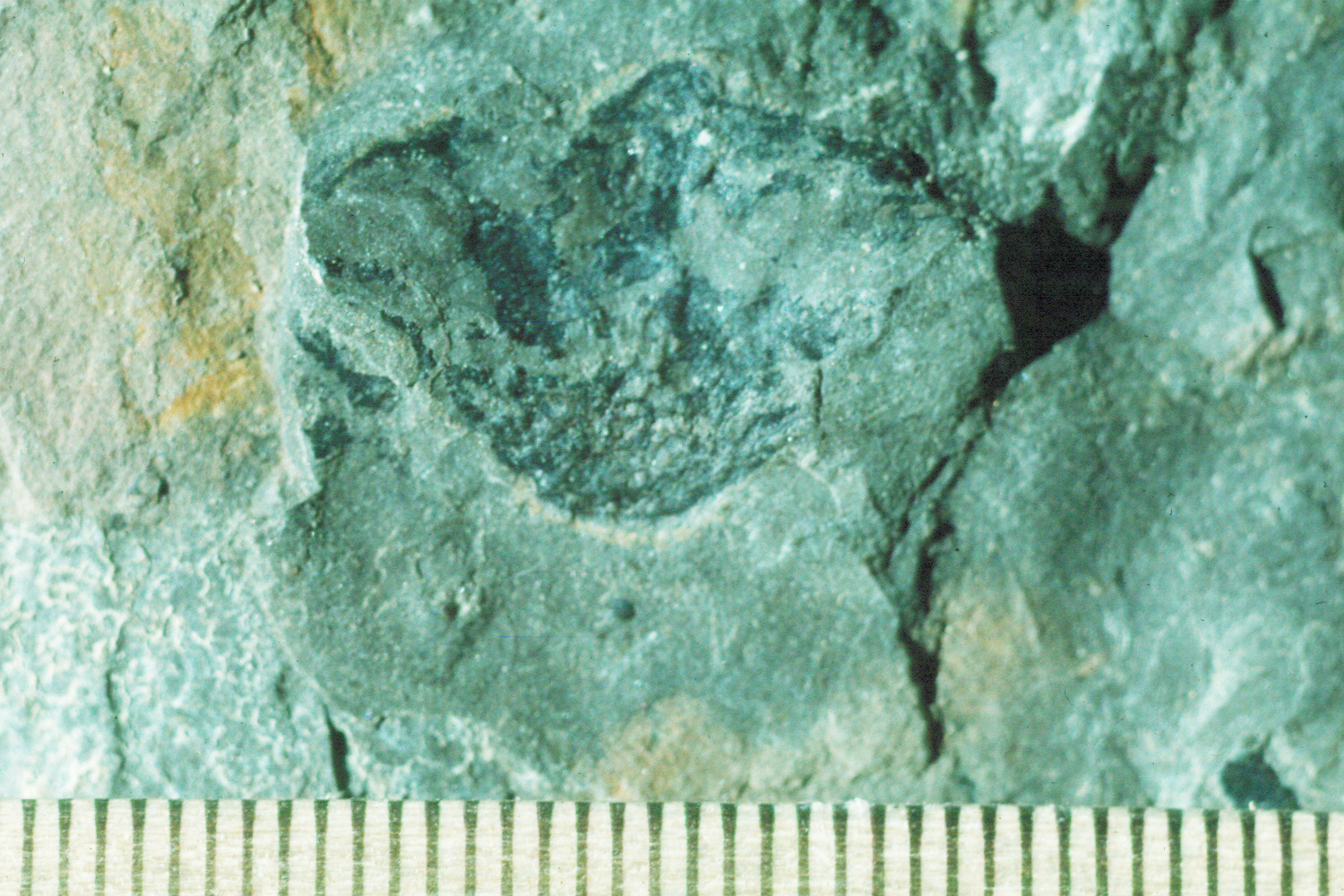
Corm with root scars at base of fertile Tomiostrobus australis from the Early Triassic Gosford Formation near Terrigal, NSW

== Description ==
Tomiostrobus australis is preserved as whole plants closely spaced within bedding planes, and lived as an early successional weed in lake and pond sedimentary environments, like living Isoetes. Unlike living Isoetes, Tomiostrobus formed closed cones with sporophylls that were distinctly shouldered and woody. This may have been an adaptation to heavy grazing by herbivorous therapsids.

== See also ==
- Evolution of plants
