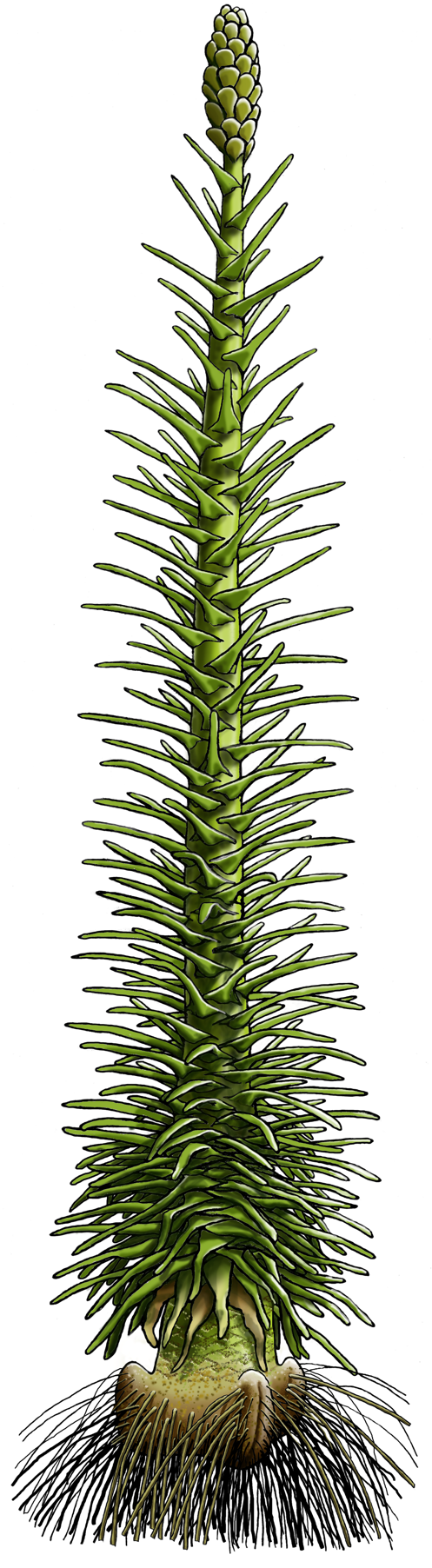
- Reconstruction of Pleuromeia sternbergii
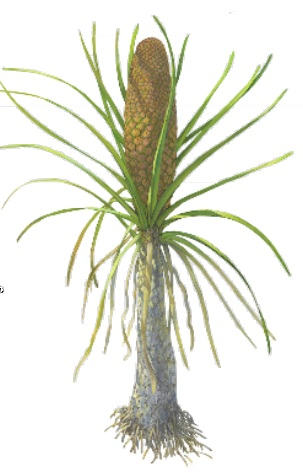
- Life restoration of Lycostrobus scottii

Scientific classification
- Kingdom: Plantae
- Clade: Tracheophytes
- Clade: Lycophytes
- Class: Lycopodiopsida
- Order: Isoetales
- Family: †Pleuromeiaceae

Genera
- †Cylomeia; †Cylostrobus; †Ferganodendron; †Lycostrobus; †Pleuromeia; †Mesenteriophyllum; †Pleurocaulus; †Takhtajanodoxa

= Pleuromeiaceae =

Pleuromeiaceae Temporal range: Early Triassic to earliest Jurassic Induan–Hettangian

Extinct family of spore-bearing plants

Pleuromeiaceae is an extinct family of lycophyte plants. They were especially widespread globally during the Early and Middle Triassic in the immediate aftermath of the Permian-Triassic mass extinction. Their closest living relatives are quillworts (Isoetes) in the order Isoetales, but they are more closely related to the extinct "arborescent lycophytes" like Lepidodendron, with which they share the upright vertical stems covered in rhomboidal leaf bases. They appear to be closely related and possibly descended from the Carboniferous Chaloneriaceae. While predominant in the Early and Middle Triassic in the unstable conditions in the aftermath of the Permian-Triassic extinction event, they drastically declined in the Late Triassic, with the youngest record being Lycostrobus scottii from the earliest Jurassic of Sweden, likely thriving in the immediate aftermath of the Triassic-Jurassic extinction event before disappearing shortly after.

Equicalastrobus was previously assigned to the family as part of the genus Lycostrobus, but has since been redescribed under the new genus as part of the family Equisetaceae.
