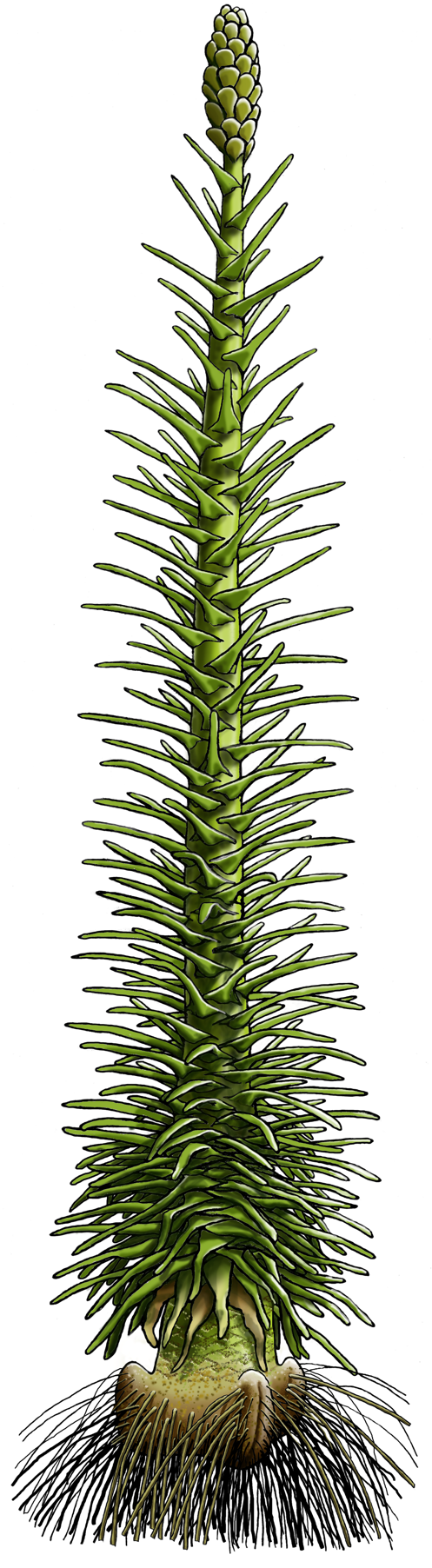
- Whole plant reconstruction of Pleuromeia sternbergi

Scientific classification
- Kingdom: Plantae
- Clade: Tracheophytes
- Clade: Lycophytes
- Class: Lycopodiopsida
- Order: Isoetales
- Family: †Pleuromeiaceae
- Genus: †Pleuromeia; Corda (1852)

Type species
- Sigillaria sternbergi Corda, 1839

Species
- See text

Synonyms
- Lycomeia

= Pleuromeia =

Pleuromeia Temporal range: Early-Middle Triassic, ~ Induan–Ladinian

Extinct genus of lycopsid plants in the Order Isoetales

Pleuromeia is an extinct genus of lycophytes related to modern quillworts (Isoetes). Pleuromeia dominated vegetation during the Early Triassic across Eurasia and elsewhere, in the aftermath of the Permian–Triassic extinction event. During this period, it often occurred in monospecific assemblages. Its sedimentary context in monospecific assemblages on immature paleosols is evidence that it was an opportunistic pioneer plant that grew on mineral soils with little competition. It spread to high latitudes under greenhouse climatic conditions.

== Description ==
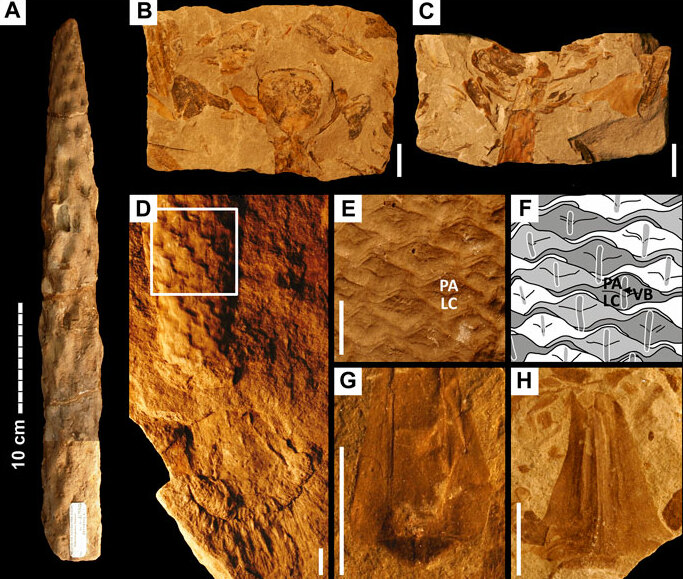
Fossils of Pleuromeia sternbergi (A) Cast of stem (B-C) compression fossil of strobilus with sporophylls, (D-F) compression fossil of stem showing rhomboidal leaf bases (G-H) leaf compression fossils

Pleuromeia consisted of a single unbranched stem of variable thickness, which could grow to a maximum of 2 metres (6.6 ft) high in P. sternbergi, (though they were typically smaller), with P. jiaochengensis only reaching about 30 centimetres (0.98 ft) in height. Around the stem were helically arranged triangular leaves, which became tapered towards their ends. These were attached to rhomboidal-shaped leaf bases/cushions on the stem, which when the leaves were abscised, left similarly rhomboid shaped leaf scars. It had a 2-4 lobed bulbous base to which numerous adventive roots were attached. Pleuromeia produced a single heterosporus large cone (strobilus) at the tip of the stem or in some species many smaller cones. The top of the cone carries microsporophylls, the lower part megasporophylls, and both types may be intercalated midlength. Sporophylls are disposed from the bottom up. Both types are obovate, with a round to ovoid sporangium and a tongue-like extension nearer to the tip on the upper/inner side. The trilete microspores are hollow, round and 30–40 μm in diameter. Megaspores have a layered outer skin with a small trilete mark, are also hollow, round to ovoid and up to 300–400 μm in diameter. The megaspores and microspores are assigned to Trileites and Densoisporites respectively.

== Ecology ==
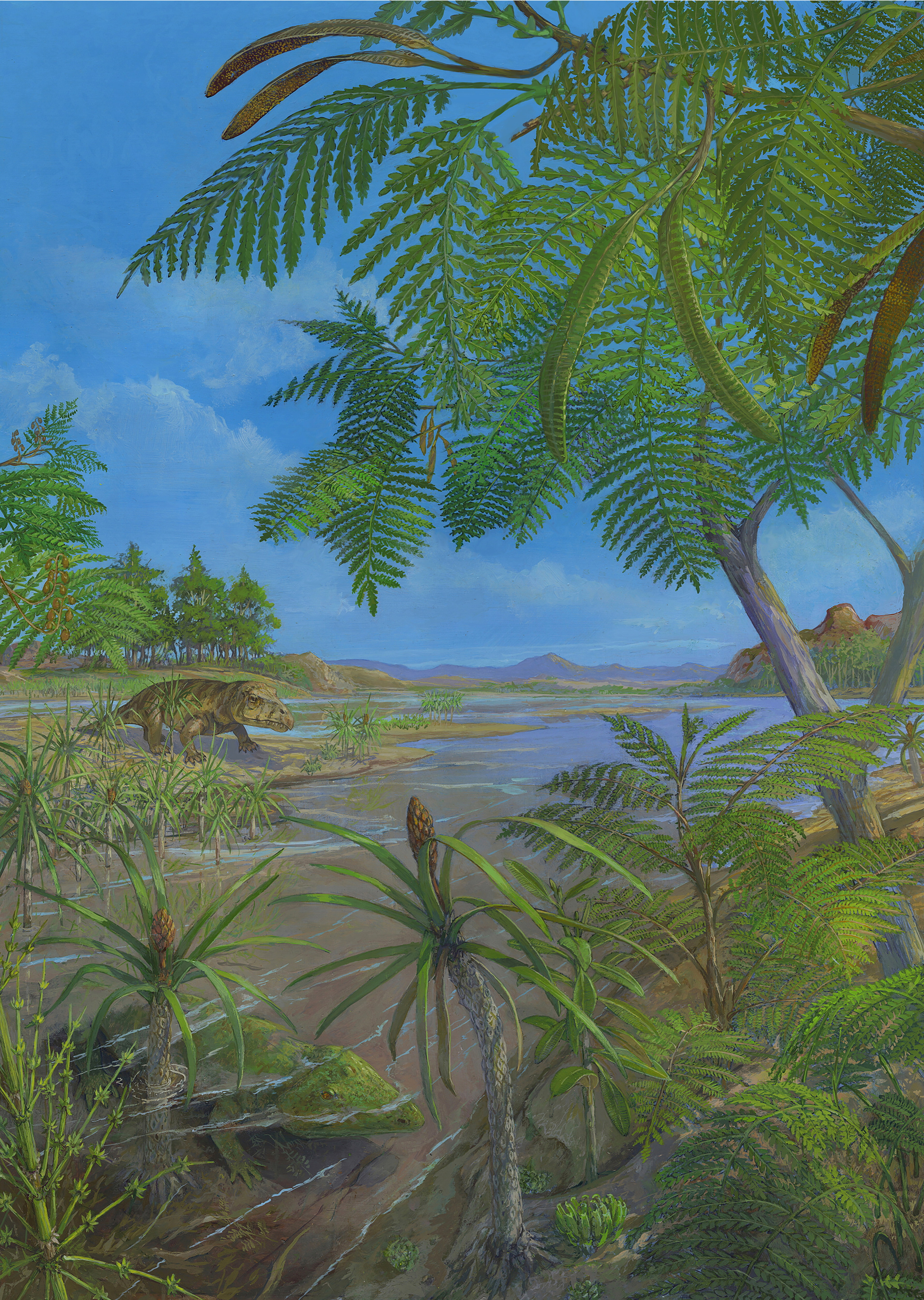
Pleuromeia (central foreground) in an Early Triassic Australian landscape, also including horsetails, Dicroidium trees (prominently on right), as well as the temnospondyl amphibian Bulgosuchus (foreground) and an erythrosuchid reptile (background left). Art by Michael Rothman

Dense populations of Pleuromeia, in the aftermath of Permian–Triassic extinction event, are recorded around the world from habitats ranging from semi-arid to tidal. Analysis suggest that they were perennial plants with relatively slow growth rates. However it is likely that they were also capable of rapid growth shortly prior to reproduction at the end of their lifespan. Their spores were likely able to survive long periods of dormancy, forming spore banks in the soil that were able to germinate long after the parent plants had died. Like modern quillworts, it has been suggested that Pleuromeia had Crassulacean acid metabolism (CAM)-type carbon fixation and/or used the Lycopsid Photosynthetic Pathway, as well intaking carbon dioxide from its roots. It is likely that while Pleuromeia was stress tolerant, it was poorly competitive against other plants under less stressed growing conditions, which may have been due to the much lower efficiency of the CAM-type carbon fixation compared to the typical C3 type used by other plants.

== Taxonomy ==
When the Cathedral of Magdeburg was under repair during the 1830s, a block of sandstone crashed and split open, revealing a fragment of the stem of Pleuromeia sternbergi. This was described by George Graf zu Munster in 1839 as a species of Sigillaria. Corda later assigned the species to the new genus Pleuromeya. The sandstone had been mined in a quarry near Bernburg (Saale) where later on numerous specimens of Pleuromeia were found, including cones. P. sternbergi has since been found in other Lower and Middle Buntsandstein deposits elsewhere in Germany, France and Spain. Other species have been described from several localities in Russia, Australia, South America and Japan.

Pleuromeia is placed in the family Pleuromeiaceae within the Isoetales, making their closest living relatives Isoetaceae, the family which contains modern Isoetes (quillworts), though Pleuromeiaceae appears to be more closely related to "arborescent lycophytes" like Lepidodendron than to quillworts, with which Pleuromeia and its relatives share key similarities, such as straight (largely) unbranched stems covered in simple leaves attached to rhomboidal leaf bases/cushions. Around 20 species of Pleuromeia have been described, predominantly from the Northern Hemisphere, though it is not clear that all of these species are valid.

Table of species after Deng et al. 2023.

Species	Age	Location
Pleuromeia altinis	Induan	North China
Pleuromeia epicharis	Olenekian	North China
Pleuromeia hataii	Olenekian	Japan
Pleuromeia jiaochengensis	Induan	North China
Pleuromeia jokunzhica	Olenekian - Anisian	Darvaz, Kazakhstan
Pleuromeia longicaulis (Cylostrobus sydneyensis)	Lower Triassic	Eastern Australia
Pleuromeia marginulata	Anisian	South China
Pleuromeia obovata	Ladinian	North China
Pleuromeia olenekensis	Olenekian	Siberia (Russia)
Pleuromeia pateriformis	Induan	North China
Pleuromeia reniformis	Olenekian	Eastern Australia
Pleuromeia rossica	Olenekian	Upper Volga, Russia
Pleuromeia sanxiaensis	Anisian	South China
Pleuromeia shaolinii	Anisian	Northeast China
Pleuromeia sternbergii	Olenekian to Ladinian?	Across Eurasia (from Western Europe to China) and possibly Argentina
Pleuromeia sp. 1	Olenekian	Taimyr, Russia
Pleuromeia sp. 2	Olenekian	Nevada, USA

The placement of the species Pleuromeia dubia from the Early Triassic of Australia in the genus has been questioned, due to its anatomy strongly differing from the typical species of the genus.

== Evolutionary history ==
The earliest members of the genus are known from the earliest Triassic (Induan) of North China, with the genus becoming abundant and globally distributed during the following Olenekian. During the Anisian, the genus declined following the development of a more warm humid climate and the subsequent diversification of other plant groups, with the youngest records of the genus being from the early Ladinian of North China, around 241.0-241.6 million years ago, with the genus likely being extinct by the beginning of the Late Triassic. The youngest known pleuromeiacean, the earliest Jurassic (Hettangian) Lycostrobus scottii, which thrived in the immediate aftermath of the Triassic-Jurassic mass extinction, has been suggested to be nested within/descended from Pleuromeia as traditionally defined.
