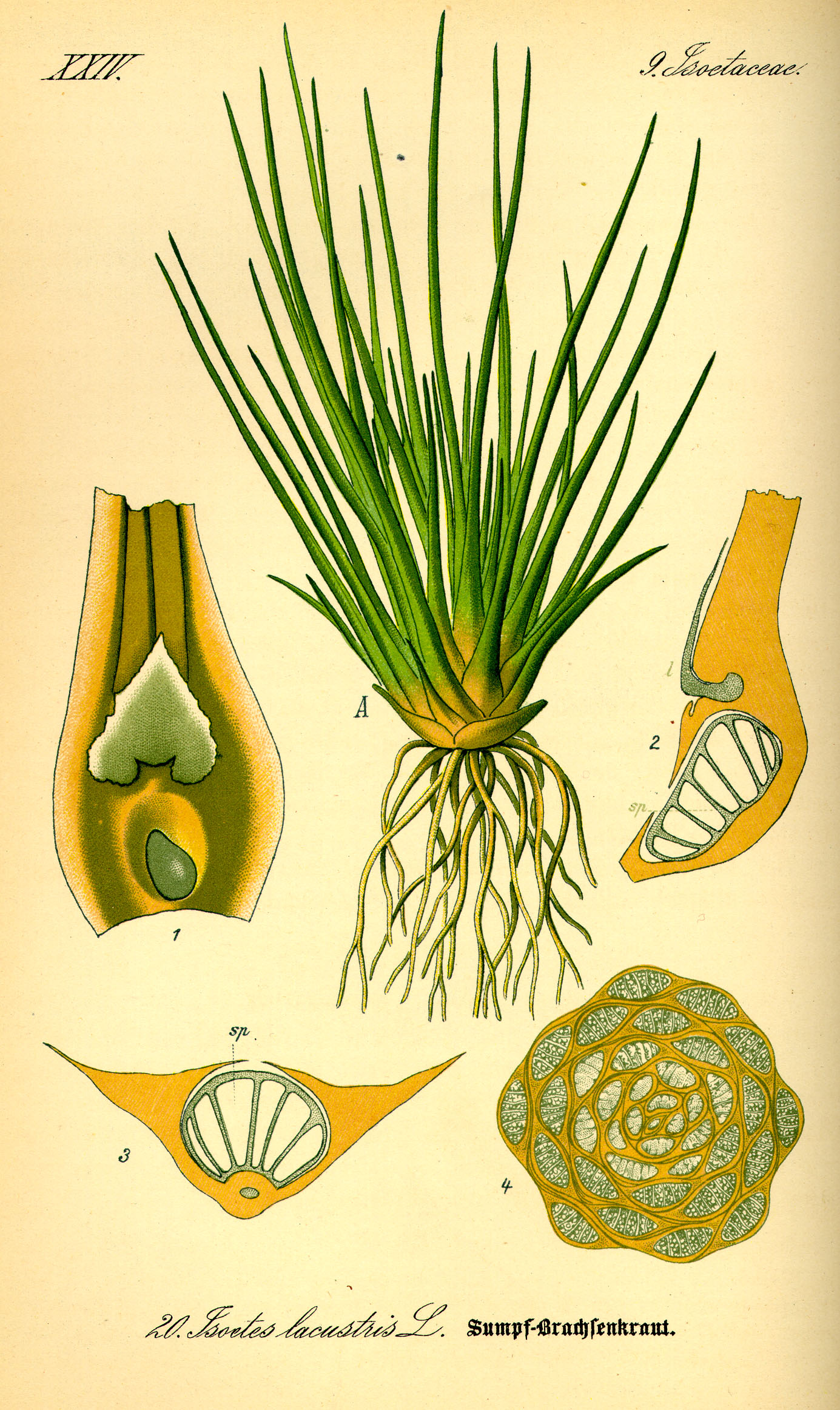
- Isoetes lacustris
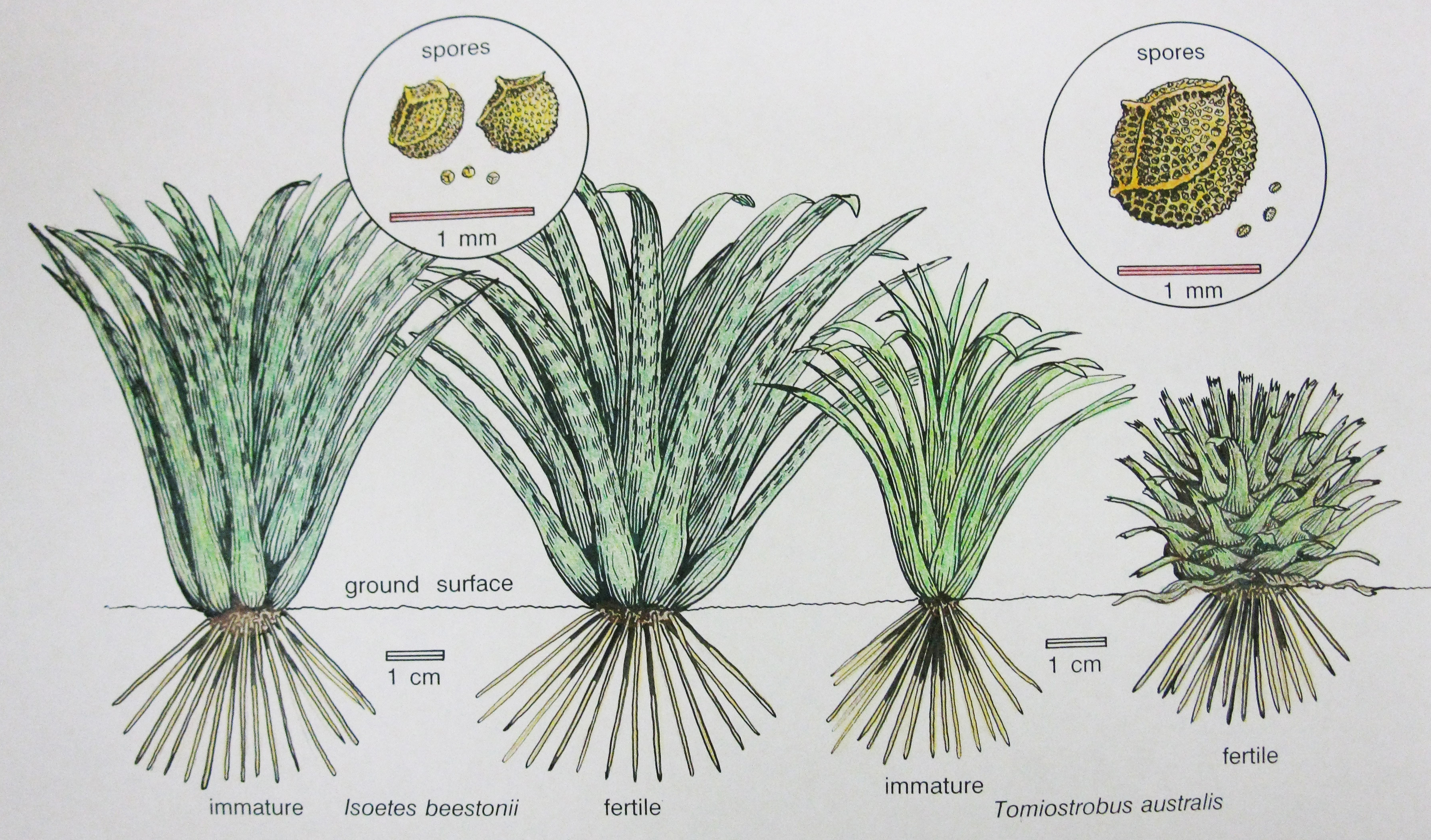
- Reconstructions of the Triassic isoetaceans "Isoetes" beestoni (left) and Tomiostrobus (right)

Scientific classification
- Kingdom: Plantae
- Clade: Embryophytes
- Clade: Tracheophytes
- Clade: Lycophytes
- Class: Lycopodiopsida
- Order: Isoetales
- Family: Isoetaceae; Rchb.

Genera
- Isoetes; †Lepacyclotes; †Isoetites; †Skilliostrobus; †Tomiostrobus

Synonyms
- Isoetaceae Dumort.; Bothriaceae Dulac

= Isoetaceae =

Isoetaceae Temporal range: Early Triassic–Recent

Family of spore-bearing plants

Isoetaceae is a family including living quillworts (Isoetes) and comparable extinct herbaceous lycopsids (Tomiostrobus). It was previously thought to have evolved by reduction in size from arborsecent Isoetales such as Pleuromeia, but the discovery of Isoetes beestonii from the Early Triassic shows that the growth habits of modern quillworts predate Pleuromeia and point to the family being a survivor of the Permian–Triassic extinctions.
